= Woman Seeking Dead Husband: Smokers Okay, No Pets =

- Psych episode
- Outside the hotel room of the paroled criminals. Pine trees are seen to take up most of the sky. A critic heavily criticized the scene and the setting for it, saying that it ruined the show's appearance of taking place in Santa Barbara, California.
- Episode no.: Season 1 Episode 4
- Directed by: Jeff Melman
- Written by: Steve Franks
- Production code: 1004
- Original air date: July 28, 2006
- Running time: 42 minutes

Guest appearances
- Kirsten Nelson as Chief Karen Vick; Sage Brocklebank as Officer Buzz McNab; Liam James as Young Shawn Spencer; Anne Marie DeLuise as Raylene Wilcroft; Steve Bacic as David Wilcroft; Patricia Idlette as police officer Allen

Episode chronology
← Previous "Speak Now or Forever Hold Your Piece"	Next → "9 Lives"
- Psych season 1

"Woman Seeking Dead Husband: Smokers Okay, No Pets" is the fourth episode of the first season of the American comedy-drama television series Psych. It was written by writer and co-executive producer Steve Franks, and was directed by Jeff Melman, his only work on the show. The episode originally aired on USA Network in the United States on July 28, 2006. The installment features guest appearances by series regulars Kirsten Nelson, Sage Brocklebank, Liam James, and Patricia Idlette among other guests.

The series follows Shawn Spencer (James Roday) and his colleague and best friend Gus (Dulé Hill), who claim to operate a psychic detective agency actually based on Shawn's hyperobservant ability. In the episode, the wife of a dead bank robber is brought to the police station to be warned that her husband's partners are being released from prison. She hires Shawn and Gus to help her find the money that was stolen and never found. Shawn and Gus search for the money, and find that the husband was not actually dead. Shawn realizes where the money is, and tells the woman, who he later discovers is actually the criminal mastermind. Detective Carlton Lassiter (Timothy Omundson) arrests the woman, and Shawn finds the money.

"Woman Seeking Dead Husband: Smokers Okay, No Pets" has received mixed-to-positive reception from television critics. The installment was considered to be, at its airtime, the best of the first season. According to the Nielsen Media Research, the episode was watched by 4.35 million people during its original broadcast, making up approximately 3.04 million households. It received a 2.8 rating/5 share among viewers in the 18–49 demographic on a National Broadcasting Company (NBC) re-airing.

== Plot ==
Detectives Carlton Lassiter (Timothy Omundson) and Juliet O'Hara (Maggie Lawson) bring Raylene Wilcroft (Anne Marie DeLuise) into the police station to warn her that her deceased husband's co-conspirators, who are bank robbers, are being released from prison and she might be in danger. She hires Shawn Spencer (James Roday) and Burton "Gus" Guster (Dulé Hill) to find the money her husband and the men stole and lost. While Shawn and Gus meet with Raylene and her family, Lassiter and Juliet follow the bank robbers, in the hope that they will lead the police to the money. After conducting a séance in the Psych office, Shawn and Gus visit the cemetery where the husband, David Wilcroft (Steve Bacic) is buried. Shawn and Gus find David alive and well at the cemetery, where he tells them that he faked his death after he accidentally lost the money. He, like his partners, has been searching for the money.

Shawn and Gus return and inform Raylene that David is still alive and living at the cemetery. Shawn talks to detective Lassiter and tells him of his plan to put the criminals back in prison due to parole violations; Lassiter denies Shawn's idea, wanting to find the money and put an end to the case. Determined, Shawn and Gus visit the robber's hotel room, in order to find evidence to put them back in prison. However, they are caught in the process. In an attempt to save themselves, Shawn tells the men that David wants them to know where the money is and that they should not harm Raylene; the robbers inform them that Raylene was actually the mastermind of the plan. Shawn and Gus rush back to the cemetery to find Raylene threatening to shoot David if she does not get the money. Shawn stalls long enough for the robbers, Juliet, and Lassiter to show up, and David and Raylene are arrested. Shawn then "psychically" locates the money.

== Production ==
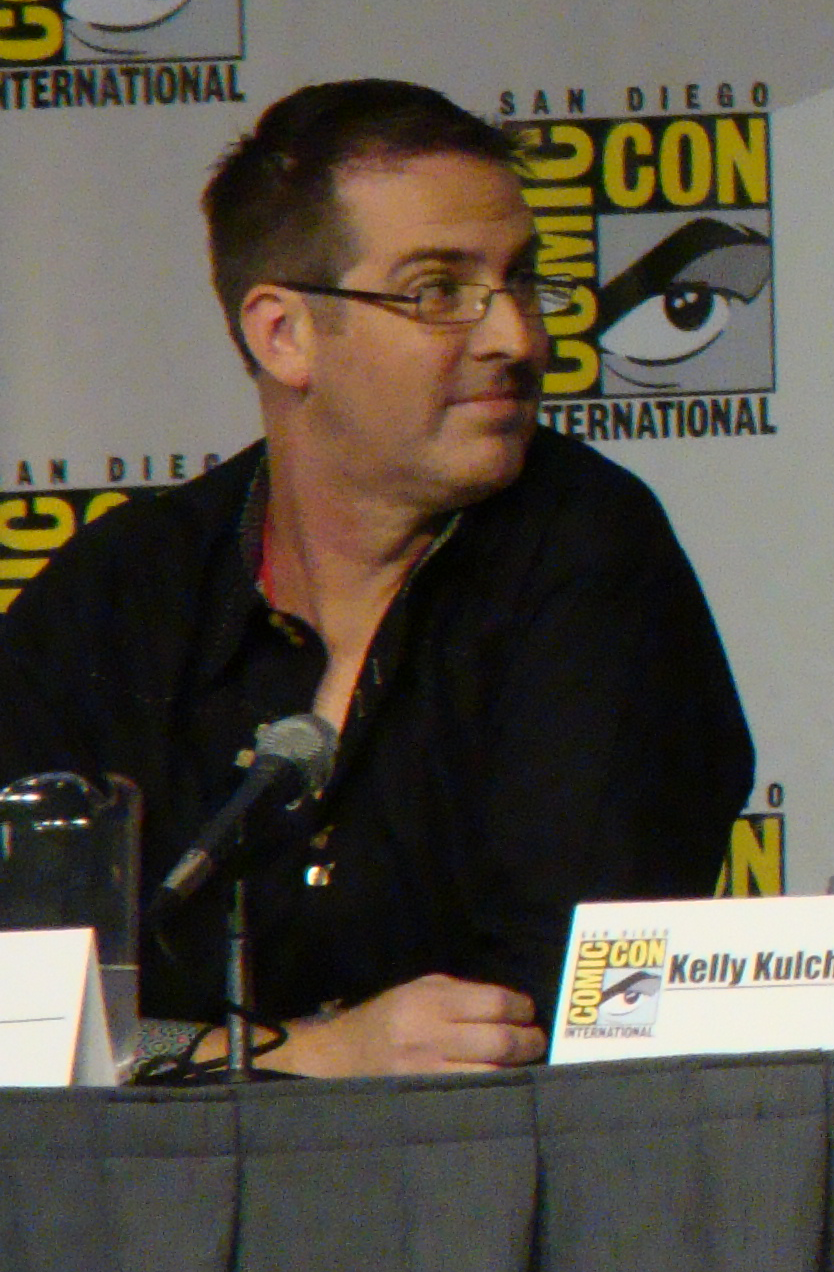
Steve Franks wrote the episode, his fourth straight work for the show.

"Woman Seeking Dead Husband: Smokers Okay, No Pets" was the only episode directed by Jeff Melman. The installment was the fourth of the series written by writer and co-executive producer Steve Franks; he had previously written the season's first three episodes "Pilot", "Spellingg Bee", and "Speak Now or Forever Hold Your Piece". Franks would not write another episode for the show until the tenth installment, "From the Earth to the Starbucks". Tracey Jeffery was the episode's producer; John J. Sakmar, Douglas Steinberg, and Kerry Lenhart were the consulting producers, and Mel Damski, Steve Franks, Kelly Kulchak, and Chris Henze were the executive producers. Erin Smith was the production manager. Tracy Hillman was the installment's associate producer, and Michael McMurray was the director of photography, while James Ilecic and Anupam Nigam acted as the editors. The music for the episode was written by Adam Cohen and John Robert Wood. Assistant directors for the installment were Jack Hardy and Roger Russell.

Although meant to take place in Santa Barbara, California, the installment, like the majority of Psych's episodes, was filmed in and around the Vancouver area of British Columbia. According to the show's creator Steve Franks, about half of the scenes in each episode are filmed in the suburb town of White Rock. Several of the sets, like the Psych office and Henry Spencer's house, are located along the coast in the White Rock area. Because of the differences between Vancouver and Santa Barbara, the show's producers were forced to bring in props for each episode, such as nine fake palm trees which had to be trucked to the set every day. The scripts for each Psych episode had to go through several reviews, and often were cut down by as much as a few dozen pages. A large portion of show's dialogue consists of on-the-spot improvisation by the actors, specifically Roday and Hill. The writers noted that much of the humor in the installments came from improvisation. The episode also included several reoccurring gags on the show, such as an introductory flashback and the inclusion of a pineapple; both gags were created by the action of one of the actors.

All fifteen episodes of Psych's first season were written with a stand-alone plot, meaning that no episode built off of a previous one. However, the installments were noted that even though they were stand-alone, episodes often built on each other for character development and would occasionally reference each other, creating a feel of continuity. Because of the writing style, the show's writing team would occasionally move around portions of episodes. The introduction to the second episode, "Spellingg Bee", was originally part of the script for "Woman Seeking Dead Husband", but was moved to the other episode due to a need to introduce the character Juliet O'Hara earlier in the season. The installment featured several guest stars. Kirsten Nelson, Sage Brocklebank, and Liam James all reprised their roles as the reoccurring characters police chief Karen Vick, officer Buzz McNab, and Young Shawn Spencer, respectively. Patricia Idlette made her final appearance as Desk Sergeant Martha Allen. Special guest appearances were made by Steve Bacic, who played David Wilcroft, the supposedly deceased former criminal, and Anne Marie DeLuise, who appeared as Raylene Wilcroft, the wife of Bacic's character. Maggie Lawson originally auditioned for the show using the scene which was moved to Spellingg Bee; the use of actual scenes from the episodes for auditioning was common for casting.

== Broadcast and release ==
The episode was originally broadcast in the United States on July 21, 2006, on USA Network as the seventh episode of the show's first season. It aired at a 10:00 p.m. EST/PST time slot, following a new episode of the show Monk. The episode aired under a rating of TV-PG, meaning that some of its content may not be appropriate for young children. The episode was rebroadcast by the National Broadcasting Company (NBC) on August 7, 2006, due to the network's struggling ratings. The installment was part of the first "mini-season"; the show took a mid-season break between August 2006 and January 2007. "Woman Seeking Dead Husband: Smokers Okay, No Pets" runs for approximately 43 minutes, the average length for a Psych episode.

"Woman Seeking Dead Husband: Smokers Okay, No Pets", along with the fourteen other episodes from Psych's first season were released on a four-disc DVD set in the United States and Canada on June 26, 2007. The set includes full audio commentaries for six episodes, deleted scenes for most episodes, blooper reals, audition tapes, character profiles, the international version of the episode "Pilot", an "Inside the writers' room" featurette, and other special features. The set is filmed in 1.78:1 aspect ratio, with English subtitles available, and Dolby Digital 5.1 Surround. The DVD set was released in the United Kingdom and other Region 2 countries on January 9, 2008, and was released in Australia on April 30 of the same year. The entire first season has also been released on the iTunes store for digital download, as well as independent downloads of each individual episode. Included on the DVD set was a deleted scene for "Woman Seeking Dead Husband: Smokers Okay, No Pets". The feature consisted of the single cut scene, approximately 45 seconds of video. The deleted scene contained Juliet and Lassiter talking with each other about being shown-up by Shawn's ability to solve cases, while they were following the paroled criminals.

== Reception ==
According to the Nielsen Media Research, "Woman Seeking Dead Husband: Smokers Okay, No Pets" was viewed by a total of 4.35 million people in its original USA Network broadcast. This totaled to approximately 3.04 million households which viewed the episode. The NBC rebroadcasting of the episode received a 2.8 rating/5 share in the 18–49 demographic, meaning that on average 2.8 percent of all television-equipped households were tuned in to the installment at any given moment, while 5 percent of households watching TV were tuned into it during the time slot. This was a drop in viewership compared to the previous episode, "Speak Now or Forever Hold Your Piece", which brought in 4.69 million viewers and a 1.6 rating/5 share. The viewership was also significantly lower than the following episode, "9 Lives", which was seen by 4.72 million people and also brought in a 1.6 rating/5 share.

Since airing, the installment has received mixed to generally positive reviews. In his review for IGN, contributor Colin Moriarty presented mixed feelings toward the episode, saying that, for the show, "perhaps there's light at the end of the tunnel after all". He considered the episode to have "dropped in posthaste behind Monk", but that it "didn't have its usual negative connotation this week... at least, not in full force". Moriarty stated that the "show seemed to take an interesting and much-desired turn for the better". He considered the show to be moving away from being predictable, but that its "stride is below average". Moriarty considered the episode to be more intriguing, and that the characters were developed quite well, especially that of Gus. He continued to question whether the show would be able to last more than one season, but considered the show to be becoming better developed. Moriarty praised two scenes in the episode, Shawn and Gus' conversation on the way to the graveyard and Shawn snooping in the police file room, as being the funniest of the episode. The installment was given a rating of 7, or "good", making it an improvement over the previous two episodes, "Spellingg Bee" and "Speak Now or Forever Hold Your Piece", as well as tying it for the highest rated episode of the season at the time.

In his review for TV Squad, critic Richard Keller generally praised the installment, calling it "the funniest episode of the series so far". Keller compared James Roday to Ben Stiller, and praised the development of Gus' character. He also praised the development of detectives Lassiter and O'Hara. He cited the scene in which Shawn and Gus are trapped by the criminals as an example of why the episode was the funniest to him. However, Keller also had a few complaints with the installment. He criticized the episode's beginning, where "a seemingly large evergreen forest looming" can be seen, saying that it ruined the illusion of the show taking place in Santa Barbara. He stated that "the whole thing seemed a little bit incomplete" due to the lack of a complete "psychic reveal" at the end of the episode, and that the reduced use of Corbin Bernsen in the installment was an issue.
