= Psych season 2 =

Psych
- Season 2
- The DVD cover of the second season of Psych.
- Starring: James Roday; Dulé Hill; Timothy Omundson; Maggie Lawson; Kirsten Nelson; Corbin Bernsen
- No. of episodes: 16

Release
- Original network: USA Network
- Original release: July 13, 2007 – February 15, 2008

Season chronology
- ← Previous; Season 1 Next → Season 3

The second season of Psych originally aired in the United States on USA Network from July 13, 2007 to February 15, 2008. It consisted of 16 episodes. James Roday, Dulé Hill, Timothy Omundson, Maggie Lawson, and Corbin Bernsen reprised their roles as the main characters, and Kirsten Nelson joined the main cast. James Roday portrayed Shawn Spencer, a fake psychic detective who periodically consults for the Santa Barbara police department. A DVD of the season was released on July 8, 2008.

== Production ==
Show creator Steve Franks remained in his position of showrunner. "I Know, You Know," performed by The Friendly Indians, continued to be used as the theme song, though it was modified for two episodes: "Gus's Dad May Have Killed an Old Guy," in which it was performed with a Christmas theme, and "Lights, Camera... Homicidio," in which the lyrics were sung in Spanish.

Mel Damski directed three episodes for the season, while John Badham, Jason Ensler, Joanna Kerns, John Landis, Eric Laneuville, Paul Lazarus, Tim Matheson, Arlene Sanford, Oz Scott, Matt Shakman, Stephen Surjik, and Michael Zinberg directed one episode each. Steve Franks directed his first episode for the series, directing the season finale.

Franks also wrote four episodes, while Andy Berman wrote three. Josh Bycel, Anupam Nigam, Saladin K. Patterson, and James Roday wrote two episodes each. Daniel Hsia, Tim Meltreger, and Tami Sagher each wrote one episode.

== Cast ==
Every cast member from the end of the first season returned, with one addition. James Roday continued to play fake psychic detective Shawn Spencer. Burton "Gus" Guster returned, portrayed by Dulé Hill. Timothy Omundson returned as Head Detective Carlton "Lassie" Lassiter, while Maggie Lawson continued to portray Juliet "Jules" O'Hara. Corbin Bernsen was kept on as Henry Spencer. This was the first season in which Kirsten Nelson received a star billing for her role as SBPD Interim Chief Karen Vick.

Sage Brocklebank continued to portray Officer Buzz McNab, in 11 of the 16 episodes. Liam James was the sole actor portraying young Shawn Spencer, and Carlos McCullers II took over the role of young Gus. Phylicia Rashad made her first appearance as Winnie Guster, and Ernie Hudson made an appearance as William "Bill" Guster.

Other guest stars in the second season included John Amos, Curtis Armstrong, Obba Babatundé, Malcolm Barrett, W. Earl Brown, Matt Cedeno, Tim Curry, Cristián de la Fuente, Amanda Detmer, Gina Gershon, Ben Giroux, Philip Baker Hall, Howard Hesseman, Telma Hopkins, Katharine Isabelle, Christopher Jacot, Bianca Kajlich, Eric Keenleyside, Melanie Lynskey, Shane Meier, Alex Meneses, Brian Doyle-Murray, Dylan Neal, Amanda Pays, Lou Diamond Phillips, Saul Rubinek, Corey Sevier, Kevin Sorbo, Kerry Washington, and Calum Worthy.

== Episodes ==
List of Psych season 2 episodes
No. overall	No. in season	Title	Directed by	Written by	Original release date	U.S. viewers (millions)
16	1	"American Duos"	John Landis	Steve Franks & James Roday	July 13, 2007	4.33
Shawn and Gus protect a Simon Cowell-esque judge (Tim Curry) from an American Idol style reality show after multiple failed assassination attempts, but it's soon obvious that his massive ego and sarcastic remarks will make it difficult to narrow down the suspect list – which even extends to his closest co-workers (Gina Gershon and Cristián de la Fuente).
17	2	"65 Million Years Off"	Tim Matheson	Steve Franks	July 20, 2007	3.90
The police think Shawn is overreaching when he suspects that a dinosaur killed a man, but when it's revealed that the victim was a paleontologist, suddenly his theory seems feasible. Shawn and Gus find out the paleontologist had been illegally digging for prehistorical remains at a place whose owner wants something to stay hidden.
18	3	"Psy vs. Psy"	Mel Damski	Andy Berman	July 27, 2007	4.81
Shawn may have met his match when an FTD (Federal Treasury Department) agent (Lou Diamond Phillips) brings in a female "psychic" (Bianca Kajlich) to solve a counterfeiting case, but after an attraction develops between the two, Shawn manages to solve the case and prove himself as the "true" psychic.
19	4	"Zero to Murder in Sixty Seconds"	Stephen Surjik	Saladin K. Patterson	August 3, 2007	3.73
When Lassiter's car is stolen, Shawn manages to track it down to a chop shop with little trouble. However, Shawn is certain that there is more going on and decides to find out what the true crime is.
20	5	"And Down the Stretch Comes Murder"	Michael Zinberg	Josh Bycel	August 10, 2007	4.43
A childhood nemesis of Gus and Shawn, who now works as a jockey, turns to them for help in determining why his horses never win. But, the investigation soon turns into a murder case when another jockey dies during a race.
21	6	"Meat Is Murder, But Murder Is Also Murder"	Eric Laneuville	Daniel Hsia	August 17, 2007	3.81
When Gus' Uncle Burton (John Amos) visits, Shawn and Gus are forced to pretend that Gus is a psychic due to a misunderstanding, all while investigating a food critic's murder.
22	7	"If You're So Smart, Then Why Are You Dead?"	Arlene Sanford	Anupam Nigam	August 24, 2007	4.25
Two students (Jeffrey Tedmori and Calum Worthy) at a school for the gifted suspect a teacher of murder, leading Shawn and Gus to go undercover as lecturers on "Phsysics: The Physics of Psychics" in order to discover the truth. Coincidentally, both O'Hara - acting as the primary detective for the first time - and Lassiter are looking into the case as well. For Gus, the case is somewhat personal, as he intends to find out why he didn't get into the school.
23	8	"Rob-a-Bye Baby"	Paul Lazarus	Tami Sagher	September 7, 2007	3.73
Chief Vick assigns Shawn and Gus to use Shawn's psychic powers to screen a new nanny for her before she loses her mind to sleep deprivation. Though Shawn has his eyes on a string of high-profile robberies -- especially after stumbling on a crime scene where the robbery turned to murder after being picked up for harassing nannies and children in the park -- the chief demands that they focus only on the nanny-search. The two are even fired for dividing their attention -- until Shawn determines that there's a connection between the robberies and the nanny agency.
24	9	"Bounty Hunters!"	John Badham	Andy Berman	September 14, 2007	4.15
When an accused murderer/burglar (W. Earl Brown) escapes custody on Juliet's watch, Shawn and Gus enter the case to track him down, only to realize that he is not guilty of murder. Meanwhile, a childhood-idol bounty hunter (Kevin Sorbo) from Shawn's and Gus' youth complicates matters further.
25	10	"Gus' Dad May Have Killed an Old Guy"	Oz Scott	Saladin K. Patterson	December 7, 2007	3.67
After Gus' parents (Phylicia Rashad and Ernie Hudson) are arrested for murdering an old man around Christmas time, Shawn sets out to prove their innocence and at the same time, show them that he is not a bad influence on Gus. Psych's first annual Christmas special.
26	11	"There's Something About Mira"	Joanna Kerns	Josh Bycel & Daniel Hsia	January 11, 2008	4.69
Shawn is shocked to learn that Gus has a wife named Mira (Kerry Washington), whom he had drunkenly married in 1997 during Spring Break in Mazatlan. His shock turns to intrigue when Mira's fiancé (Dylan Neal), a private investigator, a stolen refrigerator truck, and a winery come into the picture. In the meantime, O'Hara and Lassiter compete against each other when they learn their scores from their detectives exams.
27	12	"The Old and the Restless"	Jason Ensler	Anupam Nigam	January 18, 2008	3.86
Henry goes undercover at a local retirement community to help Shawn and Gus investigate a resident's disappearance. Even after they find the missing man, others from the same home begin to suffer health problems, and Shawn realizes how a break-in at the community's pharmacy links them all together.
28	13	"Lights, Camera... Homicidio"	Matt Shakman	Andy Berman	January 25, 2008	4.66
A murder is accidentally committed on the set of a Spanish soap opera telenovela when someone replaced a collapsible prop knife with a real one. As usual, Lassiter considers the case closed. After the star (Matt Cedeno) and head writer (Saul Rubinek) are arrested, Shawn sets out to find the real murderer, and, in the meantime, gains a role on the show.
29	14	"Dis-Lodged"	Mel Damski	Tim Meltreger	February 1, 2008	4.07
A high-ranking member of the Monarch Lodge - a secret society in Santa Barbara - is found dead. Henry was once a member himself, and Shawn, having followed him there, believes it was murder. Lassiter discreetly asks Shawn to go undercover. Lassiter's soon to be ex-father-in-law (Philip Baker Hall), who is the highest ranking member, is the main suspect. For Gus, the case is an opportunity to rack up some prestigious clients.
30	15	"Black and Tan: A Crime of Fashion"	Mel Damski	Steve Franks & James Roday	February 8, 2008	3.51
A fashion designer is electrocuted at his exclusive party. Shawn and Gus go undercover, having gotten into the party by pretending to be models. However, Gus is more concerned with dating one of the models and leaves Shawn all but completely forgotten. Meanwhile, Chief Karen Vick surprises Henry by bringing her female friend (Amanda Pays) into his house and then leaving them alone. Henry is reluctant to date her, but she proves to get just what she wants. Shawn is left frustrated between solving the case without Gus' help and putting up with Henry's need for dating advice.
31	16	"Shawn (and Gus) of the Dead"	Steve Franks	Steve Franks	February 15, 2008	4.70
As Karen Vick makes a surprising announcement about her future, a 3,000-year-old mummy disappears from a museum. Shawn reasons that the mummy walked out, leading him and a terrified Gus to believe that an actual mummy is on the loose, even more so after the night watchman is found strangled to death. In the meantime, Henry receives a phone call which prompts Shawn to meet him "without Gus." As the second season comes to a close, Shawn's entire world turns on its head when a surprise guest shows up at Henry's door.
