= List of Psych episodes =

Psych is an American crime/mystery dramedy television series that premiered on July 7, 2006, on USA Network, and aired its series finale on March 26, 2014. It stars James Roday as Shawn Spencer, who uses his eidetic memory with the observational and investigative skills that his father ingrained in him during childhood to fake being a psychic who consults with the Santa Barbara Police Department to solve cases, as well as running a psychic detective agency called Psych. He is (reluctantly) helped in his charade by his best friend, Burton "Gus" Guster (Dulé Hill), and his father, Henry Spencer (Corbin Bernsen). He generally works with police detectives Carlton Lassiter (Timothy Omundson) and Juliet O'Hara (Maggie Lawson) and under the direction of Police Chief Karen Vick (Kirsten Nelson). Episodes usually begin with a flashback to Shawn's youth, showcasing one of Henry's lessons for his son. These lessons are typically used or applied later in the episode. During the run of Psych, 121 episodes aired.

A film sequel to Psych, titled Psych: The Movie, aired on December 7, 2017, launching the Psych film series. A second film, Psych 2: Lassie Come Home, premiered on Peacock on July 15, 2020, while a third film, Psych 3: This Is Gus, premiered on Peacock on November 18, 2021.

== Series overview ==
Season	Episodes	Originally released		
Season	Episodes	First released	Last released	Network
1	15	July 7, 2006	March 2, 2007	USA
2	16	July 13, 2007	February 15, 2008	USA
3	16	July 18, 2008	February 20, 2009	USA
4	16	August 7, 2009	March 10, 2010	USA
5	16	July 14, 2010	December 22, 2010	USA
6	16	October 12, 2011	April 11, 2012	USA
7	14	February 27, 2013	May 29, 2013	USA
Psych: The Musical		December 15, 2013		USA
8	10	January 8, 2014	March 26, 2014	USA
Psych: The Movie		December 7, 2017		USA
Psych 2: Lassie Come Home		July 15, 2020		Peacock
Psych 3: This Is Gus		November 18, 2021		Peacock

== Episodes ==
=== Season 1 (2006–07) ===
List of Psych season 1 episodes
No. overall	No. in season	Title	Directed by	Written by	Original release date	U.S. viewers (millions)
1	1	"Pilot"	Michael Engler	Steve Franks	July 7, 2006	6.06
2	2	"Spellingg Bee"	Mel Damski	Steve Franks	July 14, 2006	4.71
3	3	"Speak Now or Forever Hold Your Piece"	Michael Zinberg	Steve Franks	July 21, 2006	4.69
4	4	"Woman Seeking Dead Husband: Smokers Okay, No Pets"	Jeff Melman	Steve Franks	July 28, 2006	4.35
5	5	"9 Lives"	Matt Shakman	Andy Berman	August 4, 2006	4.72
6	6	"Weekend Warriors"	John Fortenberry	Douglas Steinberg	August 11, 2006	4.76
7	7	"Who Ya Gonna Call?"	Michael Lange	Kerry Lenhart & John J. Sakmar	August 18, 2006	4.89
8	8	"Shawn vs. the Red Phantom"	John T. Kretchmer	Anupam Nigam	August 25, 2006	4.64
9	9	"Forget Me Not"	Mel Damski	Lee Goldberg & William Rabkin	January 19, 2007	3.78
10	10	"From the Earth to the Starbucks"	Michael Zinberg	Steve Franks	January 26, 2007	3.70
11	11	"He Loves Me, He Loves Me Not, He Loves Me, Oops He's Dead!"	Tim Matheson	Andy Berman	February 2, 2007	3.81
12	12	"Cloudy... With a Chance of Murder"	Lev L. Spiro	Andy Berman	February 9, 2007	3.60
13	13	"Game, Set... Muuurder?"	James L. Conway	Anupam Nigam	February 16, 2007	3.20
14	14	"Poker? I Barely Know Her"	Joanna Kerns	Kerry Lenhart, John J. Sakmar & Douglas Steinberg	February 23, 2007	3.74
15	15	"Scary Sherry: Bianca's Toast"	John Landis	Steve Franks & James Roday	March 2, 2007	4.48

=== Season 2 (2007–08) ===
List of Psych season 2 episodes
No. overall	No. in season	Title	Directed by	Written by	Original release date	U.S. viewers (millions)
16	1	"American Duos"	John Landis	Steve Franks & James Roday	July 13, 2007	4.33
17	2	"65 Million Years Off"	Tim Matheson	Steve Franks	July 20, 2007	3.90
18	3	"Psy vs. Psy"	Mel Damski	Andy Berman	July 27, 2007	4.81
19	4	"Zero to Murder in Sixty Seconds"	Stephen Surjik	Saladin K. Patterson	August 3, 2007	3.73
20	5	"And Down the Stretch Comes Murder"	Michael Zinberg	Josh Bycel	August 10, 2007	4.43
21	6	"Meat Is Murder, But Murder Is Also Murder"	Eric Laneuville	Daniel Hsia	August 17, 2007	3.81
22	7	"If You're So Smart, Then Why Are You Dead?"	Arlene Sanford	Anupam Nigam	August 24, 2007	4.25
23	8	"Rob-a-Bye Baby"	Paul Lazarus	Tami Sagher	September 7, 2007	3.73
24	9	"Bounty Hunters!"	John Badham	Andy Berman	September 14, 2007	4.15
25	10	"Gus' Dad May Have Killed an Old Guy"	Oz Scott	Saladin K. Patterson	December 7, 2007	3.67
26	11	"There's Something About Mira"	Joanna Kerns	Josh Bycel & Daniel Hsia	January 11, 2008	4.69
27	12	"The Old and the Restless"	Jason Ensler	Anupam Nigam	January 18, 2008	3.86
28	13	"Lights, Camera... Homicidio"	Matt Shakman	Andy Berman	January 25, 2008	4.66
29	14	"Dis-Lodged"	Mel Damski	Tim Meltreger	February 1, 2008	4.07
30	15	"Black and Tan: A Crime of Fashion"	Mel Damski	Steve Franks & James Roday	February 8, 2008	3.51
31	16	"Shawn (and Gus) of the Dead"	Steve Franks	Steve Franks	February 15, 2008	4.70

=== Season 3 (2008–09) ===
List of Psych season 3 episodes
No. overall	No. in season	Title	Directed by	Written by	Original release date	U.S. viewers (millions)
32	1	"Ghosts"	Stephen Surjik	Steve Franks	July 18, 2008	4.89
33	2	"Murder? … Anyone? … Anyone? … Bueller?"	Michael McMurray	Andy Berman	July 25, 2008	4.48
34	3	"Daredevils!"	John Badham	Anupam Nigam	August 1, 2008	4.29
35	4	"The Greatest Adventure in the History of Basic Cable"	Jay Chandrasekhar	Josh Bycel	August 8, 2008	3.40
36	5	"Disco Didn't Die. It Was Murdered!"	Mel Damski	Saladin K. Patterson	August 15, 2008	3.66
37	6	"There Might Be Blood"	John Badham	Kell Cahoon	August 22, 2008	3.96
38	7	"Talk Derby to Me"	Steve Miner	Tim Meltreger	September 5, 2008	4.23
39	8	"Gus Walks into a Bank"	Eric Laneuville	Andy Berman	September 12, 2008	4.02
40	9	"Christmas Joy"	John Landis	Saladin K. Patterson	November 28, 2008	3.71
41	10	"Six Feet Under the Sea"	Steve Franks	Steve Franks	January 9, 2009	4.14
42	11	"Lassie Did a Bad, Bad Thing"	Stephen Surjik	Kell Cahoon	January 16, 2009	3.65
43	12	"Earth, Wind and... Wait for It"	Tim Matheson	Anupam Nigam	January 23, 2009	3.83
44	13	"Any Given Friday Night at 10pm, 9pm Central"	Mel Damski	Josh Bycel	January 30, 2009	4.32
45	14	"Truer Lies"	Martha Coolidge	Victoria Walker	February 6, 2009	4.46
46	15	"Tuesday the 17th"	James Roday	Steve Franks & James Roday	February 13, 2009	4.27
47	16	"An Evening with Mr. Yang"	Mel Damski	Andy Berman & James Roday	February 20, 2009	4.83

=== Season 4 (2009–10) ===
List of Psych season 4 episodes
No. overall	No. in season	Title	Directed by	Written by	Original release date	U.S. viewers (millions)
48	1	"Extradition: British Columbia"	Steve Franks	Steve Franks	August 7, 2009	3.98
49	2	"He Dead"	Michael McMurray	Saladin K. Patterson	August 14, 2009	4.20
50	3	"High Noon-ish"	Mel Damski	Kell Cahoon	August 21, 2009	3.87
51	4	"The Devil's in the Details... and the Upstairs Bedroom"	John Badham	Bill Callahan	August 28, 2009	4.08
52	5	"Shawn Gets the Yips"	Tawnia McKiernan	Kell Cahoon & Bill Callahan	September 11, 2009	4.03
53	6	"Bollywood Homicide"	Jay Chandrasekhar	Steve Franks & Anupam Nigam	September 18, 2009	3.74
54	7	"High Top Fade-Out"	Stephen Surjik	Saladin K. Patterson & James Roday	September 25, 2009	3.69
55	8	"Let's Get Hairy"	Andrew Bernstein	Todd Harthan & James Roday	October 9, 2009	N/A
56	9	"Shawn Takes a Shot in the Dark"	Mel Damski	Andy Berman	October 16, 2009	3.68
57	10	"You Can't Handle This Episode"	Mel Damski	Andy Berman	January 27, 2010	4.37
58	11	"Thrill Seekers and Hell-Raisers"	Mel Damski	Kell Cahoon & Saladin K. Patterson	February 3, 2010	2.86
59	12	"A Very Juliet Episode"	Steve Franks	Steve Franks & Tim Meltreger	February 10, 2010	3.57
60	13	"Death Is in the Air"	Stephen Surjik	Bill Callahan & Anupam Nigam	February 17, 2010	2.94
61	14	"Think Tank"	Stephen Surjik	Steve Franks & Andy Berman	February 24, 2010	3.57
62	15	"The Head, the Tail, the Whole Damn Episode"	Matt Shakman	Steve Franks & Tim Meltreger	March 3, 2010	2.87
63	16	"Mr. Yin Presents..."	James Roday	Andy Berman & James Roday	March 10, 2010	2.95

=== Season 5 (2010) ===
List of Psych season 5 episodes
No. overall	No. in season	Title	Directed by	Written by	Original release date	U.S. viewers (millions)
64	1	"Romeo and Juliet and Juliet"	Steve Franks	Steve Franks	July 14, 2010	3.68
65	2	"Feet Don't Kill Me Now"	Mel Damski	Saladin K. Patterson	July 21, 2010	3.30
66	3	"Not Even Close... Encounters"	John Badham	Bill Callahan	July 28, 2010	3.74
67	4	"Chivalry Is Not Dead... But Someone Is"	Jay Chandrasekhar	Andy Berman	August 4, 2010	3.48
68	5	"Shawn and Gus in Drag (Racing)"	Mel Damski	Kell Cahoon & Tim Meltreger	August 11, 2010	3.78
69	6	"Viagra Falls"	Andrew Bernstein	Todd Harthan	August 18, 2010	4.11
70	7	"Ferry Tale"	Reginald Hudlin	Kell Cahoon & Saladin K. Patterson	August 25, 2010	3.63
71	8	"Shawn 2.0"	David Crabtree	Bill Callahan	September 1, 2010	3.70
72	9	"One, Maybe Two, Ways Out"	Mel Damski	Andy Berman & Todd Harthan	September 8, 2010	3.11
73	10	"Extradition II: The Actual Extradition Part"	Steve Franks	Steve Franks	November 10, 2010	2.79
74	11	"In Plain Fright"	Stephen Surjik	Steve Franks & Tim Meltreger	November 17, 2010	2.99
75	12	"Dual Spires"	Matt Shakman	Bill Callahan & James Roday	December 1, 2010	3.54
76	13	"We'd Like to Thank the Academy"	Tawnia McKiernan	Bill Callahan & Todd Harthan	December 8, 2010	3.09
77	14	"The Polarizing Express"	James Roday	Saladin K. Patterson & James Roday	December 15, 2010	2.43
78	15	"Dead Bear Walking"	Andy Berman	Andy Berman	December 15, 2010	2.53
79	16	"Yang 3 in 2D"	Mel Damski	Andy Berman & James Roday	December 22, 2010	2.90

=== Season 6 (2011–12) ===
List of Psych season 6 episodes
No. overall	No. in season	Title	Directed by	Written by	Original release date	U.S. viewers (millions)
80	1	"Shawn Rescues Darth Vader"	Steve Franks	Steve Franks	October 12, 2011	3.00
81	2	"Last Night Gus"	Andy Berman	Andy Berman	October 19, 2011	2.48
82	3	"This Episode Sucks"	James Roday	Todd Harthan & James Roday	October 26, 2011	3.28
83	4	"The Amazing Psych-Man & Tap Man, Issue #2"	Mel Damski	Saladin K. Patterson	November 2, 2011	3.08
84	5	"Dead Man's Curve Ball"	Mel Damski	Bill Callahan	November 9, 2011	2.45
85	6	"Shawn, Interrupted"	Andrew Bernstein	Kell Cahoon	November 16, 2011	2.46
86	7	"In for a Penny..."	Mel Damski	Todd Harthan	November 30, 2011	3.17
87	8	"The Tao of Gus"	John Badham	Tim Meltreger	December 7, 2011	2.70
88	9	"Neil Simon's Lover's Retreat"	Brad Turner	Carlos Jacott	December 14, 2011	3.03
89	10	"Indiana Shawn and the Temple of the Kinda Crappy, Rusty Old Dagger"	Steve Franks	Steve Franks	February 29, 2012	2.46
90	11	"Heeeeere's Lassie"	James Roday	Todd Harthan & Tim Meltreger	March 7, 2012	2.86
91	12	"Shawn and the Real Girl"	Timothy Busfield	Andy Berman	March 14, 2012	2.57
92	13	"Let's Doo-Wop It Again"	Jay Chandrasekhar	Saladin K. Patterson & Kell Cahoon	March 21, 2012	2.73
93	14	"Autopsy Turvy"	Jennifer Lynch	Andy Berman & James Roday	March 28, 2012	2.36
94	15	"True Grits"	Reginald Hudlin	Saladin K. Patterson	April 4, 2012	2.64
95	16	"Santabarbaratown"	David Crabtree	Bill Callahan	April 11, 2012	2.71

=== Season 7 (2013) ===
List of Psych season 7 episodes
No. overall	No. in season	Title	Directed by	Written by	Original release date	U.S. viewers (millions)
96	1	"Santabarbaratown 2"	Mel Damski	Steve Franks & Bill Callahan	February 27, 2013	2.94
97	2	"Juliet Takes a Luvvah"	Andy Berman	Andy Berman	March 6, 2013	2.81
98	3	"Lassie Jerky"	James Roday	James Roday	March 13, 2013	3.04
99	4	"No Country for Two Old Men"	Mel Damski	Kell Cahoon	March 20, 2013	2.45
100	5	"100 Clues"	Matt Shakman	Todd Harthan	March 27, 2013	2.93
101	6	"Cirque Du Soul"	Jennifer Lynch	Saladin K. Patterson	April 3, 2013	2.41
102	7	"Deez Nups"	James Roday	Bill Callahan & James Roday	April 10, 2013	2.25
103	8	"Right Turn or Left for Dead"	David Crabtree	Carlos Jacott	April 17, 2013	2.77
104	9	"Juliet Wears the Pantsuit"	Jennifer Lynch	Brittany Hilgers	April 24, 2013	2.46
105	10	"Santa Barbarian Candidate"	Richard Coleman	Tim Meltreger	May 1, 2013	2.35
106	11	"Office Space"	Andrew Bernstein	Andy Berman & Todd Harthan	May 8, 2013	2.29
107	12	"Dead Air"	Saladin K. Patterson	Saladin K. Patterson & Kell Cahoon	May 15, 2013	2.31
108	13	"Nip and Suck It!"	Mel Damski	Carlos Jacott & Tim Meltreger	May 22, 2013	2.48
109	14	"No Trout About It"	Brad Turner	Bill Callahan & Carlos Jacott	May 29, 2013	2.18

=== The Musical (2013) ===
List of Psych season 7 episodes
No. overall	Title	Directed by	Written by	Original release date	U.S. viewers (millions)
110	Psych: The Musical	Steve Franks	Steve Franks	December 15, 2013	2.23
111	Psych: The Musical	Steve Franks	Steve Franks	December 15, 2013	2.23

=== Season 8 (2014) ===
List of Psych season 8 episodes
No. overall	No. in season	Title	Directed by	Written by	Original release date	U.S. viewers (millions)
112	1	"Lock, Stock, Some Smoking Barrels and Burton Guster's Goblet of Fire"	Steve Franks	Kell Cahoon & Steve Franks	January 8, 2014	2.28
113	2	"S.E.I.Z.E. the Day"	David Crabtree	Todd Harthan	January 15, 2014	1.51
114	3	"Remake A.K.A. Cloudy... With a Chance of Improvement"	Andy Berman	Andy Berman & Todd Harthan	January 22, 2014	1.61
115	4	"Someone's Got a Woody"	Mel Damski	Andy Berman & Saladin K. Patterson	January 29, 2014	1.73
116	5	"COG Blocked"	Brad Turner	Carlos Jacott	February 5, 2014	1.79
117	6	"1967: A Psych Odyssey"	Kirsten Nelson	Tim Meltreger & James Roday	February 26, 2014	1.53
118	7	"Shawn and Gus Truck Things Up"	David Crabtree	Saladin K. Patterson	March 5, 2014	1.56
119	8	"A Touch of Sweevil"	Richard Coleman	Kell Cahoon & Todd Harthan	March 12, 2014	1.36
120	9	"A Nightmare on State Street"	James Roday	Carlos Jacott	March 19, 2014	1.53
121	10	"The Break-Up"	Steve Franks	Steve Franks	March 26, 2014	1.93

== Film series (2017–21) ==
List of Psych films
No. film	Title	Directed by	Written by	Original release date	U.S. viewers (millions)
1	Psych: The Movie	Steve Franks	Steve Franks & James Roday	December 7, 2017	1.26
2	Psych 2: Lassie Come Home	Steve Franks	Steve Franks & James Roday Rodriguez & Andy Berman	July 15, 2020	N/A
3	Psych 3: This Is Gus	Steve Franks	Steve Franks & James Roday Rodriguez	November 18, 2021	N/A

== Viewing figures ==
=== Seasons 1–4 ===
Psych : U.S. viewers per episode (millions)

Season	Episode number															
Season	1	2	3	4	5	6	7	8	9	10	11	12	13	14	15	16
1	6.06	4.71	4.69	4.35	4.72	4.76	4.89	4.64	3.78	3.70	3.81	3.60	3.20	3.74	4.48	–
2	4.33	3.90	4.81	3.73	4.43	3.81	4.25	3.73	4.15	3.67	4.69	3.86	4.66	4.07	3.51	4.70
3	4.89	4.48	4.29	3.40	3.66	3.96	4.23	4.02	3.71	4.14	3.65	3.83	4.32	4.46	4.27	4.83
4	3.98	4.20	3.87	4.08	4.03	3.74	3.69	3.34	3.68	4.37	2.86	3.57	2.94	3.57	2.87	2.95

Audience measurement performed by Nielsen Media Research

=== Seasons 5–8 ===
Psych : U.S. viewers per episode (millions)

Season	Episode number															
Season	1	2	3	4	5	6	7	8	9	10	11	12	13	14	15	16
5	3.98	3.30	3.74	3.48	3.78	4.11	3.63	3.70	3.11	2.79	2.99	3.54	3.09	2.43	2.53	2.90
6	3.00	2.48	3.28	3.08	2.45	2.46	3.17	2.70	3.03	2.46	2.86	2.57	2.73	2.36	2.64	2.71
7	2.94	2.81	3.04	2.45	2.93	2.41	2.25	2.77	2.46	2.35	2.29	2.31	2.48	2.18	2.23	–
8	2.28	1.51	1.61	1.73	1.79	1.53	1.56	1.36	1.53	1.93	–					

Audience measurement performed by Nielsen Media Research
