= Speak Now or Forever Hold Your Piece =

- Psych episode
- Episode no.: Season 1 Episode 3
- Directed by: Michael Zinberg
- Written by: Steve Franks
- Production code: 1003
- Original air date: July 21, 2006
- Running time: 42 minutes

Guest appearances
- Kirsten Nelson as Chief Karen Vick; Sage Brocklebank as Officer Buzz McNab; Tom Butler as Attorney General Maxwell; Gina Holden as Bethany; Diego Klattenhoff as Dylan Maxwell; Christine Chatelain as Lacey Maxwell

Episode chronology
| ← Previous "Spellingg Bee" | Next → "Woman Seeking Dead Husband: Smokers Okay, No Pets" |
- Psych season 1

"Speak Now or Forever Hold Your Piece" is the third episode of the first season of the American comedy-drama television series Psych. It was written by writer and co-executive producer Steve Franks, and was directed by assistant director Michael Zinberg. The episode originally aired on USA Network in the United States on July 21, 2006. The installment features guest appearances by Kirsten Nelson, Sage Brocklebank, Tom Butler, and Gina Holden among others.

In the episode, a multimillion-dollar engagement ring is stolen from a hotel vault, and Shawn Spencer (James Roday) and Burton "Gus" Guster (Dulé Hill) investigate, without the permission of the police department. They visit the hotel, where Shawn gets keys to every room. Shawn becomes involved with the ceremony, and finds out everything that has been happening leading up to the wedding. While investigating, they discover the dead body of a suspect. During the ceremony, Shawn realizes what happened, and interrupts to solve it.

"Speak Now or Forever Hold Your Piece" received mixed reviews from critics. At the time of its broadcast, the installment was considered to be the worst episode of the first season. According to the Nielsen Media Research, the episode was watched by 4.69 million viewers during its original broadcast, and received a 1.6 rating among viewers in the 18–49 demographic. The installment's rebroadcast on NBC was viewed by just 4 million people.

== Plot ==
In 1985, Shawn Spencer (Liam James) is looking for Gus. Henry Spencer (Corbin Bernsen) shows Shawn how to sneak around, hiding within his lesson the message to "do the little things right". In present day, Shawn (James Roday) sneaks into the police briefing room, where he discovers that a five-million dollar engagement ring has been stolen from a hotel vault. Without permission, Shawn and Gus (Dulé Hill) take the case. Shawn is given an invitation to the wedding. While at the hotel, Shawn listens into Detective Lassiter's (Timothy Omundson) brief about the investigation, and gains valuable information. Dietrich Manheim (Guy Fauchon), a hotel staff member becomes the police's main suspect. After tricking the hotel receptionist, Shawn gains access to the rooms of all police officers and wedding attendees. Shawn walks in on a pre-wedding party, and discovers that the florist quit, and the bridesmaids and groomsmen had to make their own wedding bouquets. Shawn and Gus break into Lassiter's room, and discover an insurance policy on the ring, with a major value.

Gus decides they need to see the safe; however, the only way they can access it is through the ventilation shafts. When opening a panel to access the shaft system, they discover Manheim's dead body. Shawn "psychically" reveals this to the police, using it as a way to distract them while he watches the security footage for the vault. After viewing the footage, they hold a bachelor party where Shawn questions all of the attendees. Shawn talks with Lacey Maxwell (Christine Chatelain), the sister of the groom, who asks him to get her bouquet from a locked cooler, but he can't. Before the wedding, the bouquets are passed out, and Lacey panics when hers isn't there. Lacey reveals she is a magician when she helps to calm down the flower girl. Shawn realizes who stole the ring and killed Manheim, but his realization occurs in the middle of the ceremony. Shawn interrupts the wedding with a "psychic episode", and exposes Lacey to everyone.

== Production ==
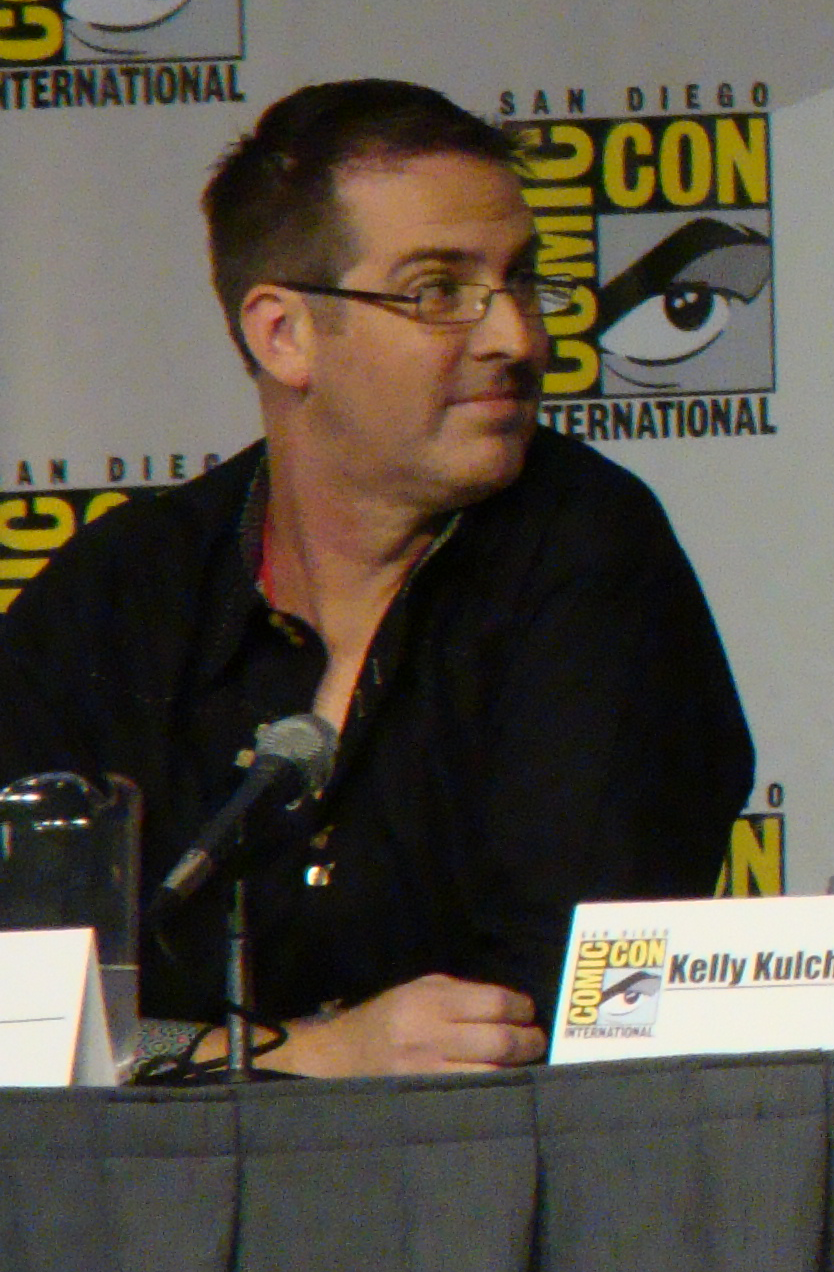
Steve Franks wrote the episode, his third straight work for the show

"Speak Now or Forever Hold Your Piece" was the first episode directed by assistant director Michael Zinberg. The installment was the third of the series written by writer and co-executive producer Steve Franks; he had previously written the season's first two episodes "Pilot" and "Spellingg Bee". Stacy Hillman was the episode's associate producer, and Erin Smith was the production manager. Michael McMurray was the installment's director of photography, while Gordon Rimpel and Anupam Nigam acted as the editors. The music for the episode was written by Adam Cohen and John Robert Wood. Assistant directors for the installment were Jack Hardy and Roger Russell.

In addition to the regular cast, guest stars for the episode included Kirsten Nelson, who played interim police chief Karen Vick, a major reoccurring character, and Sage Brocklebank as junior police officer Buzz McNab, also a main reoccurring character. Other guests included Tom Butler (who played Attorney General Maxwell), Gina Holden (who played Bethany), Diego Klattenhoff (who played Dylan Maxwell), and Christine Chatelain (who played Lacey Maxwell). The episode first aired in the United States on USA Network on July 21, 2006, with a rating of TV-PG. The episode was aired in the U.S. on August 14, 2006, on NBC, in an 8 p.m. time slot.

"Speak Now or Forever Hold Your Piece", along with the fourteen other episodes from Psych's first season were released on a four-disc DVD set in the United States on June 26, 2007. The set included full audio commentaries for six episodes, deleted scenes, blooper reals, audition tapes, character profiles, the international version of the episode "Pilot", an "Inside the writer's room" featurette, and other special features. The entire first season was released on the iTunes store for digital download, as well as downloads for individual episodes.

Included on the DVD set were deleted scenes for "Speak Now or Forever Hold Your Piece". The feature consisted of four scenes, amassing approximately 3 minutes of video. The deleted scenes consist of Young Shawn following tracks left by Gus leading to his hiding spot, Chief Vick confronting Shawn and Gus when she meets them in the hotel, the police removing Manheim's body from the hotel while Officer McNab presents items taken from his locker, and Detective Lassiter getting into a confrontation with an elderly lady manning the guestbook for the wedding.

== Reception ==
According to the Nielsen Media Research, "Speak Now or Forever Hold Your Piece" was watched by a total of 4.69 million people in its original American broadcast. It earned a 1.6 rating/5 share in the 18–49 demographic. It was viewed by 1.3 million people within the 18–49 demographic, and 1.3 million people in 25–54 demographic. The installment was the seventh most watched basic cable program for its air date in the 18–49 demographic. This was a slight decrease from the show's previous episode, "Spellingg Bee", which was viewed by 4.71 million viewers, or 3.35 million households. After its airing on August 14 on NBC, the episode was viewed by 4 million households, and received a 1.3 rating/4 share in the 18–49 demographic.

Since airing, the episode has received mixed reviews. In his review for IGN, contributor Colin Moriarty heavily criticized the episode and show, calling them, "at best, a mediocre adventure in detective comedy television". He considered the episode "mindless" when compared to Monk, which preceded the episode. Moriarty stated that, when not comparing Psych to other shows, the episode is still "making you wonder what the hell is going on in the minds of the show's writers and producers". He questioned the show's ability to last due to having to continue the fake psychic concept, and called detectives Lassiter and O'Hara "completely unlikeable". Moriarty stated that things in the installment "simply don't make any sense". He questioned whether the show would be able to last more than one season, and said that "we highly recommend you continue to take a pass on Psych and save yourself from the mindlessness of it all". The installment was given a rating of 6, or "okay", tying it for the lowest rated episode of the season, with the preceding episode, "Spellingg Bee".

However, in his review for TV Squad, writer Richard Keller praised the episode, calling it "a very good episode for both James Roday and Dule Hill". He stated that he "really liked this week's episode", and that "After testing the waters in the first two programs both Shawn and Gus really did some heavy detective work this episode". He also praised the rotating of Shawn's abilities, saying that "it showed that Psych could be more than just a one trick pony". He compared Roday to Ben Stiller, and called the scene involving Gus after the bachelorette party the best of the episode. Keller declared that "Psych is finally settling into its niche and, hopefully, will only get stronger from here".
