= Spellingg Bee =

- Psych episode
- Episode no.: Season 1 Episode 2
- Directed by: Mel Damski
- Written by: Steve Franks
- Production code: 1002
- Original air date: July 14, 2006
- Running time: 43 minutes

Guest appearances
- Kirsten Nelson as Chief Karen Vick; Kyle Pejpar as Young Shawn Spencer; Jeremy Loheir as Young Burton Guster; Alex Bruhanski as Spellmaster Cavanaugh; Issey Lamb as Brandon Vu; Alexander Calvert as Jiri Prochazka; Richard Zeman as Miklous Prochazka; Bud Collins as himself

Episode chronology
← Previous "Pilot"	Next → "Speak Now or Forever Hold Your Piece"
- Psych season 1

"Spellingg Bee", also known as "The Spellingg Bee", is the second episode of the first season of the American comedy-drama detective television series Psych. It was written by series creator and co-executive producer Steve Franks, and was directed by co-executive producer and director Mel Damski during November and December 2005. The episode originally aired on USA Network in the United States on July 14, 2006. The installment features guest appearances by Kirsten Nelson, Alexander Calvert, Kyle Pejpar, and Jeremy Loheir, among others. It also features an appearance by sportscaster Bud Collins.

The series follows Shawn Spencer (James Roday) and his assistant Burton "Gus" Guster (Dulé Hill), who operate a fake psychic detective agency, which is actually based on Shawn's hyperobservant ability. In the episode, Shawn and Gus are watching a spelling bee on TV when the expected champion collapses suddenly. Suspecting a set-up, they investigate the bee. While there, the spellmaster (Alex Bruhanski) suspiciously falls over a railing to his death, strengthening their beliefs in foul play. With help from Shawn's father, Henry Spencer (Corbin Bernsen) they discover poison in the spellmaster's meal, confirming their thoughts. Shawn realizes that the entire situation was created by a contestant and his father in order to cover up that they were cheating.

The installment was originally written to be the third episode of the season, but was moved up by the show's producers to introduce the character Juliet O'Hara earlier. Like most episodes of the series, it was filmed in and around the city of Vancouver, British Columbia, Canada. "Spellingg Bee" received mixed-to-positive reception from television critics. According to Nielsen Media Research, the episode was watched by 4.71 million people during its original broadcast, making up approximately 3.35 million households. It received a 1.5 rating/5 share among viewers in the 18–49 demographic. Actor Dulé Hill was nominated for an award at the 13th NAMIC Vision Awards for his performance in the episode.

== Plot ==
Shawn Spencer (James Roday) buys a newspaper and walks back into a restaurant to find his seat taken. The girl in his seat introduces herself as Juliet O'Hara (Maggie Lawson). Shawn realizes she's a cop, and immediately after he does, she and several officers arrest a man at the bar. Later, Burton "Gus" Guster (Dulé Hill) is in the Psych office, watching the local spelling bee on TV. Shortly after Shawn enters the office, expected spelling bee champion Brandon Vu (Issey Lamb) collapses, to the shock of the audience. Shawn notices something wrong with Vu's inhaler, and realizes that Vu was intentionally harmed. They receive a phone call from interim police chief Karen Vick (Kirsten Nelson) asking them to investigate the bee. They interview Vu at the hospital, who tells them that his inhaler was not working during the competition. They begin individual interviews with the competitors, but discover no leads. While they are waiting between interviews, spellmaster Cavanaugh (Alex Bruhanski) experiences chest pain and falls over a railing to his death, in front of Shawn and Gus. The police write off his death as a heart attack; Shawn and Gus are skeptical, and break into Cavanaugh's booth to investigate.

Gus finds Cavanaugh's lunch, and believes that it is poisoned due to its unusual smell. Shawn takes it to his father, Henry Spencer (Corbin Bernsen), to have it analyzed. Henry demands that in return, Shawn must build a dog house he promised to make in 1989. Shawn agrees, and leaves. While riding back to the office, he is run off the road by a mysterious van. Shawn wakes up in the hospital, and after he gets out, Gus informs him that he discovered another fake inhaler. Shawn returns to Henry's house to finish the dog house. Henry confirms that the lunch was poisoned, and Shawn returns to the bee. He disguises himself as the new spellmaster in order to enter the booth, and discovers that Cavanaugh had found out that Miklous Prochazka (Richard Zeman) was helping his son Jiri (Alexander Calvert), a contestant in the bee, to cheat by spelling out his son's words to him in Morse code using electrical impulses that were transferred to his false inhaler. After the bee has finished, Shawn has a "psychic vision" where he reveals everything to the police, who arrest Miklous and his son.

== Production ==
=== Cast and crew ===
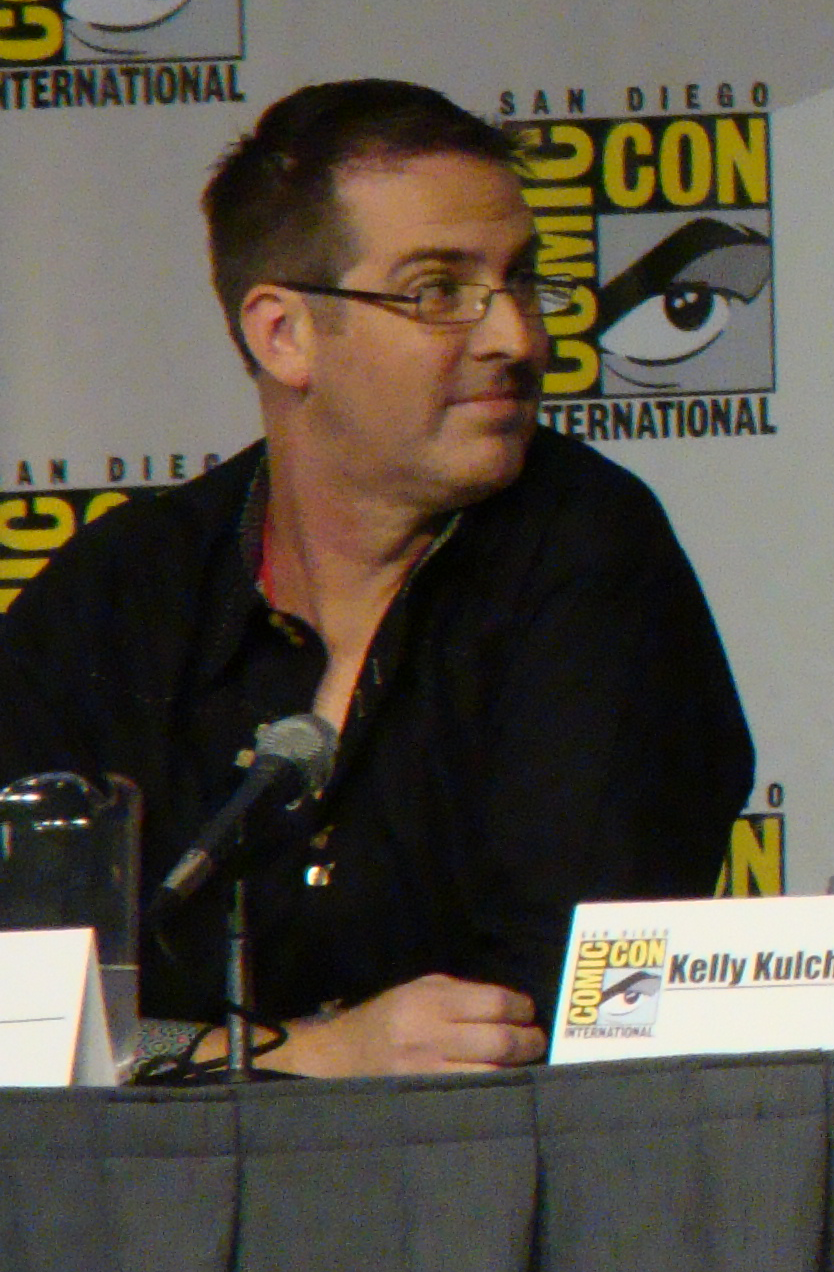
Steve Franks wrote the episode, his second work on the show

"Spellingg Bee" was the first episode directed by co-executive producer and director Mel Damski. The episode was the second installment written by co-executive producer and creator Steve Franks, after the previous episode "Pilot". Tracey Jeffery was the episode's producer, John J. Sakmar and Jerry Lenhart were the consulting producers, and Mel Damski, Steve Franks, Kelly Kulchak, and Chris Henze were the associate producers. Erin Smith was the production manager. Tracy Hillman was the installment's associate producer, and Michael McMurray was the director of photography, while Allan Lee and Anupam Nigam acted as the editors. David Crabtree, James Ilecic, Allan Lee, and Gordon Rempel were the script editors. The music for the episode was written by Adam Cohen and John Robert Wood. Assistant directors for the installment were Jack Hardy and Roger Russell.

The episode was originally planned to be the third installment of the season, but was moved up by the show's producers in order to introduce the major character Juliet O'Hara, played by Maggie Lawson. The scene introducing O'Hara was filmed as part of the fourth episode, "Woman Seeking Dead Husband: Smokers Okay, No Pets", but was added to the installment because of the need to bring in the character. It was also used for Lawson's audition for the show. Kyle Pejpar and Julien Hill were cast to play Young Shawn and Young Gus in the episode. The show's casting directors brought in the actors because older versions of young Shawn and Gus were needed for the flashback scenes in the episode. Sportscaster Bud Collins guest starred in the episode. Collins wrote all of his dialogue, and designed his own wardrobe for the installment.

In addition, another guest star for the episode was Kirsten Nelson, who played interim police chief Karen Vick, a major recurring character who first premiered in the episode "Pilot". Shortly before the installment was filmed, Kirsten Nelson gave birth to her daughter, which would later be portrayed in the episode "Shawn vs. the Red Phantom". Other minor guests included Alex Bruhanski (who played Spellmaster Cavanaugh), Issey Lamb (who played Brandon Vu), Alexander Calvert (who played Jiri Prochazka), Richard Zeman (who played Miklous Prochazka), and Brendan Beiser (who played the bee's color commentator).

=== Writing and filming ===
Steve Franks and his wife, April, went to Santa Barbara on their honeymoon. At the time, he was developing the idea for Psych. He knew he didn't want a big city atmosphere. He wanted a place that was beautiful.

— Mel Damski, speaking on the decision for the filming location of Psych.

The show is meant to take place in the Southern California city of Santa Barbara; however, most of the series is filmed in Vancouver, British Columbia, and the surrounding communities. The majority of the scenes are filmed in the suburb community of White Rock, especially those including the ocean or coastline. Speaking about filming the show, Steve Franks stated that "I swear it's San Clemente, CA. It couldn't look more like it". In order to make the sets appear as Santa Barbara, the show's crew members installed many props stereotypical to Southern California, including fake palm trees, surfboards, and the California-published newspaper, the Santa Maria Sun. The production crew had to truck in eight palm trees to each set during filming.

Several of the show's filming sets were changed between episodes. The Psych office was expanded and refurnished, afterwards becoming the second largest stage for the show. The house for Henry Spencer was changed, in order to be closer to the ocean. The set for Chief Vick's office was also changed, and was repainted to brighten the scenes shot in it. Much of the episode was filmed on a sound stage, while several other scenes were filmed in the basement of the facility. Much of the installment was written to take place in Santa Barbara's Arlington Theater. Several of the episode's scenes were written by Franks while filming the pilot episode.

In order to make the show seem more realistic, Franks and other writers talked to his father, a former Los Angeles police officer, and several psychics. Much of the episode's content was improvised by the actors, and Roday included a pineapple in the episode, continuing the reoccurring theme on the show. James Roday talked to producers about including singing in the series' second episode, but the idea was shut down because it was too soon in the show. In addition, Steve Franks considered writing one of the show's early episodes to be about a psychic claiming Shawn was a fraud, but delayed writing the episode until later. The producers attempted to include themes against smoking and the issues of friendship. Franks also included a character named Mrs. Foote, a reference to his 1999 movie Big Daddy.

== Release ==
The episode was originally broadcast in the United States on July 14, 2006, on USA Network as the second episode of the show's first season. It aired at a 10:00 P.M. EST/PST time slot, following a new episode of the show Monk. The show's previous installment, "Pilot", was a special extended episode, running for approximately 66 minutes. "Spellingg Bee" was the first installment of the show to run for a normal length, approximately 43 minutes. An encore was aired by USA Network's sister broadcast network NBC on August 7, 2006.

"Spellingg Bee", along with the fourteen other episodes from Psych's first season were released on a four-disc DVD set in the United States and Canada on June 26, 2007. The set includes full audio commentaries for six episodes, including "Spellingg Bee", deleted scenes for most episodes, blooper reals, audition tapes, character profiles, the international version of the episode "Pilot", an "Inside the writers' room" featurette, and other special features. The set is filmed in 1.78:1 aspect ratio, with English subtitles available, and Dolby Digital 5.1 Surround. The DVD set was released in the United Kingdom and other Region 2 countries on January 9, 2008, and was released in Australia on April 30 of the same year. The entire first season has also been released on the iTunes store for digital download, as well as independent downloads of each individual episode.

== Reception ==
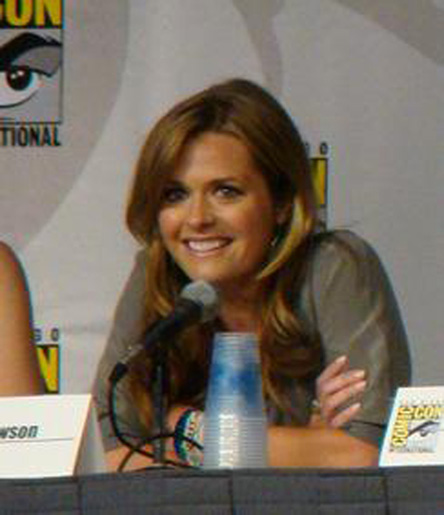
The importance of Maggie Lawson's character Juliet O'Hara was questioned from the beginning

=== Ratings ===
According to the Nielsen Media Research, in its original American broadcast, "Spellingg Bee" was viewed by a total of 4.71 million people. Approximately 3.35 million households were watching the installment during its initial broadcast. The episode earned a 1.5 rating/5 share in the 18–49 demographic, meaning that on average 1.5 percent of all television-equipped households were tuned into the installment at any given moment, while 5 percent of households watching TV were tuned into it during the time slot. Approximately 1.8 million people in 25–54 demographic also viewed the episode. The installment was the most watched basic cable program for its air date. "Spellingg Bee" was ranked eighth in total viewers in the week of July 10–16, falling slightly behind its lead-in program, Monk, which was viewed by 4.89 million people. The installment's ratings were a major drop from the show's previous episode, "Pilot", which was viewed by 6.06 million people, and had a 1.9 rating/6 share. "Spellingg Bee" finished fourth in viewership for Psych's first season, falling behind the pilot, "Weekend Warriors" (4.76 million), and "9 Lives" (4.72 million).

=== Critical reception ===
Since airing, the episode has received mixed to positive reviews. In his review for IGN, contributor Colin Moriarty heavily criticized the episode, calling it "unintentionally lackluster". While Moriarty considered Hill to portray Gus well, he considered Juliet O'Hara and Carlton Lassiter's characters "rather forgettable" and stated that "neither character has any traits that make them interesting in the least". He considered the show to be "admittedly in a difficult spot". Moriarty criticized the show's police force, calling it "possibly miscast". He called the episode "mildly entertaining and mildly boring" and that the show is "not looking too good". The installment was given a rating of 6, or "okay", tying it for the lowest rated episode of the season, with the following episode, "Speak Now or Forever Hold Your Piece". In an article for The New York Times, journalist Bill Carter mentions that after just the two episodes, "USA Network seems to have found another drama hit with 'Psych'".

In his review for TV Squad, writer Richard Keller gave the episode a mixed to positive review, calling the installment "pretty unique", but that it also had its flaws. He enjoyed the fact that the episode revealed the relationship between Shawn and Henry, that it "reflects the relationship many of us have with our own fathers". He also enjoyed the "fleshing out" of Gus's character, that "we now see Gus as quite the brainiac" and "rather than saying nothing but 'No, Shawn'... Gus actually contributes quite a bit to this episode". However, Keller also criticized parts of the episode, saying that he disliked the "whole fake psychic concept". Keller also criticized Timothy Omundson's character Carlton Lassiter, saying "he just doesn't fit into the whole show", and "Omundson's makes Lassiter look like a cartoon character". In a comment for TV Guide, the show was called "a diamond in the rough", and writer Matt Roush called star James Roday "a delight". The episode was included in Yahoo! TV's list of the nerdiest episodes of Psych. Reviewer Tucker Cummings said that "the wordplay in this episode great" and that "it gives you a great insight into how Gus and Shawn's friendship has functioned (or dysfunctioned) over the years". In addition, she said that the episode's murder-mystery plot "is actually really engrossing" when compared to later episodes of the show.

In a review of the Syfy channel series Eureka, Boston Globe critic Matthew Gilbert compared the series to Psych, describing both as having "light-hearted dramedic tones". A few days after the episode aired, Virginia Rohan of The Record called the show a "promising series". Several critics compared the episode and show to the then-new Lifetime network series Angela's Eyes; in his article for the Los Angeles Daily News, journalist David Kronke stated that "Lifetime's new crime drama 'Angela's Eyes' is essentially the USA Network's new series 'Psych' inside out and played without laughs". In an article for the Akron Beacon Journal, Angela's Eyes main character Abigail Spencer was compared to Shawn Spencer, who was described as being "so good that people don't believe what he can figure out". Psych was also described as having "a much simpler premise", but being more entertaining than Angela's Eyes.

The installment has been very positively received by the show's cast and crew. Series creator Steve Franks was asked by iTunes in 2009 to select his twelve favorite episodes to be put on a special DVD release. The collection, titled Psych: Twelve Episodes That Will Make You Happy, contained four episodes from the first season, including "Spellingg Bee". When describing the episode, Franks stated that "The Spellingg Bee has my one of my favorite scenes in the run of the show when Shawn takes over for the spellmaster and has to investigate a murder while making up words for the contestants to spell". In 2013, iTunes asked stars James Roday and Dulé Hill to select their 20 favorite episodes from the show. The DVD collection was titled Psych: James and Dule's Top 20, with "Spellingg Bee" was selected as #14 on the collection, picked by Roday. Three other episodes from the first season were also selected.

=== Accolades ===
For his performance in portraying Burton "Gus" Guster in the episode, Dulé Hill was nominated to win the award for "Best Actor–Comedy" at the 13th Annual NAMIC Vision Awards. The awards are organized by the National Association for Multi-ethnicity in Communications (NAMIC), and are given for "outstanding achievements in original, multi-ethnic cable programming". Other nominees for the award were Carlos Mencia, Romany Malco, and Damon Wayans. Hill lost the award to Mencia, for received it for his performance in the Comedy Central program Mind of Mencia.

List of awards and nominations received by "Spellingg Bee"
Year	Award	Category	Nominee	Result	Notes
2007	13th NAMIC Vision Awards	Best Actor–Comedy	Dulé Hill	Nominated	
