= Idlette =

Idlette is a surname. Notable people with the surname include:

- LaVonne Idlette (born 1985), Dominican Republic hurdler
- Patricia Idlette, American actress who also worked in Canada
