= Carlton Lassiter =

- Psych character
- Timothy Omundson as Carlton Lassiter
- First appearance: "Pilot" (Psych; 2006)
- Created by: Steve Franks and Andy Berman
- Portrayed by: Timothy Omundson

In-universe information
- Nickname: Lassie; Binky; Booker; Detective Dipstick
- Gender: Male
- Occupation: Santa Barbara Chief of Police (2014–present); Santa Barbara Police Head Detective (1996–2014)
- Family: Unnamed father; Mona Lassiter (mother); Althea (stepmother); Lauren Lassiter (younger sister); Unnamed brother (mentioned in blog); Lilly Nora Lassiter (daughter)
- Spouse: Victoria Parker (divorced) Marlowe Viccellio (m. 2012)
- Relatives: Peter Parker (ex-nephew); Muscum T. Lassiter (great-great-grandfather); Raul Parker (ex-brother-in-law); Irving Parker (ex-father-in-law)

Detective Carlton Jebediah "Lassie" Lassiter MCJ is a fictional character in the American sitcom Psych and the sequel film series of the same name, played by Timothy Omundson.

== Fictional biography ==
One of the main supporting characters of the detective comedy-drama show Psych, Lassiter is a ten-year veteran of the Santa Barbara Police Department, and the youngest Head Detective ever named to the force. He also has a Master's Degree in Criminology. He has a tense relationship with Shawn Spencer that often leads to exceedingly funny situations. According to Lassiter's blog, which is written by actor Timothy Omundson, he was a close friend of the former Santa Barbara police chief, who led him to enroll in the police academy during a "dangerous point" in Lassiter's youth.

Upon his first appearance in the series pilot, Lassiter is said to be five months into a trial separation from his wife, Victoria, although he later, when drunk, confesses that they have in fact been separated for two years. Part of their marriage troubles appear to stem from a disagreement over the matter of children. Lassiter says his wife believes that he does not want children, although this is not the case. Omundson says that, despite Lassiter's long estrangement from his wife, it would likely be very hard for him to admit that the marriage is over because "that means admitting failure, and Lassiter will never admit to failure." During the pilot, Lassiter is involved in a secret romance with his partner, Detective Lucinda Barry (Anne Dudek); however, soon after Shawn Spencer publicly exposes the nature of their relationship, Barry is transferred and the affair appears to have ended. She is replaced by Junior Detective Juliet O'Hara.

Eventually, Lassiter's wife asks him to dinner, something he thinks points to reconciliation for them, but in truth, she simply wants to give him divorce papers. Saddened but resigned, he signs them, telling her he's going to let go of the past and think of the future without her. She tells him she will never stop loving him, even though they are divorced.

It was first mentioned in Lassiter's blog that he has a sister; in the season 5 episode "Dead Bear Walking", she is revealed to be a younger sister named Lauren, played by April Bowlby. Lauren visits Lassiter to film a documentary about police work. After meeting Shawn and Gus, she is impressed by their methods and decides to film them instead, which irritates Lassiter. After seeing Lassiter one-upped by Shawn and Gus again, Lauren shares with them that she looked up to Lassiter when she was growing up, and says that he may not be the man she thought he was after all. With a little help from Shawn, Lassiter is able to solve the case which restores his view in Lauren's eyes. She tells Lassiter that she is proud of him. Other family members include a missing brother who may or may not be in South America, a brother-in-law named Raul, a nephew named Peter, and an overbearing mother who is involved in a lesbian relationship with a black woman named Althea. In the second film "Psych 2: Lassie Come Home" it is revealed that Lassiter's father, played by Joel McHale, died in surgery when Lassiter was a child. In the episode "High Noon(ish)" it is said that Lassiter's mother never had time to take care of him and dropped him off at Old Sonora, a tourist Western town, every weekend. Additionally, it is revealed in the episode "Weekend Warriors" that Lassiter is an avid Civil War buff who actively participates in reenactments.

In the fifth season episode "Not Even Close... Encounters" it is shown that Lassiter has a physical "crap list" from which he removes Shawn's dad Henry. People on the list include Hillary Clinton (twice), Carley Simon [sic], Chris Tucker, Olympia Dukakis, Shawn Spencer, Tyne Daly (with whom Omundson co-starred in Judging Amy), Rick Sanchez, Marco Sanchez, Mark Sanchez, and many other names including his mother and the "Check out Girl @ the A+P" (may be an old grudge as there are no A+Ps in California anymore). Along with Henry's, some other names are crossed out, which may include Hilary Swank. Henry's name is immediately put back on the list after he is shown it and says Lassiter's list "disturbs" him.

In the sixth season episode "This Episode Sucks", Lassiter meets a woman at a local bar named Marlowe Viccellio. The two hit it off, and begin dating soon after. Marlowe is wrapped up in the criminal plot of the episode, and is sent to jail; however, Lassiter touchingly gives her a note stating that he will wait for her for the six to eighteen months that she is in prison. In "Heeeeere's Lassie", he buys a condo for Marlowe and him, since she is almost finished with her prison time. In "Let's Doo-Wop It Again", Marlowe assists him in a case by befriending an incarcerated gang leader, though to win her trust, Marlowe publicly punches Lassiter in the face.

During the 7th season, Marlowe gets paroled. Her parole officer is an officer whom Lassiter didn't call back after sleeping with her. She implements rules designed to keep the two apart, including a no non-spousal cohabitation rule. Marlowe moves in with Juliet and Shawn, who are trying to start a life as a couple. The separation (and the strain on Marlowe's roommates) becomes insufferable and the two announce their intent to marry, which they do in the next episode. In Season 8 Episode 2, S.E.I.Z.E. the Day, Marlowe reveals to Lassiter that they are expecting their first child. Lassiter tells a suspect about this, and Shawn, Gus and Juliet overhear. In the episode 'Shawn and Gus Truck Things Up', Marlowe goes into labor and has a baby girl in a food truck.

In the series finale, Shawn is about to confess on a video farewell to not being psychic but Lassiter destroys the disc first, showing that while he always knew the truth about Shawn, he has come to accept Spencer as a friend; it may also have been a way to "keep the mystery alive" in a way that Shawn would approve, or as a way to prevent cases Spencer solved to be reopened and marked as a mistrial.

== Characterization ==
Lassiter distrusts Shawn in general and does not believe his claims of being psychic. He is also the only character in the series to have (correctly) guessed from the beginning that Shawn invented the story about being psychic to avoid investigation and became trapped in the lies; this strongly contrasts Henry, who already knew about Shawn's honed observational and deductive abilities. After several years of working together, Lassiter summarizes his criticisms of Shawn, stating, "I’ve known you for six years, Spencer. I know your little act. You do your little dance, you beat polygraph machines. You always manage to guess the right culprit after missing the first four or five times. You whip that hair around and fall over every reasonable girl that Guster hasn’t unsuccessfully hit on already."

However, over time he has developed a grudging respect for Shawn's investigation skills, something he admits in one episode only after becoming intoxicated. Omundson describes his character's animosity towards Shawn as stemming from the fact that Lassiter has worked hard to climb the chain of command and become good at his job. While Lassiter is rarely seen solving cases, he has an excellent record for "normal" casework, having closed or solved hundreds of routine cases ranging from petty theft to murder. His approach favors simple explanations and he tends to draw obvious conclusions, in sharp contrast to Shawn's theatrics and frequently convoluted explanations. On-screen, he is frequently frustrated in his cases by Shawn's parallel investigations, generally because he must confirm or debunk all of Shawn's psychic 'leads' even when they are wrong. He is also unaware that Shawn frequently conceals or withholds crucial evidence to conduct his own work, usually revealing the deception after the evidence is no longer necessary or it identifies the true perpetrator. By comparison, Lassiter prefers a straightforward investigative approach to form a single accusation and arrest; however, once he has formed his conclusion he can be rigid about changing his mind, especially if the suspect is a known criminal or has committed other illegal acts.

Overall, Lassiter is both proud to be a police officer and seemingly organizes his entire life around his job; in a humorous example, he is once shown in a 'casual' outfit that is identical to what he wears to work, just wearing different shoes. Lassiter prides himself on his sternness and professionalism but is frequently shocked to discover that his peers, colleagues, and (occasionally) suspects do not hold him in equally high regard. In "Extradition: British Columbia," after successfully apprehending a master thief that he has spent years tracking down, the thief rebuffs Lassiter's gloating, commenting that he has no idea who Lassiter is. In contrast to Shawn's mercurial demeanor, Lassiter is remarkably consistent and stubborn, with none of these deflating instances nor Shawn's constant belittling ever impacting his ego for more than a few moments. In playful recognition of Lassiter's persistence, endearing loyalty, and dedication, Shawn frequently refers to him as, 'Lassie', intended to be both a jab at Lassiter's name and an affectionate comparison to the beloved icon -- which Lassiter openly hates.

Lassiter is a Republican, having punched Shawn in the face when he said that Ronald Reagan was a terrible president (after he refused when Shawn asked him to punch him because he was undercover). He also reveals this by referring to residents of a local commune as "flag burners." He has the theme song of the show Cops as his ringtone. He also hints at being a Republican when he says he believes that there is no room for interpretation in the Constitution and through his admiration of both Chuck Norris and the NRA. Lassiter has also mentioned that he believes climate change is a hoax. Additionally, in the seventh season episode "Deez Nups", he refers to having been busy "opposing the healthcare law at the grassroots level," presumably a reference to the Affordable Care Act that had recently been implemented despite considerable opposition from the Republican Party.

Lassiter is very protective of his partner, Juliet O'Hara, and sees her as a little sister. When Shawn expresses interest in dating her, Lassiter issues a stern warning to Shawn, reciting Shawn's long list of failed relationships and cavalier attitude towards women in general, followed by promising during a polygraph examination to shoot Shawn "many times" if he emotionally hurts O'Hara. Even so, Omundson notes that Lassiter's appreciation for his rivalry with Shawn and Gus outweighs their interference and his misgivings stating, "I think, secretly, he doesn't mind them too much because it always gives him a nice challenge."
