= Pilot (Psych) =

- Psych episode
- Malcolm Orso, after being shot by Mr. McCallum. Co-executive producer Chris Henze considered the murder to be one of the most gruesome scenes in the show's history.
- Episode no.: Season 1 Episode 1
- Directed by: Michael Engler
- Written by: Steve Franks
- Production code: 1001
- Original air date: July 7, 2006
- Running time: 66 minutes (broadcast version); 78 minutes (extended version)

Guest appearances
- Kirsten Nelson as Chief Karen Vick; Josh Hayden as Young Shawn Spencer; Don S. Davis as Mr. McCallum; Pascale Hutton as Katarina McCallum; P. Lynn Johnson as Mrs. McCallum; Jason Bryden as Camden McCallum; Robert Parent as Malcolm Orso; Sage Brocklebank as Buzz McNab; Patricia Idlette as Officer Allen

Episode chronology
| ← Previous — | Next → "Spellingg Bee" |
- Psych season 1

"Pilot" is the first episode of the TV series, Psych. It originally aired on USA Network on July 7, 2006.

== Plot ==
Shawn Spencer (James Roday) has never kept a job for more than six months. He helps the Santa Barbara Police Department prove a man guilty; while watching a news program he used his keen powers of observation and his near perfect photographic memory to determine who committed the crime. The information was so good the cops believe he may have been involved. Detectives Carlton Lassiter (Timothy Omundson) and Lucinda Barry (Anne Dudek) take Shawn into questioning, where Shawn claims to have obtained the information psychically. The police let him go with no proof to disprove the claim. On his way out, Shawn is asked for help by Chief Karen Vick on a high-profile kidnapping case. The investigation into the kidnapping of Camden McCallum, sole male heir to the McCallum fortune, is stalled. She believes Shawn's psychic powers can help solve the case. Shawn takes advantage of this, realizing a new career has just fallen into his lap.

He visits his childhood friend Burton "Gus" Guster (Dulé Hill), a pharmaceutical representative, and asks for his help. Gus is reluctant, but eventually gets involved with the McCallum case. Shawn and Gus find out that about 18 months before, Camden had straightened up his usual party boy act. They learn Camden never did anything without his dog, and he disappeared from a park along with the dog. Shawn realizes Camden was not kidnapped but disappeared. Exactly 18 months before, Mr. McCallum threatened to cut Camden out of the inheritance if he didn't straighten up. Camden also stopped hanging around with his close friend, Malcolm Orso. Camden and Malcolm were planning a ransom.

Shawn and Gus check out Orso's cabin, where they find Camden's "missing" dog. Shawn goes back to the cops to convince them he had a psychic vision of Orso's cabin. The police go inside the cabin and find both Camden and Orso dead in an apparent suicide murder situation. Shawn takes a quick look at the room, and he is not convinced. Especially because Mr. McCallum had a cut on his wrist that could be a dog bite. Shawn visits his estranged father, Henry (Corbin Bernsen). Henry says Shawn's powers are getting soft and he's trusting people he shouldn't be. Shawn then suspects Camden's sister, Katarina.

Katarina wasn't involved, but her bag was. At one time it had to have carried the money. One of the McCallums tried to pay the ransom, but something must have gone wrong. Shawn and Gus confirm that it was Mr. McCallum that tried to make the ransom. McCallum saw Camden inside Orso's cabin. During the ensuing argument, Camden fell, hit his head, and bled to death. McCallum has no choice but to shoot Orso to cover his tracks and make it look like Orso murdered Camden then committed suicide. On his way out, McCallum was bitten by Camden's angry dog. Shawn proves himself to the police by explaining and proving a "vision" of dog bite medication in McCallum's medicine cabinet that Gus actually saw when he was going to the bathroom. McCallum is arrested. Shawn and Gus have solved their first case and open their own private detective agency, Psych.

== Production ==
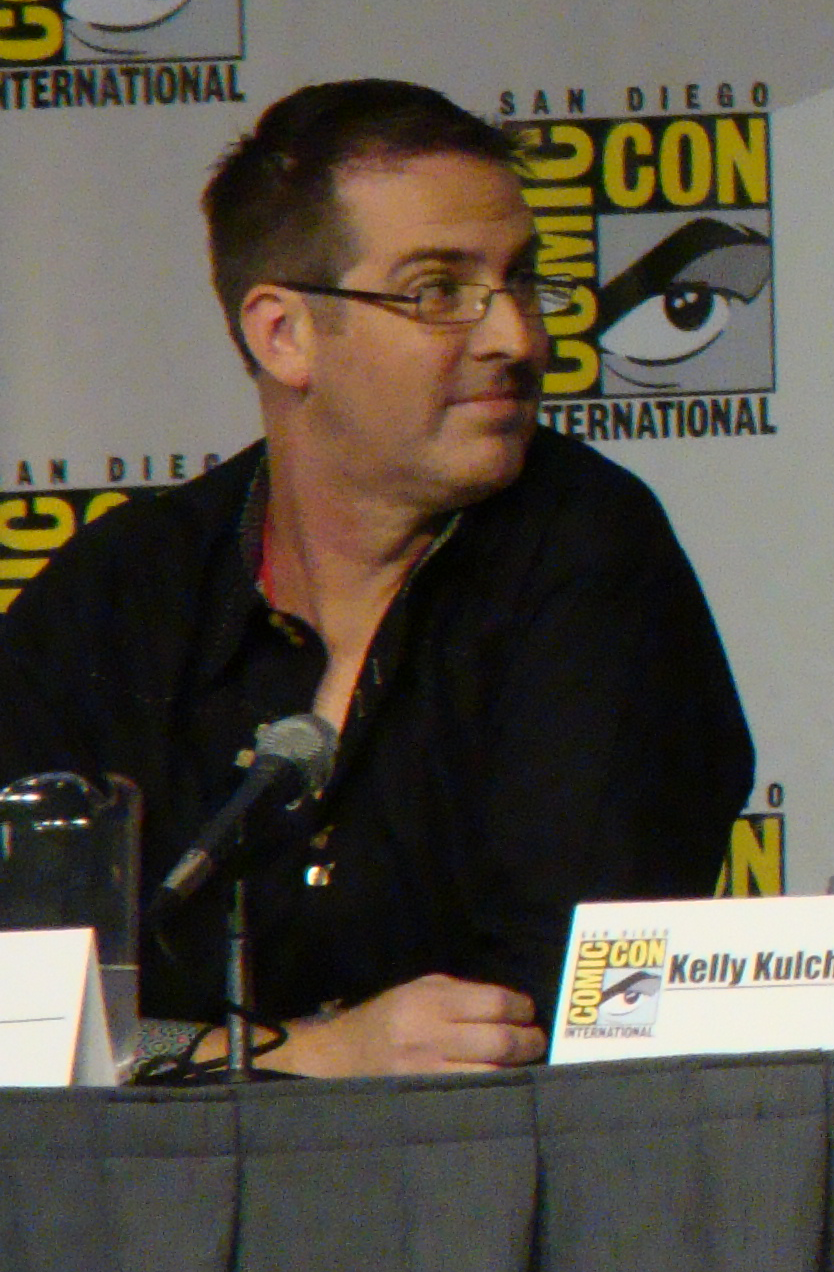
Steve Franks originally created Psych after his pitch for the film Big Daddy

=== Conception and development ===
After successfully pitching the film Big Daddy to the production company Columbia Pictures, the film's writer, Steve Franks was requested by Columbia to pitch them ideas for five new television programs. Among the ideas Franks pitched was the original outline for Psych. Columbia Pictures felt that the idea for the show was completely ridiculous, so Franks forgot about it. A few years afterwards, Steve Franks met with producer Kelly Kulchak, asking her to help him with creating a one-hour-long TV series. Kulchak agreed, and Franks presented the original idea he had for Psych, which Kulchak considered to be brilliant.

Franks and Kulchak pitched the idea to numerous TV networks, including the "Big Three". Kulchak stated that "it was a great pitch and that everybody laughed, but no one wanted to buy it". Kulchak attributed this due to the show's comedy–drama format, which was virtually unused at the time. The show's producers stated that Psych's comedy drama format is based on the former TV series' Moonlighting and Remington Steele, of which creator Steve Franks was a longtime fan. The final network Franks and Kulchak pitched the show to was USA Network. The network loved the concept, and decided to produce the show. However, the network brought in other writers to help with the show, which Steve Franks was unhappy about, as he originally intended to make the show entirely himself.

USA Network first announced their potential broadcasting of Psych on June 17, 2005. The network stated that they had requested a pilot episode of the series, to be managed by Tagline Productions. The original working name for the series was "Psyche". By August 30, James Roday and Dulé Hill had been cast to play the show's main characters. It was also announced that the production for the show's pilot episode would begin shortly, and the episode would likely air in 2006. On January 5, 2006, USA announced the Psyche would be competing against In Plain Sight, written by David Maples, and Underfunded, written by David Breckman, for air time and broadcasting slots. Later in January, the network confirmed that the pilot episode for the show would air later that year. They also announced that the show's name had changed to Psych. On February 21, 2006, USA Network announced that it had ordered eleven one-hour episode scripts for Psych. They confirmed that the show would take Monk's 10 p.m. (EST) Friday night time slot, and that the pilot episode, planned to be two hours in length, would be broadcast on July 7. The network also revealed that Corbin Bernsen had been cast as another of the show's major characters. The network released, on April 27, that filming for the pilot episode, which had been cut to 90 minutes in length, had begun in Vancouver, British Columbia. In addition, USA Network announced that Timothy Omundson and Kirsten Nelson would have starring roles in the episode. The original extended version of the episode would be released internationally and is currently available on Netflix.

=== Writing ===
The episode was written by Steve Franks, who reused much material from the original pitch to USA Network. The pitch focused on a man who would call in crime-solving tips to the Santa Barbara Police Department through his photographic memory and uncanny ability to notice details. It followed him as he was arrested by the police, talked his way out of jail, and solved a crime for the police department. The plot of the show was later changed to Shawn's fake psychic ability by the producers. The show's introductory flashback to young Shawn was adapted from the pitch, in which it was located in the middle of the installment. The use of an introductory flashback has been used in almost all following episodes. Among other scenes added to the episode was a confrontation between Shawn and Henry at a barbecue restaurant, which was added by Corbin Bernsen, and the episode's conclusion, again a confrontation between Shawn and Henry. In addition, much time was spent revising the scene of the arrest of Mr. McCallum.

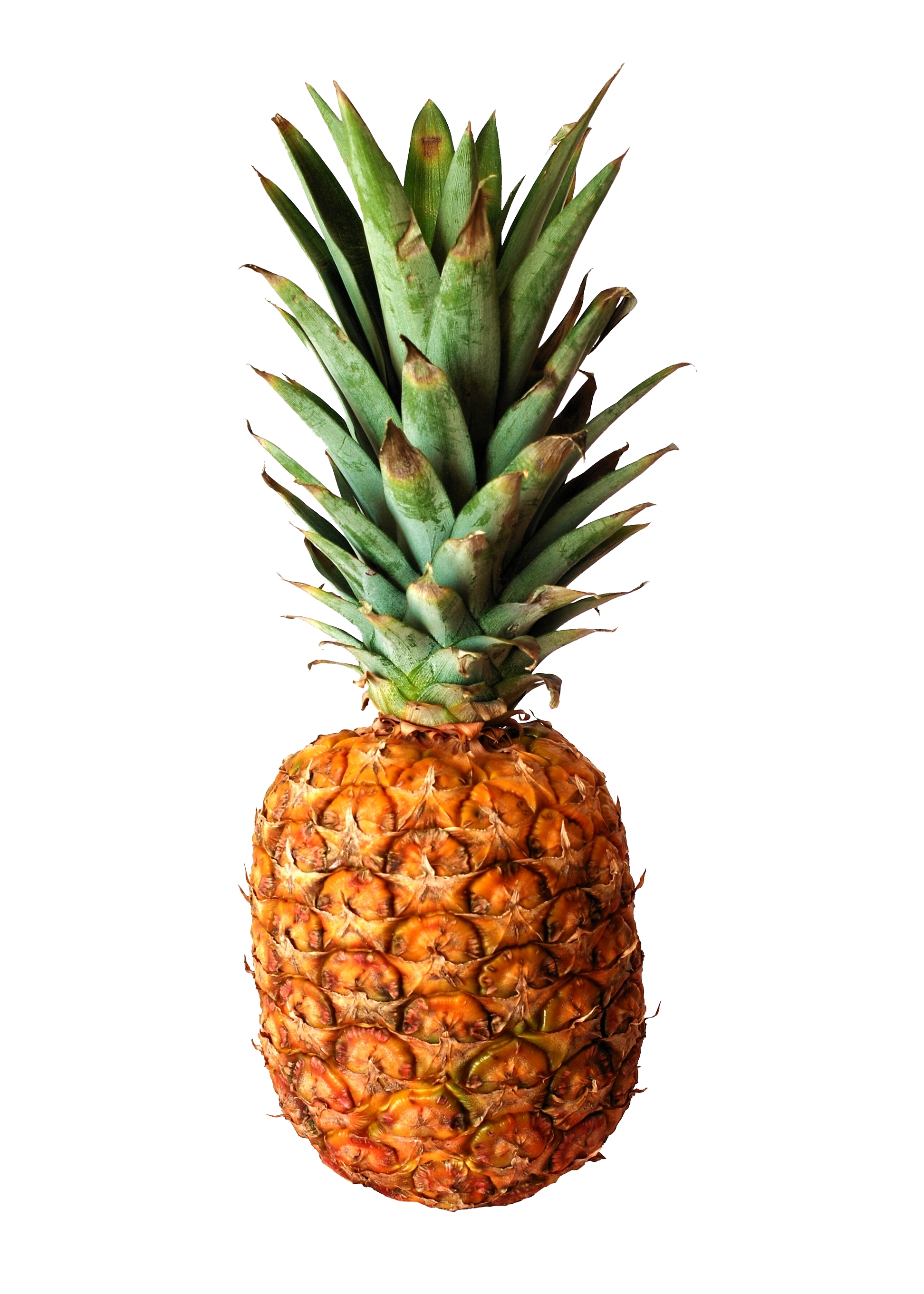
The inclusion of a pineapple in nearly every episode of the series began with an improvisation by James Roday

Large portions of the installment's dialogue were improvisations made by James Roday. Several of Roday's improvisations have become reoccurring themes on the show; Shawn's unusual and spasmodic "psychic episodes" were added by Roday, and was kept by the producers, who loved the idea. Another major theme that was created through Roday's improvising was the inclusion of food in every episode. This was established when Roday ate pretzels while talking to Gus for the first time in the episode. Also, the inclusion of a pineapple in nearly every episode was established through an improvised scene during the pilot. In addition, large amounts of dialogue were removed in favor of using visual elements and facial expressions.

Several scenes were deleted from the episode, generally because the producers felt they were not necessary. A short scene about Chief Vick's pregnancy was removed from the instalment because it was deemed to be irrelevant to the episode's plot. Mention of the chief's pregnancy was not made until it was time for her to give birth. A scene about Shawn hooking up with Katarina and then gathering evidence from her was removed from the episode, as well as several smaller scenes.

The pilot is the only episode to feature Anne Dudek as Lucinda Barry, Lassiter's original partner and love interest. As test audiences did not recognize Lassiter was separated from his wife, his relationship with Barry caused negative reception to the character. Barry was subsequently written out of the series, while the character Juliet O'Hara (Maggie Lawson) was created to replace her.

=== Filming ===
Steve Franks and his wife, April, went to Santa Barbara on their honeymoon. At the time, he was developing the idea for Psych. He knew he didn't want a big city atmosphere. He wanted a place that was beautiful.

— Mel Damski, speaking on the decision for the filming location for Psych.

Creator Steve Franks wanted to set Psych in a city that reflected the show's personality. Franks knew that he did not want the show to be set in a big city atmosphere. While developing Psych, Franks visited Santa Barbara while on his honeymoon. He felt that Santa Barbara was the perfect place to set the show, but that they would be unable to film the show there. Executive producer Mel Damski commented the filming of the show, that "We wanted to set and film it in Santa Barbara, but the area doesn't really have enough crewmembers". After the show was approved, Franks began looking for places to film, settling for Vancouver, British Columbia. He felt that Vancouver was "the next best location" to Santa Barbara.

Although Franks chose to film the show in Vancouver, most of the show is filmed in the surrounding communities. Approximately 40% of the pilot was filmed in the Vancouver suburb of White Rock, including most scenes focusing on coastal areas. Several other scenes were filmed in regional mountains. The entire episode was filmed in real-life locations, instead of the sets used for every episode since. The show had to use real locations due to uncertainty on whether the show would succeed. Not being able to use a stage for filming created several issues in the episode.

The installment's opening flashback was filmed at a Vancouver diner. The small dimensions of the diner forced the filming crew to alter the angle of the scene. The entire episode was filmed during November and December, and cold temperatures affected filming. Producers commented on how the temperature was usually between 1°C and 4 °C (33.8°F–39.2 °F). Most scenes involving the Santa Barbara police department were filmed in a working youth hostel, HI Vancouver Jericho Beach, which was earlier used as an army barracks. However, one scene was filmed in a "haunted" insane asylum, which later inspired the first-season finale "Scary Sherry: Bianca's Toast". Rain also tampered with filming of the episode. Several outdoor scenes in the episode were filmed in heavy rain, and forced the crew to use tarps and additional sound equipment.

Due to environmental differences between Santa Barbara and Vancouver, the crew had to use several different props to make the installment seem believable. The producers brought in fake palm trees, surfboards, and Southern California newspapers in order to make White Rock seem like Santa Barbara. Producers commented on how they made many mistakes in writing the episode. Steve Franks acknowledged that "within the first 6 seconds of the show, we made a mistake". The installment's murder scene was considered by the producers to be "the most gruesome thing we've ever done on the show".

== Reception ==
IGN gave the episode a favorable review, saying that although the 90-minute episode "drags on a bit longer than it needs to" it "certainly has the makings of a fun and diverting series." Richard Keller of TVSquad.com had a few issues with the first episodes such as the location and the underutilization of Dule Hill, other than that he stated that the show's concept "works well; even better than Monk in many respects". On the other hand, People's Tom Gliatto declared "Unlike Monk, a gently comic character coping with mental illness, Roday's just an overgrown kid. Who needs him?"
