= Juliet O'Hara =

- Psych character
- Maggie Lawson as Juliet O'Hara.
- First appearance: "Spellingg Bee" (Psych; 2006)
- Created by: Steve Franks
- Portrayed by: Maggie Lawson

In-universe information
- Aliases: Mary Lou Baumgartner (1.15), Maniac (3.07), Helene (7.02)
- Nicknames: Jules (by Shawn); Jewel (by her father); Mrs. Tostig; Maniac; Crazy Cat Lady
- Species: Human
- Gender: Female
- Occupation: San Francisco Police Department Head Detective (2014–present); SBPD Junior Detective (2006–14); Miami Police Department Police Officer (?–2006)
- Family: Frank O'Hara (father); Maryanne O'Hara (mother); Lloyd French (stepfather); Ewan O'Hara (brother); Unnamed brother
- Spouse: Shawn Spencer
- Significant others: Scott Seaver (1999–2003); Cameron Luntz (formerly); Declan Rand (2010)
- Relatives: Unnamed sister-in-law; Drake O'Hara (nephew); Finn O'Hara (nephew); Isaac O'Hara (nephew)

Head Detective Juliet Lynn "Jules" O'Hara is a character on the American comedy Psych and the sequel film series of the same name played by Maggie Lawson. The character is noted in part for strong relationships with other characters, including Carlton Lassiter and Shawn Spencer, and as exemplifying the show's feminism and theme of trust.

== Fictional biography ==
Juliet O'Hara first appears undercover in the show's second episode, "Spellingg Bee", as a recently transferred junior detective from Miami Beach where she attended the University of Miami, replacing Lucinda Barry as Head Detective Carlton Lassiter's partner after Shawn discovered Carlton and Lucinda were having an affair during the first episode, "Pilot". Born in October 1981, she was raised in a family of brothers and is shown to be close with both her parents and her siblings. Although she is initially frustrated by her coworkers not taking her seriously enough due to her relatively young age, as the series progresses she is given more responsibility, being left in charge in the absence of Lassiter and then Interim Chief Karen Vick. She has grown more assertive with her partner, and actors Maggie Lawson and Timothy Omundson (who plays Lassiter) both suggest that a strange mutual respect has developed between them.

Juliet seems to present a gentle counterpoint to Lassiter's gruff, rigid style. She reminds her partner repeatedly to "be sensitive" with the media, the victims, and the witnesses of their cases. Unlike Lassiter, she is friendly with Shawn Spencer and more willing to work with him and Burton Guster. Lawson says that, although Juliet is bemused by Shawn at first, she has slowly gained respect for him and by the second season, Juliet reveals a "very friendly, comfortable relationship". By the end of the fifth season, Shawn and Juliet are romantically involved. By the middle of the sixth season, Shawn is ready for marriage. In Psych: The Movie, Shawn and Juliet are married.

Her older brother Ewan, played by John Cena, is an army soldier whom she had to arrest when he attempted to murder an actual killer to protect the army. Ewan was supposed to go to prison but his high level bosses made him vanish. Juliet claims Ewan was the reason she became a cop, that him joining the military gave her enough confidence to join the police force. Her estranged con artist father Frank O'Hara is played by William Shatner. She seems to be Scots Irish, with her family hailing from Inverness.

== Reception and analysis ==
=== Relationships ===
Patricia Brace describes O'Hara's friendship with Lassiter as one of utility and pleasure, describing their characters' dichotomy and dedication to their work that they ultimately enjoy doing. Reviewing the movie Psych 2: Lassie Come Home, Natalie Zutter surmises that Juliet's character is used as a way for the show and actress Lawson to speak to actor Timothy Omundson and the audience in acknowledgement of the actor's stroke recovery.

Brace describes Juliet and Shawn's friendship as an Aristotelian "erotic friendship" that begins with bounds of a utilitarian friendship early on. Karen Romanko describes Juliet as being attracted to Shawn, noting the time it takes for them to "find romance", and the difficulties they go through after they do.

Amanda Lotz notes that Juliet's character occasionally functions to provide serial narrative via her relationship with Shawn, but that the series "willfully avoids ... relationship melodrama". Lotz also notes how Shawn's consideration of marriage to Juliet represents a complication for his relationship with Gus. In a review of the episode "Shawn Takes a Shot in the Dark," Jonah Krakow notes how Juliet and Shawn's potential romance was used to tease the audience, with Shawn making a phone call to Juliet, in a tense situation, faking a goodbye to his then girlfriend Abigail.

=== Trust ===
Romanko explains that Juliet tends to believe Shawn is psychic. On the philosophical question of whether to trust Shawn and generally how to evaluate testimony, Benjamin McCraw notes that Juliet's "trust hits a Goldilock's zone" between Officer McNab who always trusts and Lassiter who never trusts.

Cynthia Jones questions Juliet's trust in Shawn's psychic powers, asking why she doesn't notice when he examines clues or gets information from Gus. Jones suggests, "The most likely explanation ... is probably a combination of not wanting to believe he's lying, a set of background beliefs in the supernatural, working within a cultural climate in which people believe in psychic phenomena, and just plain old-fashioned ignoring of the evidence in front of her. She shouldn't believe he is psychic."

=== Feminism ===
Mona Rocha evaluates whether Psych is a sexist show, initially considering some of Shawn's interactions with Juliet. Rocha suggests that the main male characters all know or suspect Shawn is lying, but that Juliet and Chief Vick are left in an "inferior epistemic position". She then contrasts Psych with The Mentalist noting that in Psych, Shawn shows implicit trust in both O'Hara and Vick, embodying feminist values. Rocha concludes her initial concerns about Shawn's interaction with Juliet as not patriarchal or misogynistic. She goes on to describe the show's use of O'Hara's character for undercover work, and the reliance of Shawn, the main character, on Juliet explaining, "a healthy appreciation for the contributions women can make, clearly feminist in nature".
