= Patricia Idlette =

American actress

Patricia Ann Idlette (born 1950 or 1951) is an American actress known for her role as Kiffany in Showtime's Dead Like Me. She also appeared in four episodes of Battlestar Galactica as politician Sarah Porter, and as Melanie Blackstone in the miniseries Amerika. Idlette portrayed Katherine Jackson, mother of Michael Jackson, in the 2004 biopic Man in the Mirror: The Michael Jackson Story. She appeared as Brenda's mother in Scary Movie 3 in 2003.

== Early years ==
Originally from Miami, Florida, (another source says, "A native of Fort Myers who has lived in Miami during a part of her growing-up years".) she trained as an actress in Florida and Michigan (attending Florida State University and the University of Michigan). When Idlette was a sophomore at Miami Dade College, she won first place in oral interpretation of poetry and prose in the Florida State Speech Tournament, outdoing competition that included college seniors and graduate students.

== Career ==
She moved to Canada to join the repertory company of the Stratford Festival, acting in productions of A Midsummer Night's Dream, Antony and Cleopatra, The Winter's Tale, The Merchant of Venice, As You Like It and Medea. She remained based in Canada for many years, acting on stage in Toronto and Vancouver and appearing as a guest actor in television series such as Street Legal, The Littlest Hobo, Adderly, Katts and Dog and The X-Files.

She garnered a Dora Mavor Moore Award nomination for Best Performance by a Female in a Featured Role for her performance in Susan G. Cole's play A Fertile Imagination.

She moved back to Florida in the early 2000s.

== Filmography ==
=== Film ===
| Year | Title | Role | Notes |
|---|---|---|---|
| 1982 | Shocktrauma | Nurse Malcolm | Television film |
| 1983 | Between Friends | | Television film |
| 1984 | Heavenly Bodies | KC | |
| 1986 | Reckless Disregard | Receptionist | Television film |
| 1987 | Hands of a Stranger | Last Rape Victim | Television film |
| 1988 | Hostage | Cell Mate | Television film |
| 1989 | The Dream Team | Woman at Police Station | |
| 1991 | Drop Dead Gorgeous | Newscaster | Television film |
| 1992 | Last Wish | Hospital Nurse | Television film |
| 1992 | Black Death | Gayle | Television film |
| 1992 | Survivors | Karen Walker | Television film |
| 1994 | Out of Darkness | Policewoman | Television film |
| 1994 | Children of the Dark | Checkout Person | Television film |
| 1996 | Toe Tags | | Television film |
| 1997 | Breaking the Surface: The Greg Louganis Story | Social Worker | Television film |
| 1998 | Floating Away | Hooker | Television film |
| 2000 | Sole Survivor | Mahalia | Television film |
| 2000 | Frankie & Hazel | Teacher | Television film |
| 2000 | Holiday Heart | Mrs. Walker | Television film |
| 2000 | Air Bud 3 | Mrs. Brimstone | Direct-to-video |
| 2001 | Class Warfare | Lottery Attendant | Television film |
| 2002 | The Secret Life of Zoey | Cora | Television film |
| 2003 | The Delicate Art of Parking | Female Doctor | |
| 2003 | Scary Movie 3 | Mrs. Meeks | |
| 2004 | The Goodbye Girl | Improv Troupe | Television film |
| 2004 | The Perfect Score | Receptionist | |
| 2004 | Ginger Snaps 2: Unleashed | Dr. Brookner | |
| 2004 | Meltdown | 911 Operator | Television film |
| 2004 | Man in the Mirror: The Michael Jackson Story | Kat | Television film |
| 2004 | Deadly Visions | Jasmine | Television film |
| 2005 | Bad Girls from Valley High | Woman in Dressing Room | |
| 2005 | Amber Frey: Witness for the Prosecution | Dispatch Officer #2 | Television film |
| 2006 | The Ron Clark Story | Devina | Television film |
| 2006 | A Little Thing Called Murder | Female inmate | Television film |
| 2006 | She's The Man | Science Teacher | |
| 2006 | Past Tense | Dr. Wagner | Television film |
| 2006 | Tempbot | | Short film |
| 2008 | Chaos Theory | Nurse | |

=== Television ===
| Year | Title | Role | Notes |
|---|---|---|---|
| 1980 | The Littlest Hobo | Beth McLean | Episode: "Licence to Steal" |
| 1985 | Comedy Factory | Mavis | Episode: "Harry and the Kids" |
| 1986–1987 | Adderly | Reporter, Yvonne | 3 episodes |
| 1987 | Walt Disney's Wonderful World of Colors | Josie | Episode: "The Liberators" |
| 1987 | Amerika | Melanie Blackstone | 4 episodes |
| 1987 | Alfred Hitchcock Presents | Woman | Episode: "The Specialty of the House" |
| 1988–1989 | Street Legal | Crown, Hilary Geisler | 2 episodes |
| 1988 | The Twilight Zone | Susan | Episode: "Our Selena Is Dying" |
| 1988 | Katts and Dog | Deannie Bennet | Episode: "Kids Just Want to Have Fun" |
| 1992 | Top Cops | Elderly Lady | Episode: "John Kosek/Richard Voorhees/Doug Edgington/David Miles" |
| 1992 | Murder, She Wrote | Desk Person | Episode: "Sugar & Spice, Malice & Vice" |
| 1993 | NYPD Blue | Civilian Assistant | Episode: "The Confessions" |
| 1993 | South of Sunset | Martha | Episode: "Newspaper Boy" |
| 1997 | The Sentinel | Mrs. Russo | Episodes: "Private Eyes" |
| 1997 | The X-Files | Desk Clerk | Episode: "Synchrony" |
| 2000–2001 | Seven Days | Vonnie, Jasmine | 2 episodes |
| 2000 | The Outer Limits | Waitress | Episode: "The Grid" |
| 2000 | Freedom | | Episode: "The Chase" |
| 2002–2003 | John Doe | Bureaucracy, No-nonsense Officer | 2 episodes |
| 2002 | ¡Mucha Lucha! | (voice) | Episode: "The Curse of the Masked Toilet/The Mummy with the Golden Mask" |
| 2003 | The Dead Zone | Nurse Park | Episode: "Precipitate" |
| 2003–2004 | Dead Like Me | Kiffany | 21 episodes |
| 2004 | Andromeda | Council Member #1 | 2 episodes |
| 2005–2006 | Battlestar Galactica | Sarah Porter | 4 episodes |
| 2005 | Terminal City | Louise | Episode: "Episode #1.6" |
| 2006 | The L Word | Technician | Episode: "Lobsters" |
| 2006 | Psych | Desk Sergeant Martha Allen | 2 episodes |
