= Liam James =

Canadian actor

- Born: Vancouver, British Columbia, Canada
- Occupation: Actor
- Years active: 2006–present

Liam James is a Canadian actor. He is best known for his roles in 2012 (2009) and The Way, Way Back (2013). He has also had leading roles in various television shows including AMC's The Killing and ABC's The Family. From Vancouver, British Columbia, James has heterochromia iridum with one green and one blue eye.

== Filmography ==
=== Film ===
Year	Title	Role	Notes
2007	Good Luck Chuck	Boy in Penguin Habitat	
2007	Things We Lost in the Fire	Cousin David	
2007	Fred Claus	Fred Claus (age 12)	
2007	Aliens vs. Predator: Requiem	Sam Benson	
2009	Horsemen	Sean Breslin	
2009	2012	Noah Curtis	
2011	Christmas Comes Home to Canaan	Bobber Burtion	
2013	The Way, Way Back	Duncan	
2017	Speech & Debate	Solomon	

=== Television ===
Year	Title	Role	Notes
2006–2010	Psych	Young Shawn Spencer	Recurring role, 60 episodes
2008	Fear Itself	Young Harry	Episode: "Spooked"
2010	Fringe	Teddy Falls	Episode: "Johari Window"
2011–2013	The Haunting Hour: The Series	Scott and Jared	Episodes: "Pumpkinhead", and "Uncle Howee"
2011–2014	The Killing	Jack Linden	Recurring role (season 1); Main role (Season 2, 4); Guest (season 3); 22 episodes
2016	The Family	Adam Warren / Ben Murphy	Main role, 12 episodes
2018–2019	Deadly Class	Billy	Main role
2023	White House Plumbers	Saint John Hunt	HBO limited series

== Awards and nominations ==
Year	Award	Category	Nominated work	Result	Ref.
2013	Washington D.C. Area Film Critics Association	Best Youth Performance	The Way, Way Back	Nominated	
2013	Young Hollywood Award	Breakthrough Performance - Male	The Way, Way Back	Won	
2014	Critics' Choice Movie Award	Best Young Actor/Actress	The Way, Way Back	Nominated	
2014	MTV Movie Award	Best Breakthrough Performance	The Way, Way Back	Nominated	
2014	Young Artist Award	Best Leading Young Actor in a Feature Film	The Way, Way Back	Nominated	
