= Psych =

2006 American detective comedy-drama television series

- Genre: Detective fiction; Police procedural; Comedy drama
- Created by: Steve Franks
- Showrunner: Steve Franks
- Starring: James Roday; Dulé Hill; Timothy Omundson; Maggie Lawson; Corbin Bernsen; Kirsten Nelson; Anne Dudek
- Theme music composer: Steve Franks
- Opening theme: "I Know You Know" by the Friendly Indians
- Ending theme: "I Know You Know" by the Friendly Indians
- Composers: Adam Cohen; John Robert Wood
- Country of origin: United States
- Original language: English
- No. of seasons: 8
- No. of episodes: 121 (list of episodes)

Production
- Executive producers: Steve Franks; Chris Henze; Kelly Kulchak; Mel Damski; Bill Callahan
- Producers: Andy Berman; Gordon Mark; James Roday; Dulé Hill; Tim Meltreger; Tracey Jeffrey
- Production locations: White Rock, British Columbia, Canada
- Cinematography: Michael McMurray; Scott Williams
- Camera setup: Single-camera
- Running time: 42 minutes
- Production companies: Pacific Mountain Productions; Tagline Television; Universal Media Studios (2006–2008) (Note: Credited as NBC Universal Television Studio (2006–2007).); Universal Cable Productions (2008–2014)

Original release
- Network: USA Network
- Release: July 7, 2006 – March 26, 2014

Related
- Psych: The Movie (2017); Psych 2: Lassie Come Home (2020); Psych 3: This Is Gus (2021)

Psych is an American detective comedy-drama television series created by Steve Franks for USA Network. The series stars James Roday as Shawn Spencer, a young crime consultant for the Santa Barbara Police Department whose "heightened observational skills" and impressive eidetic memory allow him to convince people that he solves cases with his psychic abilities. The program also stars Dulé Hill as Shawn's intelligent best friend and reluctant partner Burton "Gus" Guster, as well as Corbin Bernsen as Shawn's father Henry, a former detective with the Santa Barbara Police Department.

Psych premiered on July 7, 2006, following the fifth season premiere of Monk, and continued to be paired with the series until Monk's conclusion on December 4, 2009. During the second season, an animated segment titled "The Big Adventures of Little Shawn and Gus" was added to the series. Psych was the highest-rated American basic cable television premiere of 2006. USA Network renewed the series for an eighth season on December 19, 2012, to include eight episodes, and ordered two more episodes on June 25, 2013, bringing the episode order to ten. On February 5, 2014, USA Network confirmed that the eighth season of Psych would be its last, with the series finale airing on March 26, 2014.

Psych: The Movie, a two-hour television film, aired on USA Network on December 7, 2017, launching the Psych film series, with Franks's hope being to make five more Psych movies following Psych: The Movie. On February 14, 2019, it was announced Psych: The Movie 2 was greenlit and set to premiere in late 2019, for which the main cast would return, but the premiere thereof was subsequently delayed to 2020, with the film renamed Psych 2: Lassie Come Home, and released on NBCUniversal's streaming service, Peacock, July 15, 2020, the day the service officially launched. On May 13, 2021, Peacock announced a third film, Psych 3: This Is Gus, which premiered on November 18, 2021. Three further Psych films are reportedly in development.

== Overview ==
Most episodes in the earlier seasons begin with a cold open in the form of a flashback to Shawn and Gus's childhoods. The flashbacks usually involve Shawn and Gus being taught a life lesson by Shawn's father, Henry Spencer (Corbin Bernsen), who wishes that his son would follow in his footsteps and become a law enforcement officer. These lessons often play a role for the climax of the episode. As a child, Shawn was taught by Henry to hone his powers of observation and deduction, often using games and challenges to test him. Each flashback also sets the theme for the episode.

Shawn originally becomes known as a psychic when, after calling in tips on dozens of crimes covered on the news which help the police to close the case, the police become suspicious of his knowledge, theorizing that such knowledge could only come from the "inside" and unwilling to believe that it is merely Shawn having honed his observational skills. To avoid being sent to jail, Shawn uses those skills to convince the police that he is psychic; though the interim police chief Karen Vick warns Shawn that if his "powers" are fake, he will be prosecuted. With no choice but to keep up the act, and having proven himself an effective aid to the police in solving crimes, he establishes a psychic detective agency, Psych, and becomes an outside consultant to the police. Pretending to have psychic powers allows him to engage in strange and comic behaviour as he turns real clues into hunches and otherworldly visitations. He enjoys teasing lifelong friend Burton Guster (Gus), a pharmaceutical sales representative about Gus's eclectic interests as they drive around in a blue Toyota Echo nicknamed "The Blueberry" solving crimes.

Head Detective Carlton Lassiter (Timothy Omundson), playfully nicknamed "Lassie" by Shawn and Gus, quietly comes to respect Shawn's crime-solving skills despite doubting his psychic abilities; Lassiter is constantly exasperated by Shawn keeping investigations ongoing and/or infuriated by Shawn's antics. However, junior detective Juliet "Jules" O'Hara (Maggie Lawson) and Chief Karen Vick (Kirsten Nelson) are far less antagonistic – with O'Hara expressing belief in Shawn's abilities while Vick is mum on the subject – and usually willing to give Shawn the leeway he needs to solve cases. Henry and Shawn have a difficult relationship, but despite this, Henry reluctantly helps Shawn on various occasions.

The show is famous for its numerous recurring gags, which include Shawn's outlandish nicknames for Gus (Magic Head, Immaculate Conception, Gus T.T. Showbiz), the "hidden pineapple" in every episode of the show, and regularly featuring guest stars from the shows and movies being referenced in the plot; this includes nearly all of the main cast from the 1985 film The Breakfast Club (with the exception of Emilio Estevez).

== Characters ==
=== Main ===
The main cast of Psych (L–R): Maggie Lawson, Corbin Bernsen, James Roday, Kirsten Nelson, Dulé Hill, and Timothy Omundson.

- Shawn Spencer (James Roday) is a freelance consultant with the Santa Barbara Police Department who pretends to be a psychic.
- Burton "Gus" Guster (Dulé Hill) is Shawn's best friend and business partner.
- Carlton "Lassie" Lassiter (Timothy Omundson) is the head detective for the Santa Barbara Police Department.
- Juliet "Jules" O'Hara (Maggie Lawson) is a junior detective for the Santa Barbara Police Department partnered with Lassiter.
- Henry Spencer (Corbin Bernsen) is Shawn's uptight and precise father and a former police sergeant.
- Karen Vick (Kirsten Nelson) is the SBPD Interim Chief and is later named Chief in "Shawn (and Gus) of the Dead" (main seasons 2–8, recurring season 1).
- Lucinda Barry (Anne Dudek) (Note: In the pilot episode Dudek was billed fourth in the credits.) is Lassiter's original partner and love interest in the pilot. She is transferred after Shawn tips off her relationship with Lassiter to the Santa Barbara Police Department (season 1).

=== Recurring ===
- Young Shawn (seasons 1–5: Liam James; seasons 5–6: Skyler Gisondo) is the younger version of Shawn Spencer.
- Young Gus (Carlos McCullers II) is the younger version of Burton "Gus" Guster.
- Buzz McNab (Sage Brocklebank) is a naïve but lovable cop who often provides Shawn and Gus with clues.
- Madeleine Spencer (Cybill Shepherd) is a police psychologist who is Shawn's mother and Henry's ex-wife.
- Abigail Lytar (Rachael Leigh Cook) is Shawn's high-school crush, later his girlfriend.
- Winnie Guster (Phylicia Rashad) is Gus's mother.
- Bill Guster (season 2: Ernie Hudson; season 3: Keith David) is Gus's father.
- Mr. Yang (Ally Sheedy) is a serial killer.
- Mary Lightly (Jimmi Simpson) is a department psychologist who is an expert on Mr. Yang.
- Woody the Coroner (Kurt Fuller) is a police coroner with whom Shawn shares a mutual respect.
- Pierre Despereaux (Cary Elwes) is an extremely elusive international art thief.
- Declan Rand (Nestor Carbonell) is a rich criminal profiler.
- Marlowe Viccellio (Kristy Swanson) is a woman Lassiter meets and later marries.
- Curt Smith (himself) is the singer of the band Tears for Fears.
- Frank O'Hara (William Shatner) is Juliet's estranged father.
- Rachael (Parminder Nagra) is Gus's girlfriend.
- Lloyd French (Jeffrey Tambor) is Juliet's stepfather.
- Harris Trout (Anthony Michael Hall) is a special consultant hired by the mayor to increase efficiency at the SBPD.
- Betsy Brannigan (Mira Sorvino) takes over as the new Head Detective when Lassiter is promoted to Chief.
- Father Wesley (Ray Wise) is a Catholic priest and a friend of Shawn and Gus.

== Episodes ==
Season	Episodes	Originally released		
Season	Episodes	First released	Last released	Network
1	15	July 7, 2006	March 2, 2007	USA
2	16	July 13, 2007	February 15, 2008	USA
3	16	July 18, 2008	February 20, 2009	USA
4	16	August 7, 2009	March 10, 2010	USA
5	16	July 14, 2010	December 22, 2010	USA
6	16	October 12, 2011	April 11, 2012	USA
7	14	February 27, 2013	May 29, 2013	USA
Psych: The Musical		December 15, 2013		USA
8	10	January 8, 2014	March 26, 2014	USA
Psych: The Movie		December 7, 2017		USA
Psych 2: Lassie Come Home		July 15, 2020		Peacock
Psych 3: This Is Gus		November 18, 2021		Peacock

== Production ==
The show uses White Rock, British Columbia, Canada for its Santa Barbara, California setting.

=== Casting ===
USA offered the role of Shawn Spencer to Matthew Perry, seeking a big name for the production. However, creator Steve Franks wanted James Roday, and eventually he was cast.

Anne Dudek's character was written out of the series after the character generated a negative test audience reaction with Lassiter due to their relationship. Maggie Lawson was cast as Juliet O'Hara to serve as a replacement.

=== Theme song ===
The theme song for Psych is "I Know You Know" by the Friendly Indians, series creator Steve Franks's band. Some episodes in the third through eighth seasons use an extended version of "I Know You Know" consisting of the first verse and the chorus, though most episodes use a shortened version consisting of mostly the chorus. In some episodes, the theme song is changed, usually as a tie-in to the theme of the episode to come.

Variations of the theme song include:

- A Christmas-themed version in the Christmas episodes, "Gus's Dad May Have Killed an Old Guy" (2x10), "Christmas Joy" (3x09), and "The Polarizing Express" (5x14)
- A Spanish-sung version in "Lights, Camera... Homicidio" (2x13) and "No Country for Two Old Men" (7x04)
- A Bollywood-themed version sung in Hindi for "Bollywood Homicide" (4x06)
- A cappella version performed by Boyz II Men in the episodes revolving around Gus's a cappella group, "High Top Fade-Out" (4x07) and "Let's Doo-Wop It Again" (6x13)
- A version recorded by Curt Smith for "Shawn 2.0" (5x08)
- A version sung by Julee Cruise in the Twin Peaks-inspired episode, "Dual Spires" (5x12)
- A superhero-themed version in "The Amazing Psych-Man & Tap-Man, Issue 2" (6x04)
- A The Shining-inspired version for "Heeeeere's Lassie" (6x11)

=== Pineapple ===
In the "pilot", Roday improvised by picking up a pineapple and saying, "Should I slice this up for the road?" Since then, pineapples have appeared in every episode as a running gag, whether just one in the background or the actual mention of it. It is Shawn's go-to housewarming gift. The pineapple is a major marketing point for items related to the show on the USA website. Fan movements, such as fan-made websites, have also been dedicated to finding a pineapple or pineapple-related object in each episode.

=== Series finale aftershow ===
Following the series finale on March 26, 2014, USA Network aired a live aftershow entitled "Psych After Pshow." The hour-long special was hosted by Kevin Pereira and featured series stars and creator/executive producer Steve Franks.

== Release ==
=== Syndication ===
In July 2011, Ion Television announced that Psych would become part of its 2012 broadcast in syndication. During 2012, reruns of the show mostly ran on Saturdays as a marathon. In 2013, Ion Television announced the acquisition option pick-up of season seven of Psych. It no longer airs on Ion Television. The deal with NBC Universal Cable & New Media Distribution adds all 16 new episodes of season seven to Ion's existing library of seasons one to six of Psych and includes rights to future seasons. In January 2023, Psych started airing on Hallmark Movies & Mysteries. The show also aired on its sister channel, Hallmark Channel, starting in January 2025. The Hallmark airings contain edited dialogue and scenes to align with the channel's content guidelines. As of January 2026, the show currently airs on Great Entertainment Television.

=== Home media ===
Title	Ep #	Region 1	Region 2	Region 4
The Complete First Season	15	June 26, 2007	April 24, 2008	April 30, 2008
The Complete Second Season	16	July 8, 2008	June 7, 2010	March 3, 2010
The Complete Third Season	16	July 21, 2009	February 21, 2011	March 2, 2011
The Complete Fourth Season	16	July 13, 2010	July 18, 2011	August 22, 2012
The Complete Fifth Season	16	May 31, 2011	May 21, 2012	September 5, 2013
The Psych-O-Ween Collection	4	September 11, 2012	TBA	TBA
The Complete Sixth Season	16	October 16, 2012	July 26, 2013	August 14, 2014
The Complete Seventh Season	14	October 8, 2013	July 11, 2016	TBA
Psych: The Musical	4	December 17, 2013	TBA	TBA
The Eighth and Final Season	10	April 1, 2014	TBA	TBA
The Complete Series	120	October 7, 2014	TBA	TBA
The Complete Collection	120, 1 Movie	July 3, 2018	TBA	TBA
The Complete Collection (Blu-ray version)	120, 3 Movies	October 17, 2023	TBA	TBA

== Reception ==
=== Ratings ===
Psych scored a 4.51 rating and an average of 6.1 million total viewers at its premiere, which made it the highest-rated scripted series premiere on basic cable in 2006 in all key demographics (households, P18–49, P25–54, and total viewers), according to a USA Network press release, quoted from the Futon Critic.

Season	Timeslot (ET)	Episodes	Premiered		Ended		TV season
Season	Timeslot (ET)	Episodes	Date	Premiere Viewers (in millions)	Date	Finale Viewers (in millions)	TV season
1	Friday 10:00 pm (July 7, 2006 – February 20, 2009)	15	July 7, 2006	6.06	March 2, 2007	4.48	2006–2007
2	Friday 10:00 pm (July 7, 2006 – February 20, 2009)	16	July 13, 2007	4.33	February 15, 2008	4.70	2007–2008
3	Friday 10:00 pm (July 7, 2006 – February 20, 2009)	16	July 18, 2008	4.89	February 20, 2009	4.83	2008–2009
4	Friday 10:00 pm (August 7, 2009 – October 16, 2009); Wednesday 10:00 pm (January 27, 2010 – March 10, 2010)	16	August 7, 2009	3.98	March 10, 2010	2.95	2009–2010
5	Wednesday 10:00 pm (July 14, 2010 – May 29, 2013) (Note: The episode "Psych: The Musical" aired as a special two-hour event at 9:00 pm Eastern on December 15, 2013, outside of the seventh season's primary run.)	16	July 14, 2010	3.69	December 22, 2010	2.90	2010
6	Wednesday 10:00 pm (July 14, 2010 – May 29, 2013)	16	October 12, 2011	3.00	April 11, 2012	2.71	2011–2012
7	Wednesday 10:00 pm (July 14, 2010 – May 29, 2013)	14	February 27, 2013	2.94	May 29, 2013	2.18	2013
8	Wednesday 9:00 pm (January 8, 2014 – March 26, 2014)	10	January 8, 2014	2.28	March 26, 2014	1.93	2014

Rotten Tomatoes gave the first three seasons of the series an overall 89% "fresh" rating.

=== Nominations and awards ===
Psych was the winner of the Center for Inquiry Annual Award for "Excellence in Entertainment" for advancing the cause of science and exposing superstition. Accepting for Psych was staff writer Daniel Hsia. James Roday Rodriguez was nominated for the 2006 Satellite Award for Best Actor – Television Series Musical or Comedy. Rodriguez was also nominated for the 2009 Ewwy Award for Best Actor in a Comedy. Psych was nominated for its first Emmy Award in 2010 in the category Primetime Emmy Award for Outstanding Music Composition for a Series (Original Dramatic Score) for the episode "Mr. Yin Presents...". Adam Cohen and John Robert Wood were the composers for this episode. Psych was nominated for its second Emmy Award in 2012 in the category "Primetime Emmy Award for Outstanding Emerging Media Program" for their interactive game "HashTag Killer". In 2012 and 2013, Psych was nominated for the People's Choice Award for "Best Cable TV Comedy". In 2014, Psych won the People's Choice Award for "Best Cable TV Comedy" in its last nomination.

== Other media ==
=== Novels ===
William Rabkin has written and published five novels based on the series. The novels are written in third-person narrative style. Additionally, Chad Gervich (Small Screen, Big Picture) has published a crime-fighting guide based on methods presented in the show.

Author	Title	ISBN	Publication date
William Rabkin	A Mind Is a Terrible Thing to Read	0-451-22635-6	January 6, 2009
William Rabkin	Mind Over Magic	0-451-22744-1	July 7, 2009
William Rabkin	The Call of the Mild	0-451-22876-6	January 5, 2010
William Rabkin	A Fatal Frame of Mind	0-451-23159-7	August 3, 2010
William Rabkin	Mind-Altering Murder	0-451-23252-6	February 1, 2011
Chad Gervich	Psych's Guide to Crime Fighting for the Totally Unqualified	1-455-51286-9	May 7, 2013

=== Film series ===
Once production on the original series wrapped, series creator Steve Franks had the idea to bring the Psych universe back in film form. On May 8, 2017, USA Network announced Psych: The Movie, a two-hour TV film to air December 7, 2017. All the original main cast returned for the film, directed by Franks and co-written by Franks and series star James Roday Rodriguez. The first sequel, Psych 2: Lassie Come Home, was released on NBCUniversal's new streaming service, Peacock, on July 15, 2020. A third film, Psych 3: This Is Gus, followed on November 18, 2021. Three further Psych films are in development with the script for Psych 4 reportedly complete.

=== Podcast ===
==== The Psychologists Are In: A Psych Rewatch ====
Launched in November 2021, Maggie Lawson and Timothy Omundson have hosted a weekly rewatch podcast of the series and films. Episodes include plot recaps and behind-the-scenes memories from the two hosts. The series also features interviews with cast members, guest stars, and crew members, including writers, directors, and series creator Steve Franks.
