= Mel Damski =

American film producer

- Born: Melvin Damski; July 21, 1946 (age 79); Manhattan, New York, U.S.
- Education: Colgate University (BA); American Film Institute (MFA)
- Occupations: Film director, television director, producer
- Years active: 1978-present

Melvin Damski (born July 21, 1946 in New York, New York) is an American director and producer of film and television.

== Life and career ==
Mel Damski (born in New York, New York) is an American film director and film producer. Damski has Northern European Jewish heritage, one of four children of German refugee parents. Damski grew up in Roslyn, Long Island, New York and attended Colgate University on a football scholarship. He was a reporter for Long Island Newsday before moving to Los Angeles to attend the AFI Conservatory in 1972.

Damski was the Producing-Director of Psych. In addition to his long directing career, including 29 movies and scores of episodes, he has taught film and television at NYU, USC and AFI. He is also President of Lyrique Wine Company, a small family owned winery.

In 1998, Damski, along with Andrea Blaugrund, was nominated for an Oscar for Best Short Documentary for the film Still Kicking: The Fabulous Palm Springs Follies.

In 1981, Damski was nominated for an Emmy Award for outstanding directing in a drama series for American Dream.

In 1979, Damski was nominated for an Emmy Award for outstanding directing in a drama series for the television series Lou Grant (1977) for the episode "Murder".

Damski's column "If I Ran The Zoo" runs every Wednesday in the La Conner Weekly News and a week later on his blog.

== Selected filmography ==
Film

- Yellowbeard (1983)
- Mischief (1985)
- Happy Together (1989)
- Still Kicking: The Fabulous Palm Springs Follies (1997)
- Legendary (2010)
- Coming Home for Christmas (2017)

Television

- Long Journey Back (1978)
- M*A*S*H, episode "Out of Gas" (1978)
- Lou Grant (1977-1978)
- A Perfect Match (1980)
- Word of Honor (1981)
- American Dream (1981)
- For Ladies Only (1981)
- Attack on Fear (1984)
- Badge of the Assassin (1985)
- The Three Kings (1987)
- Everybody's Baby: The Rescue of Jessica McClure (1989)
- A Connecticut Yankee in King Arthur's Court (1989)
- The Girl Who Came Between Them (1990)
- Blood River (1991)
- Class of '96 (1993)
- Picket Fences (1992-1993)
- Lois & Clark: The New Adventures of Superman (1994) (episode: "Witness")
- Harts of the West (1994) (episode: "Hart's Vacation")
- Chicago Hope (1994)
- American Gothic (1995)
- Nowhere Man (1996)
- Early Edition (1996)
- The Care and Handling of Roses (1996)
- Their Second Chance (1997)
- Pacific Palisades (1997)
- Vengeance Unlimited (1998)
- Love Boat: The Next Wave (1998-1999)
- Ally (1999)
- The Practice (1998-2000)
- Boston Public (2000)
- Titans (2000)
- The Clark Family (2001)
- Ally McBeal (1997-2001)
- The Tick (2002) (episode: "The Tick vs. Justice")
- The Guardian (2002)
- Everwood (2003)
- Without a Trace (2003)
- 1-800-Missing (2003)
- Judging Amy (2003)
- Darcy's Wild Life (2004-2006) (episodes: "Darcy's Wild Life", "Puppy Love" and "Swine Flew the Coop")
- Kevin Hill (2004)
- Point Pleasant (2005)
- Boston Legal (2004-2005)
- Charmed (1999-2006)
- Las Vegas (2006)
- Beautiful People (2006)
- The Wedding Bells (2007)
- Psych (2006-2014)
- Darrow & Darrow (2018, TV movies)
