= Steve Franks =

American television director, producer and writer

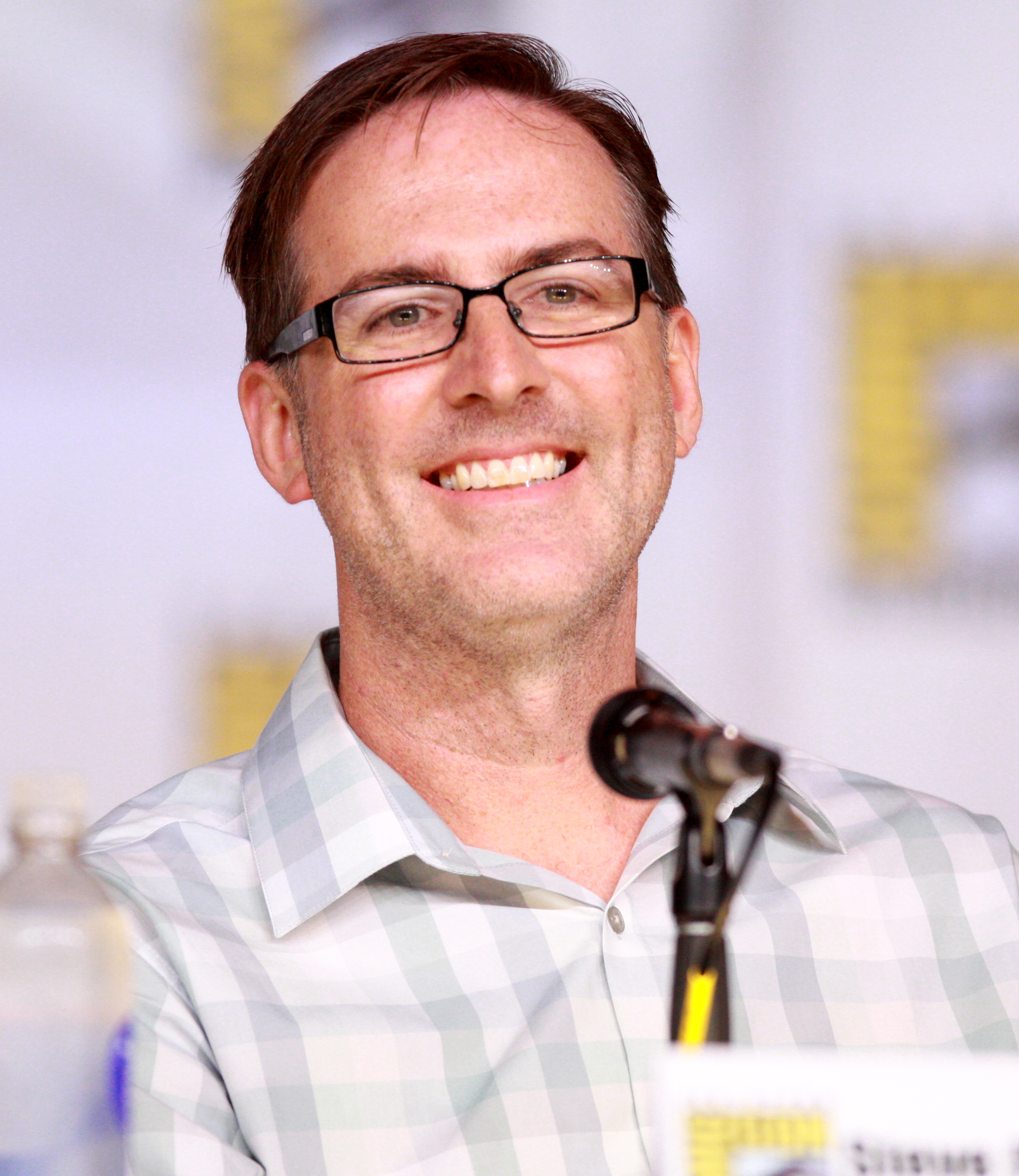
- Franks at Comic Con, San Diego, July 18, 2013
- Born: United States
- Education: University of California, Irvine (B.A.); Loyola Marymount University (M.A.)
- Occupations: Screenwriter, Director
- Spouse: April McDonald

Steve Franks is an American screenwriter, director and musician based in Orange County, California. He is best known as the creator of the USA Network original series Psych.

== Education ==
Franks graduated from the University of California, Irvine in 1991 with a Bachelor of Arts degree in English. He also attended a graduate program at Loyola Marymount University.

== Career ==
He devised the story for the 1999 comedy Big Daddy and wrote the screenplay with Tim Herlihy and Adam Sandler. It went on to be the seventh highest-grossing film of 1999, and was Sandler's highest-grosser domestically until Hotel Transylvania 2 (2015).

Franks created Psych, about a young crime consultant for the Santa Barbara Police Department whose "heightened observational skills" and impressive eidetic memory allow him to convince people that he solves cases with psychic abilities. Psych debuted on Friday, July 7, 2006. He also created the band The Friendly Indians, which recorded the show's theme song. He wrote several episodes of the series, and also directed many. Franks co-wrote and directed Psych: The Movie, a two-hour USA Network TV movie, which aired on December 7, 2017. On February 14, 2019, it was announced Psych: The Movie 2 was greenlit and all the main cast would return for the TV movie. It would be released as Psych 2: Lassie Come Home on July 15, 2020, on Peacock. Psych 3: This Is Gus was released on Peacock November 18, 2021.

In 2014, it was announced Franks was to write and executive produce a pilot for Fox in collaboration with Weezer's lead singer Rivers Cuomo and former Psych writer Chris Henze called DeTour, a comedy inspired by the life of Cuomo. The show was not picked up.

Franks was an executive producer and the showrunner on the CBS series Rush Hour, which was cancelled in May 2016.

== Filmography (Psych) ==
- The extended "Pilot"
- "Spellingg Bee"
- "Speak Now or Forever Hold Your Piece"
- "Woman Seeking Dead Husband — Smokers Okay, No Pets"
- "From the Earth to the Starbucks"
- "Scary Sherry: Bianca's Toast" (with James Roday Rodriguez)
- "American Duos" (with Rodriguez)
- "65 Million Years Off"
- "Black and Tan: A Crime of Fashion" (with Rodriguez)
- "Shawn (and Gus) of the Dead" (Franks also directed)
- "Ghosts"
- "Six Feet Under the Sea" (Franks also directed)
- "Tuesday the 17th" (with Rodriguez)
- "Extradition: British Columbia" (Franks also directed)
- "Bollywood Homicide" (with Anupam Nigam)
- "A Very Juliet Episode" (with Tim Meltreger; Franks also directed)
- "Think Tank" (with Andy Berman)
- "The Head, the Tail, the Whole Damn Episode" (with Meltreger)
- "Romeo and Juliet and Juliet" (Franks also directed)
- "Extradition II: The Actual Extradition Part" (Franks also directed)
- "In Plain Fright" (with Meltreger)
- "Shawn Rescues Darth Vader" (Franks also directed)
- "Indiana Shawn and the Temple of the Kinda Crappy, Rusty Old Dagger" (Franks also directed)
- "Santabarbaratown 2" (with Bill Callahan)
- "Psych: The Musical" (Franks also directed)
- "Lock, Stock, Some Smoking Barrels and Burton Guster's Goblet of Fire" (with Kell Cahoon; Franks also directed)
- "The Break-Up" (Franks also directed)
