= Shawn Spencer =

Fictional character in the television show Psych

- Psych character
- James Roday Rodriguez as Shawn
- First appearance: "Pilot" (Psych; 2006)
- Created by: Steve Franks
- Portrayed by: James Roday Rodriguez (Note: Credited as James Roday.); Liam James (Young Shawn: Seasons 1-5); Skyler Gisondo (Young Shawn: Seasons 5-8)

In-universe information
- Gender: Male
- Occupation: "Psychic Detective"
- Family: Henry Spencer (father); Madeleine Spencer (mother)
- Spouse: Juliet O'Hara
- Significant others: Gina Repach (former); Abigail Lytar (1998, 2009–10)
- Relatives: Jack Spencer (uncle); Henry Spencer, Sr. (paternal grandfather); Emma Spencer (paternal grandmother)

Shawn Spencer is a fictional character and main protagonist on the American television comedy-drama Psych and the sequel film series of the same name played by American actor James Roday Rodriguez. Taking advantage of his eidetic memory and keen observational skills, he poses as a psychic and works as a private detective who often consults with the Santa Barbara Police Department. Shawn and his childhood best friend Gus work together at the eponymous agency Psych.

== Fictional biography ==
Shawn Spencer works as a freelance consultant to the Santa Barbara Police Department, along with his business partner and lifelong best friend Burton "Gus" Guster. Like many fictional detectives, he is very observant and skilled in deductive reasoning. However, he pretends that his skills are due to him being a psychic.

Shawn comes from a family of police officers. His father, Henry, is a decorated sergeant who trained Shawn from childhood to be hyper-observant. This is drawn loosely from the childhood of series creator Steve Franks, who was also born into a family of police officers and whose father "was training [Franks] in his own way to follow his footsteps." Franks' father would ask him how many people were wearing hats in a restaurant, a tactic Henry employs in the series pilot.

In the pilot episode, Shawn earned money by using his observational skills to call in tips for the police. However, he started acting as a consultant for the police because they suspected him of being involved in one of the crimes he was reporting a tip for, not believing that he could have known the information from just watching a news broadcast.

== Characterization ==
Shawn has been compared to Sherlock Holmes. Eden Leone considers Shawn to be a "superman detective", in manner of skill. Robert Arp draws similar comparisons, likening him to Holmes in that both have "seemingly supernatural powers of observation". Cynthia Vinney and Karen E. Dill-Shackleford have called Shawn and his partner, Gus, a "Holmes and Watson story".
