= Gus (Psych) =

Fictional character in the American television show Psych

- Psych character
- Dulé Hill as Burton Guster
- First appearance: "Pilot" (Psych; 2006)
- Created by: Steve Franks and Andy Berman
- Portrayed by: Dulé Hill; Isaah Brown (Young Gus: Season 1); Carlos McCullers II (Young Gus: Seasons 2–present)

In-universe information
- Aliases: Each time the character is introduced, a different alias is used. See all Die Harder, Felicia Fancybottom, Ground Control, Matt, Bighead Burton, Fingers, Homeskillet, Leggo My Eggo, Big Baby Burton, Burton the Billowy Bear, Curtis, Blackstar, Chocolate Columbo, Magic Head, Spellmaster, SuperSmeller or The SuperSniffer, Slicks, Peter Panic, Gus T.T. Showbiz, Ovaltine Jenkins, Schoonie "U-Turn" Singleton, Vernest Lambert Watkins, Bud (from The Cosby Show), Nick Nack, Bruton Gaster, Pinky Guscatero, Lavender Gooms, Lemongrass Gogulope, Squirts MacIntosh, Weepy Boy Santos, Stewart Lee, Dr. Mc [Khoesan tongue clicking sounds] Took, Dr. Pratt, François, Galileo Humpkins, Gus "Silly-Pants" Jackson, Fearless Guster, Shmuel Cohen, Methuselah Honeysuckle, Shutterfly Simmons, Patty Simcox, Chesterfield McMillan (and wife), Tan, Tangus, Ernesto Agapito Garces Conde de Abelar, Longbranch Pennywhistle, Scrooge Jones, D'Andre Pride, Hummingbird Saltalamacchia, Step-Anthony Wally Ali (Cat Stuck in a Tree), Dequan "Smallpox" Randolph, Trapezius Milkington, Hitch, Note To Self, Sterling Cooper, Burton "Oil Can" Guster, Hollabackatcha, Jazz Hands, Gus Brown, John Slade, Detective Miles, Greg, Doughnut Holschtein, Ron Davis, Bob Adams, Harry Munroe, Rich Fingerland, Black Magic, Cheswick, Shawn, Shaggy Buddy Snap, Ghee Buttersnaps a.k.a. "The Heater", The Vault of Secrets, Clementine Woolysocks, Pinky Guscatero, Guts, Ol' Ironside, Old Iron Stomach, Bruce Lee, Jonathan Jacob Jingley-Smith, Santonio Holmes, Deon Richmond, Gurton Buster, Chaz Bono, Chocolate Einstein, MC ClapYoHandz, Sher-Black-Lock, Mrs. Whittlebury, G-Force, Roadrash, Mellowrush, Crankshaft, Sammy, Joey Bishop, Slick Fingers, Imhotep or "He Cometh in Peace," Control Alt Delete, Gootsy, The Guster, The Jackal, Adewale Akinnuoye-Agbaje, Yasmine Bleeth, Killerbee, Lodge Blackman, Mission Figs, Sundown, The Black Goose, Original G-String a.k.a. Crowd Pleasah, Button, Braxton, Buster, Radio Star, Gus Jay Gupta, Don Cheadle, Jr., Chezwick, Watson Williams, Benedict Arnold Jackson, Engel Woods, Suggs, Winston Zeddmore, Eddie Adams from Torrance, Brutal Hustler, Lumpkin (Name Never Completed), Felatio Del Toro, Tin Tummy, Sh'Dynasty, Carrington, Satchel Gizmo, Gurn Blandstein, Immaculate Conception, Bill Uvrights, Cinderella, Jonas Gustavsson, Blue Ivy Carter, Vijay Amritraj, Django Unchained, Darryl, Burton Trout, Bad News Marvin Barnes, Lil Wayne, King Mongkut, Trending Ontwitter, Satchel Gizmo, A Player Named Gus, Domo Arigato, Denzel Diggs Underwood Morris Chestnut Washington, John Pon, Dale, Eric Chin, Mr. Tibbs
- Nickname: Gus
- Gender: Male
- Occupation: Pharmaceutical sales rep, moonlighting as private detective
- Family: Bill Guster (father); Winnie Guster (mother); Burton (uncle); Joy Guster (sister)
- Spouse: Selene
- Abilities: High Intellect; Immense sense of smell; Excellent medical knowledge; Excellent detective; Skilled dancer and vocalist

Burton "Gus" Guster is a fictional character on the USA Network television comedy Psych and the sequel film series of the same name played by American actor Dulé Hill. He functions as the "straight man" for Shawn Spencer's antics, and provides sobering advice, helpful knowledge, steady support, and friendship.

== Fictional biography ==
Gus, born sometime in December 1978, has been Shawn Spencer's best friend since childhood. Together they co-own the detective agency "Psych". Gus attended Pomona College. Gus tends to be strait-laced and more cautious. He is the "Watson" sidekick and has a crucial role in the cases the two solve. Gus is often shown to be academically advanced and knowledgeable on various things, particularly math and science; his experience with pharmaceutical sales aids Shawn in his investigations frequently. Unlike the Watson-style sidekick, Gus is not often stupefied by Shawn's crime-solving capabilities, and he often doubts how Shawn comes to some of his conclusions. While Shawn is the "superman detective", he does not see himself as above Gus.

Despite both Shawn and Gus coming to rational conclusions from observable evidence, both occasionally indulge in supernatural explanations for crimes.

== Characterization ==
Janée Burkhalter characterizes Gus as a lonely Black nerd, or "blerd", and various references to Black culture or Black identity appear in the show, such as his acapella group "Blackapella" and hobby of tap dancing. In terms of his "nerd" identity, Gus demonstrates extensive knowledge on a wide variety of subjects and studies, as well as adhering to grammatical rules and showing interest in nerdy media. Burkhalter acknowledges that Gus differs from various nerd tropes or stereotypes in that he is often romantically involved and does not always act or dress as a nerd.

Thornton notes that Gus is also typically the only major Black character for most episodes. The episodes that do, however, feature major Black characters often focus on Gus's friends or family. Thornton also notes that, despite being the sidekick, it is a role that Gus is sometimes reluctant to fulfill, which is a comedic aspect of the show.
