= Yang 3 in 2D =

- Psych episode
- Episode no.: Season 5 Episode 16
- Directed by: Mel Damski
- Written by: Andy Berman and James Roday
- Original air date: December 22, 2010

Guest appearances
- Ally Sheedy as Mr. Yang; Cybill Shepherd as Madeleine Spencer; Jimmi Simpson as Mary Lightly; Mena Suvari as Allison Cowley; Peter Weller as Mr. Yin; Skyler Gisondo as Young Shawn Spencer; Sage Brocklebank as Buzz McNab

Episode chronology
| ← Previous "Dead Bear Walking" | Next → "Shawn Rescues Darth Vader" |
- Psych season 5

"Yang 3 in 2D" is the sixteenth and final episode of the fifth season of Psych, and the 79th episode in the series overall. It is the third and last in a trilogy, which began with "An Evening with Mr. Yang" (3.16) and continued with "Mr. Yin Presents..." (4.16). The episode originally aired on December 22, 2010. Its title pays homage to the increasing number of film sequels to be released in 3-D.

The Yin/Yang trilogy comes to a close as Shawn and Gus race to save a woman kidnapped by Mr. Yin. Only this time, they are forced to use Mr. Yang's knowledge of Yin to solve the case by allowing her to accompany them on the investigation.

== Plot ==
A young woman, Allison Cowley (Mena Suvari), comes into the Santa Barbara, California police station claiming to have just escaped after being kidnapped and held by the notorious serial killer Mr. Yin. Shawn Spencer and the police are wary to believe Allison, as several others come into the station making similar claims involving the Yin case. While being questioned by Shawn and Gus, Allison describes being shackled to a radiator by Yin and shows them a bruised wrist as proof. She takes out a photograph, claiming to have grabbed it before escaping. Shawn is shocked to see a picture of himself as a child standing next to Mr. Yang (Ally Sheedy).

The police accompany Allison back to where she claimed she was held. However, they find the house occupied by an innocent family. Despite Juliet's concern, Shawn still believes Allison. As protection from Yin, Shawn allows her to stay at his father Henry's house while the investigation continues. Meanwhile, the crime lab determines that it was Shawn and Yang in the picture but with a fake background, meaning the photo could have been taken anywhere.

While Allison is asleep in Shawn's old bedroom at Henry's house, Henry hears a noise outside and goes to investigate. When he finds nothing, he rushes upstairs to check on Allison but finds only a yin and yang symbol painted onto the bed. With Allison missing and the clock ticking, Shawn turns to Yang for assistance on finding her partner, Yin. Yang agrees to help, but only if she is released from the psychiatric prison to visit the crime scene.

They all arrive back at Henry's, who has been trying to figure out where the picture was taken and even called his ex-wife Madeleine (Cybill Shepherd) for help. Yang is thrilled to be in Shawn's old bedroom and tells him not to look for something Yin left behind this time, but to look for something he took. Shawn discovers that both The Smiths' record Meat Is Murder and Van Halen's 1984 are missing. Shawn analyses the tracks of the two albums, connecting 'The Headmaster Ritual' and 'Hot For Teacher' to lead him to Allison's teacher at school.

They all race down to the college to discover there has been a substitute in the class for days. They ask the dean for information on the missing Professor Karl Rotmensen, but everything on his CV turns out to be false. Rotmensen's home address is actually an empty field, where they find VHS tapes about Yin and Yang that Mary Lightly (Jimmi Simpson) had made for Shawn before his death. In them, Mary warns that Yin will soon claim Yang as a victim because of his anger about Yang's apprehension and her newfound infamy. Meanwhile, Henry and Madeleine have tracked down their own copy of the photograph and Madeleine remembers it to be taken in front of the neighbor's house. When Henry tells Shawn, he rushes to the house with Burton "Gus" Guster to save Allison. Upon arrival, they hear a recording of Madeleine's voice calling from inside, leading them to proceed before waiting for backup. However, the door shuts behind them and they are locked inside. As the police try to enter, Juliet O'Hara enlists Yang's help as she once knew the house well. Yang agrees on the condition that she may take a new photo with Shawn. Yang leads Juliet in and promptly abandons her in the dark.

Shawn and Gus come face-to-face with Yin

Shawn and Gus have found Allison only to discover she is Yin's new apprentice who has lured them into a trap. Yin (Peter Weller) binds Shawn and Gus and begins filling a syringe with a lethal concoction. Yin intends to murder Gus in front of Shawn, and plans for something more "colorful" for Shawn afterwards. During this scene, Shawn and Gus bicker causing Yin to call them both "insufferable". They insist that Yin must explain all his actions in a long soliloquy before killing them, as this is the correct "protocol" for villains.

Yin obliges, but just after his explanation, Yang enters, calling Yin "Daddy". Shawn and Gus discover that Yin has actually committed each of the murders attributed to Yang, forcing her to assist him for years until she finally allowed Shawn to catch her. Yang had always longed for the perfect childhood she saw Shawn enjoying as a child, which Yin insists was far from ideal as the Spencers' marriage was collapsing and Henry ignored Shawn for work. Yin tells Yang that he was always there for her. Yang asks Yin if she can "come home" and resume helping him, to which he reluctantly agrees, pulling her into a fake fatherly embrace. However, knowing he will never change, Yang injects the syringe into Yin's chest, killing him.

Meanwhile, Juliet finds Allison and attempts to take her to safety. However, Juliet becomes suspicious of Allison's contradicting lies and Allison attacks her. Juliet manages to defeat her and the SWAT team arrives.

Shawn points out to Yang that she is innocent of the murders for which she was convicted, but she admits guilt for allowing Yin to continue. As she is taken back into custody, a new photograph is taken of her and Shawn, fulfilling her agreement with Juliet.

Carlton Lassiter and Buzz McNab discuss the investigation at the police station, and Lassiter insists that he is unaffected. Meanwhile, Shawn and Juliet share a kiss in an interrogation room, finally safe from Yin. Lassiter walks by and witnesses this scene that he finds more horrific than the Yin/Yang investigation. Upon the realization of Shawn and Juliet's unprofessional relationship, Lassiter leaves in shock.

== Production ==
The episode was originally called "Yin 3 in 2D," but was later changed to "Yang 3 in 2D." Mel Damski (who directed "An Evening with Mr. Yang" in 2009) returned to direct. The episode was co-written by Andy Berman (the writer of "An Evening with Mr. Yang" and "Mr. Yin Presents...") and star James Roday (who also wrote and directed "Mr. Yin Presents..."). Due to special guest star Cybill Shepherd's schedule, "Yang 3 in 2D" was forced to be filmed before many of the preceding episodes. Guest stars Ally Sheedy and Jimmi Simpson also returned as their respective characters Yang and Mary. It was later announced that Mena Suvari would make an appearance as Allison Cowley, a woman who had been kidnapped by Yin. Special guest star Peter Weller appeared as Mr. Yin. Due to the replacement of Liam James (Young Shawn) with Skyler Gisondo, the photo of Yang with Shawn had to be re-edited to include Gisondo as Young Shawn, a situation Lassiter makes light of by commenting that the photo appears photo-shopped. An error is included in the episode when Shawn, Gus, Lassiter, and Juliet are watching Mary's tapes. Shawn claims that one of the videos was filmed 2 days before Mary died (during "Mr. Yin Presents..."). The video, however, gives the date of recording as July 30, and Mary died on February 24 according to the previous installment of the trilogy.

== Reception ==
As with the previous Yin/Yang installment, Jonah Krakow of IGN praised the episode. He said that, while the resolution was a bit of a let-down, it was overall a good way to end the fifth season. The episode received a rating of 8.5 out of 10 from the same website.

Like in the two previous season finales, I don't mind when PSYCH gets away from its unique brand of silliness, especially when they can convincingly deliver an hour of suspense and danger instead. While I felt the resolution to the story was a bit of a let-down, overall, the third chapter in the Yin/Yang story was certainly exciting and a strong way to end Season 5.

The episode was viewed by 2.90 million people (on the original airdate), which was down roughly 50 thousand viewers from the previous season finale ("Mr. Yin Presents...").

== Trivia ==
For some reason, the writers of this episode chose to write in a character with the same name as Timothy Omundson's real wife. In the episode, Allison Cowley is played by Mena Suvari. In real life, Allison Cowley is married to Timothy Omundson (since 1997), and is played by Allison Cowley.
