= Mr. Yin Presents... =

- Psych episode
- Episode no.: Season 4 Episode 16
- Directed by: James Roday
- Written by: Andy Berman and James Roday
- Production code: 4016
- Original air date: March 10, 2010

Guest appearances
- Ally Sheedy as Mr. Yang; Rachael Leigh Cook as Abigail Lytar; Jimmi Simpson as Mary Lightly; Sage Brocklebank as Buzz McNab; Christopher Turner as Mr. Yin; Beverley Turner as the Waitress

Episode chronology
← Previous "The Head, the Tail, the Whole Damn Episode"	Next → "Romeo and Juliet and Juliet"
- Psych season 4

"Mr. Yin Presents..." is the sixteenth and final episode of the Fourth season of Psych, and the 63rd episode in the series overall. It premiered on March 10, 2010 on USA Network in the United States. The episode serves as the season 4 finale and is the sequel to the third season's finale, "An Evening with Mr. Yang". It is an important installment in one of the series' few story arcs. A third and final installment of the Yin/Yang series, entitled "Yang 3 in 2D", aired as the fifth season finale.

== Plot ==
Shawn and Gus are attending a triple-feature of famous Alfred Hitchcock films, including (according to a playbill) The Birds, The Man Who Knew Too Much, and Psycho. After squeezing down a row of other patrons, Shawn finally is able to sit down, 20 minutes into Psycho. After finally finishing the films, they exit the theater and bump into Mary Lightly (Jimmi Simpson), one of the key figures in capturing Mr. Yang a year earlier. He takes them to a diner, where they discuss a new book written by Yang. Mary insists that, according to Yang's account of the events leading up to her capture, it was impossible that she was working alone. There had to have been a Yin. Shawn and Gus are skeptical, and leave the diner. Shawn rereads Yang's book but falls asleep. The next morning he and Gus are called to a crime scene. The waitress who had served them their pie at the diner had been found dead. Shawn notices that her body was arranged into a Yin/Yang symbol.

Shawn, Gus, Detective Lassiter, Detective O'Hara, and Mary arrive at the diner, where they find a pie marked with the Yin/Yang sign. Inside is a crossword clue, decoded by Officer McNab (Sage Brocklebank) to mean "Find Me." Mary insists that the events of the past day are the work of Yin. Shawn, Gus, and Mary visit Yang (Ally Sheedy) in the mental institution, where she is kept in solitary confinement. She reveals that she did have a partner, and that her partner is even more psychopathic than she is.

If you think I'm sick, you ain't seen nothing yet.

— Yang

Shawn leads the group back to the theater, using the crossword to find a specific seat. Shawn remembers that the person who had sat in that seat was one of the people he had been forced to squeeze by when trying to get to his seat during the showing of Psycho. After discovering a note, Mary concludes that Yin is working alone, and that, being the opposite of Yang, represents chaos. After realizing that Yin must be basing his devious activities off of Hitchcock films, Gus proposes that they each take several Hitchcock films and watch them all so as to get a better idea what Yin will do next. The others agree, and split up. While watching Vertigo, Shawn falls asleep. During a dream, he sees Juliet, Lassiter, Chief Vick, and his father in classic Hitchcock situations encouraging him to find something. Finally, he sees the person in the theater. He remembers that the person in theater was wearing ankle weights, leading him to believe that Mary is Yin. When he is awakened by Gus, Shawn discovers that, while he was sleeping, someone had vandalized the "Psych" logo on the window to read "Psycho." Shawn believes it was Yin.

Shawn reveals his theory to the police. He urges them to keep Mary on the case and allow him to incriminate himself. When Mary suspiciously arrives with a note from Yin that was left on his doorstep, Lassiter and Juliet trace the clue to a fountain in the park. Meanwhile, Shawn and Gus take a detour to Mary's house. They find a ticket stub proving he had been in the theater and a closet that appears to be a shrine to Yang. At the park, Lassiter and Juliet reach the 39th stair (a reference to Hitchcock's The 39 Steps), but Mary stays behind, blaming his ankle weights. Lassiter notices Mary is gone, but Juliet sees Yin boarding a nearby bus. After failing to stop the bus, Mary appears, claiming to have tried to stop the bus. At Mary's house, Shawn and Gus discover a notebook with several rough drafts of what appears to be Yin's next clue. To Shawn, this confirms his suspicions.

When the police and the Psych duo stake out a location referenced in Yin's rough draft, they see Mary entering the building alone. It appears as if he is preparing for something. Lassiter and Juliet go around the building to catch him, ordering Shawn and Gus to stay in the car. However, they disobey, and enter the building. They find themselves in a studio with surveillance monitors, all covering a staircase. They watch as Mary enters and begins walking up the stairs. They realize that they were wrong about Mary: he is playing the part of Martin Balsam in Psycho. They realize that he is about to be killed. Shawn and Gus try hopelessly to escape the room and save Mary; by the time they find him, he has been stabbed by the real Yin. As he is dying, Mary reveals that he had come alone in an effort to be heroic. Gus notices Yin nearby but he escapes before the police catch him.

Shawn and Gus return to Yang. She tells them to look in her book. Gus protests that he had read the book cover-to-cover. Shawn realizes that the clue might actually be in the cover. He holds the book up to the light as sees a crude drawing of a girl standing near water. Vick calls, and tells them that Yin has left another clue. When they arrive, she tells them that Yin cast each of them as "archetypal characters from Hitchcock's canon." Not even Henry can escape from the deathly casting call, being cast as Sean Connery in Marnie. That night, they arrive at the designated location, where Yin has recreated various sets from Hitchcock films. The five "actors" split up: Henry with Lassiter, Gus with Juliet, and Shawn by himself. Juliet and Gus are lured to a bar, which contains a clue for Juliet. She follows the instructions, but falls through a trapdoor in the floor and is kidnapped.

At the police station, Shawn blames himself. Lassiter asks Shawn to account for all of his friends and family. Henry is safe, and Shawn's mother, Madeleine, is at a conference in New York, where she is safe. However, Abigail, Shawn's girlfriend, is waiting for him at the airport, arriving back temporarily from a six-month trip to Uganda. McNab is designated to pick her up, as Vick deems it is safest that way. As Abigail (Rachael Leigh Cook) sits in his squad car, he turns his head sideways. He slumps forward, unconscious. Yin sprays her with knockout gas and kidnaps her. Shawn receives a phone call from Yin, who tells him that he must choose who he loves more (Juliet or Abigail), and that there is no way to save them both.

Juliet is bound, gagged and dangled from a clock tower. Mr. Yin is there and activates the trap and leaves. Gus and Lassiter deduce her location and go to save her with Vick. Shawn figures out that the picture in the book is a clue to Abigail's location. He goes with Henry to the pier to find Abigail. When Shawn arrives, he surprises Yin, who is just leaving. Yin darts away. Shawn finds Abigail tied up under the pier. He and Henry save her with moments to spare. Meanwhile, Gus and Lassiter make their way to the top of the tower to rescue Juliet. Realizing that the line that is holding Juliet up is about to be severed, Gus grabs the blade and holds it back long enough for Lassiter to jam the gears with his gun. Back at the pier, Henry talks to the police while Shawn speaks with Abigail. She tells him that she can no longer date him if that kind of danger follows him around. Meanwhile, Lassiter goes to talk to Juliet, who is getting frustrated with everyone asking if she's okay. Lassiter tells her that "it's okay to not be fine" and Juliet, overcome with the fear that she was very close to being killed, starts sobbing as Lassiter hugs her. Henry scrapes the painted "O" off of the Psych window. Shawn and Gus attend Mary's racquetball-themed funeral. Yang sits in her cell, staring at a wall. In closing, we see Yin, who takes off his hat and sighs. He looks at a picture of Yang, standing next to a young Shawn Spencer.

== Reception ==
The episode was well liked by critics, including IGN writer Jonah Krakow, who rated it 9.4 out of 10 and awarded it the IGN.com Editor's Choice Award. He particularly praised the red herrings of the episode, including the filmmakers making the audience momentarily believe that Mary and McNabb could be possible Yins. Kraków in particular made note that the episode managed to stay true to the series formula while offering up a nail-biter of an episode: "...at the same time, I love how they can completely switch gears and offer up a legitimately suspenseful episode and still remain true to the premise of the show."

Kraków also speculated on Juliet's breakdown in the epilogue and its ambiguous nature: "It makes sense that she was scared out of her mind, staring death in the eye and needed a shoulder to cry on (in this case, Det. Lassiter), but part of me thinks knowing that Shawn chose to save Abigail instead of her was another reason why she was so upset. Hopefully we'll get some closure to this relationship in the upcoming season." Kraków finished the review with the following:

I had high expectations going into this episode because of the bar they set one year ago with "An Evening with Mr. Yang." This episode of PSYCH exceeded my expectations due to an even more suspenseful story and an even creepier killer. I don't mind that Mr. Yin is still at large because after four seasons, we finally have a foe who's crafty enough to face off against Shawn. I'm a little bummed that the show will be off for a few months, but they couldn't have left on a better note.

Gerald So also praised the episode, but stated that the tone seemed a little too serious compared to the rest of the series. He particularly complimented how the characters worked together to save both Juliet and Abigail in the climax. However, viewership for the episode was down from previous weeks to only 2.95 million viewers.

The episode received an Emmy Award nomination for Outstanding Music Composition For a Series (Original Dramatic Score). The music was composed by Adam Cohen and John Robert Wood.

=== Hitchcock references ===
The entire episode was based upon several themes and iconic scenes from Alfred Hitchcock's canon.

- The title of the episode is a play on the title of the television series hosted by Hitchcock, Alfred Hitchcock Presents.
- Shawn arrives 20 minutes late to the theater to watch Psycho. This is a reference to the initial release of the film, in which Hitchcock instructed theater owners not to allow people into the theater after the film had begun.
- When Shawn and Gus encounter Mary after the movies, it is raining and people are carrying umbrellas, and Mary appears wearing a white trenchcoat and carrying an umbrella, in reference to the famous umbrella scene in Foreign Correspondent.
- During the opening of the initial diner sequence, an Alfred Hitchcock look alike can be spotted in the background. This is a reference to Hitchcock's cameo in every one of his films.
- The waitress at the diner brings Gus a glass of milk, a reference to Suspicion.
- When delivering the glass of milk to Gus, the waitress says, "here's your milk, Dollface", a reference to Dollface Cosmetics, a fictional company mentioned in The Birds.
- When Shawn rises to leave the diner, refusing to help Mary catch Yin, Mary grabs Shawn's lower arm to prevent him leaving, and the arm-grab is then shown in close-up. This is a reference to the scene in To Catch a Thief in which Francie (Grace Kelly) does the same in an attempt to prevent Robie (Cary Grant) from leaving after refusing to help catch the real burglar.
- When removing Mary's hand from his arm, Shawn says, "Good luck at the Creepy Arm-grab awards this year, Mary; I think you have a real shot at winning," which could refer to the fact that Hitchcock was frequently nominated but never won a contested Academy Award.
- After Shawn and Gus leave the diner, Mary elaborately cuts his pie with his fork and knife, a reference to the murder scene in Sabotage in which Mrs. Verloc kills her husband.
- The necktie strangling of the waitress was a reference to Frenzy.
- Yang's book was "Edited by Dr. Anne Powers, PHD". Dr. Anne Powers, PhD. was a writing colleague of Robert Bloch (writer of Psycho), who, along with him, wrote many episodes of Alfred Hitchcock Presents. Later in her career, Powers served on the faculty of Marquette University as a creative writing professor.
- When entering the mental institution to visit Yang, Mary Lightly inserts a non-sequitur into the conversation, casually saying, "I crave sweet, sweet mushrooms." This is likely a reference to a 1959 episode of Alfred Hitchcock Presents, titled "Special Delivery." The episode revolves around a delivery of mushroom spores.
- Shawn has a dream sequence in which each of the characters are shown in classic Hitchcock situations. Detective O'Hara is shown speaking to him in the famous shower scene from Psycho, Detective Lassiter is dressed as a woman with a kitchen knife mimicking a woman's voice, just as Norman Bates was in the same film, and Shawn (dressed as a woman) is shown sitting in a theater seat with tongue hanging out and with blue lips, strangled with a necktie and posed exactly as the corpse from Frenzy.
- Lighting effects simulating a flashbulb, and the sound of flashbulbs going off are used during Shawn's dream sequence, and the sleeping Shawn flinches in reaction to the light effects in the same way that Raymond Burr reacted to them in Rear Window.
- While Shawn is reviewing Hitchcock films and falls asleep, Yin paints a red "O" on the Psych window, leaving it to read "Psycho," a reference to the film of the same name.
- In an out-take, the crossword puzzle providing the clue that gives the location of the seat in which Yin sat at the theater was found (from a phone call to the newspaper made by Lassiter) to have been written by Ben McKenna, a name Gus recognizes as being a character from The Man Who Knew Too Much.
- When suspecting Mary of being Yin, Shawn's line "Cat and mouse, cat and mouse. But which is the cat and which is the mouse?" is a direct quote from Rope.
- When Shawn makes a realization about the case, a dolly zoom is used, in which the camera moves forwards while zooming out, creating distortion of the picture. This technique was famously used by Hitchcock in Vertigo.
- While running towards Yin's clue, Lassiter is forced to duck underneath a low-flying plane, as Cary Grant's character Roger Thornhill must in North by Northwest.
- Yang's aversion to colors and Mary's lost shoe are references to events in Marnie - the main character fears red and loses a shoe whilst committing a robbery.
- While looking for Yin, Lassiter and O'Hara must climb a staircase to the 39th step, a reference to The 39 Steps.
- Just before Mary is killed, he is shown walking up a staircase, as in Psycho.
- In her cell, Yang exercises with a ball, rolling it to the corner then saying, "Roll it back, Reginald." This could be a reference to silent film star Reginald Gardiner whose first screen appearance was in Hitchcock's 1926 The Lodger: A Story of the London Fog.
- Yin's recreation of Hitchcock film sets included many props from Rear Window (overlooking window with wheelchair, in which Shawn sits and raises his left leg like Jimmy Stewart), Vertigo (Ernie's restaurant), The Man Who Knew Too Much (filmed scenes shown in rear window of the car in which Henry and Lassiter sit), Lifeboat (a lifesaver), The Birds, and Marnie (the car).
- When Gus and Lassiter run up a staircase to save Juliet, the camera view is rotated and descends the tower stairways to look like an iconic scene from Vertigo.
- While Gus and Shawn are in Mary's house, they notice that the number π (pi) is written out on Mary's walls. This is a reference to the film Torn Curtain in which a character is named π.
- The tower clock is stopped (thus saving Juliet) at 4:29, a reference to Hitchcock's death on April 29, 1980.
- Juliet's grey suit is reminiscent of Madeline's/Judy's in Vertigo's bell tower scene.

== Sequel ==
The final installment of the Psych Yin/Yang trilogy, entitled "Yang 3 in 2D", aired on December 22, 2010 as the fifth season finale. The episode follows Shawn and Gus as they, along with Yang (Ally Sheedy) and the rest of the SBPD, attempt to track down and arrest Yin one final time.
