= Psych season 6 =

Psych
- Season 6
- Region 1 DVD cover.
- Starring: James Roday; Dulé Hill; Timothy Omundson; Maggie Lawson; Kirsten Nelson; Corbin Bernsen
- No. of episodes: 16

Release
- Original network: USA Network
- Original release: October 12, 2011 – April 11, 2012

Season chronology
- ← Previous; Season 5 Next → Season 7

The sixth season of Psych, consisting of 16 episodes, premiered on the USA Network in the United States on October 12, 2011 and continued to air until April 11, 2012. James Roday, Dulé Hill, Timothy Omundson, Maggie Lawson, Corbin Bernsen and Kirsten Nelson all reprised their roles as the main characters.

== Production ==
Steve Franks continued to act as showrunner of the series. The song "I Know, You Know," performed by The Friendly Indians, was used once again as the show's theme song, though it was edited three times for theme episodes: "The Amazing Psych-Man & Tap Man, Issue #2" utilized a comic book-style theme song and title sequence. A classic jazz variation was used in "Heeeeere's Lassie" while the theme used in the season four episode "High Top Fade Out" was used once more in "Let's Doo-Wop It Again."

Mel Damski returned to the series once again to direct three episodes, while Steve Franks and James Roday directed two each. John Badham, Andy Berman, Andrew Bernstein, Jay Chandrasekhar, David Crabtree, and Reginald Hudlin directed one episode each, while Timothy Busfield, Jennifer Lynch, and Brad Turner made their Psych directorial debuts in one episode each. Berman, Todd Harthan, and Saladin K. Patterson wrote three episodes for the season. Kell Cahoon, Bill Callahan, Steve Franks, Tim Meltreger, and James Roday returned to the writing staff to pen two episodes each. Carlos Jacott joined the series to write one episode.

The season contained Indiana Jones, "Bull Durham", and Chinatown tributes, along with a Shining-themed episode. Series star Dulé Hill discussed the possibility of having another Twin Peaks themed episode, which would be a sequel to the season 5 episode "Dual Spires." A musical episode was also planned, but was later confirmed to be on hold until the seventh season. Another theme episode revolving around the film Clue was also announced, but was later pushed back to the seventh season as well. Production for the season began in late March 2011.

== Cast ==
James Roday continued in his tenure as the fake psychic detective Shawn Spencer. Dulé Hill continued to portray Burton "Gus" Guster. Timothy Omundson and Maggie Lawson appeared as detectives Carlton "Lassie" Lassiter and Juliet "Jules" O'Hara, respectively. Corbin Bernsen portrayed Henry Spencer, and Kirsten Nelson returned as SBPD Chief Karen Vick.

Sage Brocklebank made further appearances as Buzz McNab. Kurt Fuller returned in many episodes as Woody the Coroner, while Skyler Gisondo and Carlos McCullers II returned as young Shawn and Gus in flashbacks. Cary Elwes returned as Despereaux for an Indiana Jones-themed episode. Jaleel White returned as Gus's former bandmate, Tony. Kenan Thompson was expected to return as Joon, another bandmate, but he did not appear; this disappearance was referenced in "Let's Doo-Wop It Again." Kristy Swanson appeared as Marlowe Viccellio, a mysterious woman who catches Lassiter's eye; she reprised her role in a later episode. Max Gail made his first appearance as Jerry Carp, one of Henry's cop friends. Carlos Jacott returned to the series, but appeared in a different role than in his season one appearance. William Shatner appeared as Juliet's father Frank in two episodes. Other guest stars for the season include Mädchen Amick, Anthony Anderson, Diedrich Bader, Diora Baird, Rob Benedict, Wade Boggs, Wayne Brady, Lolita Davidovich, Brad Dourif, Rob Estes, Corey Feldman, Jennifer Finnigan, Miles Fisher, Patrick Gallagher, Danny Glover, Louis Gossett Jr., Greg Grunberg, Julianna Guill, Tony Hale, Van Hansis, Glenne Headly, Whit Hertford, Jeff Hiller, Stoney Jackson, Matt Kaminsky, Suzanne Krull, Liza Lapira, Tom Lenk, Jocelyne Loewen, Ed Lover, Jessica Lucas, Cheech Marin, Malcolm McDowell, Joey McIntyre, Kate Micucci, Ivana Miličević, The Miz, Lochlyn Munro, Arden Myrin, Mekhi Phifer, Jason Priestley, John Rhys-Davies, Derek Richardson, Molly Ringwald, Sara Rue, Amanda Schull, Lindsay Sloane, French Stewart, Michael Trucco, Marc Evan Jackson, and Polly Walker.

== Episodes ==
List of Psych season 6 episodes
| No. overall | No. in season | Title | Directed by | Written by | Original release date | U.S. viewers (millions) |
|---|---|---|---|---|---|---|
| 80 | 1 | "Shawn Rescues Darth Vader" | Steve Franks | Steve Franks | October 12, 2011 | 3.00 |
While working a case that involves sneaking into the home of a British ambassador (Malcolm McDowell) to retrieve an item, a Darth Vader figure, Shawn discovers a dead body and places his credibility as a psychic in jeopardy. Meanwhile, Lassiter confronts Shawn and Juliet over their relationship, even using a lie detector to get to the truth.
| 81 | 2 | "Last Night Gus" | Andy Berman | Andy Berman | October 19, 2011 | 2.48 |
After a night at a bar, Shawn, Gus, Lassiter, and Woody wake up one morning in the Psych office, not knowing what happened to them the previous night, but there are several clues: Gus' car has been dented, Shawn is wearing things that aren't his, Woody has a white powder on his chin, Lassiter has a black eye and his gun is missing three bullets, and Henry wakes up in a trashed hotel room, without his pants. Shawn's attempts to piece it all together reveal that he had a conversation with Juliet that could change their relationship.
| 82 | 3 | "This Episode Sucks" | James Roday | Todd Harthan & James Roday | October 26, 2011 | 3.28 |
A body that's been drained of its blood is found, and Shawn comes up with–as usual–a crazy theory: the man was killed by a vampire. That same night, Lassiter connects with a woman (Kristy Swanson), but he then finds his personal and professional lives colliding when Shawn, Gus, and Juliet suspect that she was somehow involved in the murder.
| 83 | 4 | "The Amazing Psych-Man & Tap Man, Issue #2" | Mel Damski | Saladin K. Patterson | November 2, 2011 | 3.08 |
A local drug syndicate known as the Caminos falls under attack by a masked vigilante called The Mantis (Miles Fisher), and Lassiter is soured by this since The Mantis has already made more progress than the police. Shawn is also put off, due to Juliet expressing an admiration for The Mantis' efforts. Shawn and Gus believe that a new cop (Joey McIntyre) is the vigilante, but as they put the pieces together, they start to believe that the Mantis' efforts may not be altruistic.
| 84 | 5 | "Dead Man's Curve Ball" | Mel Damski | Bill Callahan | November 9, 2011 | 2.45 |
The hitting coach of the local minor league baseball team suddenly dies with amphetamines in his system. The team's manager (Danny Glover) believes it to be foul play, so he hires Shawn and Gus to go undercover as the new coach and mascot in order to investigate. Shawn winds up uncovering more than just a potential motive for murder, including various secrets between the team.
| 85 | 6 | "Shawn, Interrupted" | Andrew Bernstein | Kell Cahoon | November 16, 2011 | 2.46 |
A billionaire (Brad Dourif) whom Lassiter investigated for murder avoids a jail sentence by means of an insanity defense. After he is sent to a mental hospital, Shawn and Gus go undercover as a patient and orderly, respectively, to prove that the man is sane, but Shawn asks the question that Lassiter didn't even consider: what if the man is actually crazy?
| 86 | 7 | "In for a Penny..." | Mel Damski | Todd Harthan | November 30, 2011 | 3.17 |
As Juliet's birthday approaches, Shawn takes it upon himself–due to his own daddy issues–to reunite her with her estranged father Frank O'Hara (William Shatner) without taking the time to learn that he's a con-man. Not wanting Juliet to be resentful, Shawn hires Frank to assist them in a case involving a safe cracker who was broken out of jail and is attempting to steal a rare coin from an expo run by Sheldon Gates (Marc Evan Jackson). While Frank's knowledge proves useful, his true motives come out.
| 87 | 8 | "The Tao of Gus" | John Badham | Tim Meltreger | December 7, 2011 | 2.70 |
A woman named Nicole (Diora Baird) claims to have witnessed a murder, yet everyone–except for Gus–is having trouble believing her story, and it takes an attempt on her life to make her story credible. Even Juliet is fired at when she is mistaken for Nicole. Shawn and Gus take Nicole to her commune to protect her, which they realize is a cult after meeting its charismatic leader (Diedrich Bader). As usual, Gus' tendency to fall hard for women has consequences: he forgets about the case and devotes all his time to the cult.
| 88 | 9 | "Neil Simon's Lover's Retreat" | Brad Turner | Carlos Jacott | December 14, 2011 | 3.03 |
What starts out as a romantic getaway for Shawn and Juliet turns into disaster when the couple (Jason Priestley and Jennifer Finnigan) they previously befriended rob them and several others (including Tony Hale), and Shawn is especially angry when his Nintendo DS is one of the missing items. Just as a dead body which may be connected to be robberies turns up, Gus, Lassiter and Henry arrive and join the case. When it's all over, Gus learns Shawn was so distressed because he was planning to propose to Juliet with a ring he had hidden inside the Nintendo.
| 89 | 10 | "Indiana Shawn and the Temple of the Kinda Crappy, Rusty Old Dagger" | Steve Franks | Steve Franks | February 29, 2012 | 2.46 |
As Gus confronts Shawn over the diamond ring he just discovered, a valuable shipment of artifacts is stolen from a museum leaving the curator (John Rhys-Davies) furious, so Shawn calls in Pierre Despereaux (Cary Elwes) to help them catch the thief (Mädchen Amick) who stole the shipment, but it's an old dagger that she was really after. As usual, nothing is what it seems since Despereaux is involved, and they understand that the dagger is the key to a much bigger mystery.
| 90 | 11 | "Heeeeere's Lassie" | James Roday | Todd Harthan & Tim Meltreger | March 7, 2012 | 2.86 |
Shawn and Gus are hired by a spooked Lassiter to investigate the strange events at his new condo. Lassiter moved in after the previous tenant was found dead.
| 91 | 12 | "Shawn and the Real Girl" | Timothy Busfield | Andy Berman | March 14, 2012 | 2.57 |
A contestant on a reality TV show in the style of The Bachelorette lands in a coma after a car crash. Immediately Shawn deduces it was no accident, so he and Gus go undercover as two new contestants. Shawn thinks that the culprit is after the show's bachelorette (Lindsay Sloane) until his main suspect is nearly killed, and Shawn starts to question the culprit's motive.
| 92 | 13 | "Let's Doo-Wop It Again" | Jay Chandrasekhar | Saladin K. Patterson & Kell Cahoon | March 21, 2012 | 2.73 |
The founder (Cheech Marin) of an at-risk youth program is nearly killed during a benefit, which also included an a cappella performance from Shawn, Gus, and Gus' friends Tony and Drake (Jaleel White and Mekhi Phifer). Unfortunately, Shawn lands in the hospital after an appendectomy, forcing him to stay on the sidelines, but Gus helps him stay on the case anyway. Lassiter gets help from Marlowe (Kristy Swanson) as he investigates.
| 93 | 14 | "Autopsy Turvy" | Jennifer Lynch | Andy Berman & James Roday | March 28, 2012 | 2.36 |
Woody's apparent mistake on an autopsy–a death he ruled an accident may actually be murder–may very well cost him his job, so Vick has Shawn and Gus take on the case to find out the truth. They are joined by a major fan of Shawn and Gus and overzealous murder expert (French Stewart) as they delve into the underground culture of Santa Barbara, which leads them to believe not only that it was murder, but that their killer is closer than they realize. Woody meanwhile reconnects with a woman (Glenne Headly) he had dated years earlier.
| 94 | 15 | "True Grits" | Reginald Hudlin | Saladin K. Patterson | April 4, 2012 | 2.64 |
A chef (Anthony Anderson) who is exonerated for an armed robbery he didn't commit hires Shawn and Gus to find out who really committed the crime that put him in jail. Shawn learns that it was Juliet's case to begin with, causing a great deal of friction between them, but as two other robberies occur, the mounting evidence reveals something bigger than they expected.
| 95 | 16 | "Santabarbaratown" | David Crabtree | Bill Callahan | April 11, 2012 | 2.71 |
The body of a 70-year-old man also reveals another corpse–a woman named Veronica Towne–from a 20-year-old unsolved murder case. Since the case belonged to Henry and his late partner, Henry returns to detective work and teams with Shawn and Gus to find the killer, who may be the dead man's son (Rob Estes) as well as Veronica's ex-boyfriend. In the course of the investigation, Henry learns some disturbing information about two of his former partners, and decides to retire again permanently from police work as a result. When another former associate, Jerry Carp (Max Gail) inadvertently reveals he too was involved in those activities, Jerry shoots Henry in the chest at point-blank range.

== DVD release ==
All 16 episodes of the sixth season of Psych were released on DVD on October 16, 2012. The four-disc set is presented in anamorphic widescreen format, English Dolby Digital 5.1 surround sound, and with English subtitles. The bonus features of the set include: two extended episodes; deleted and extended scenes; a gag reel; 16 video commentaries featuring creator/writer/executive producer Steve Franks, writers Saladin K. Patterson, Bill Callahan, Andy Berman, Tim Meltreger, Kell Cahoon and Todd Harthan as well as writer/actor James Roday; episode-specific commentaries for "Shawn Rescues Darth Vader", "Last Night Gus", "This Episode Sucks", "In for a Penny...", "Neil Simon's Lover's Retreat", "Indiana Shawn and the Temple of the Kinda Crappy, Rusty Old Dagger", "Heeeeere's Lassie", and "Santabarbaratown"; and three featurettes: "Underground With Psych", "Psychouts", and "Montages". The entire running time for the set is 11 hours, 40 minutes.
