= Psych season 4 =

Psych
- Season 4
- The DVD cover of the fourth season of Psych.
- Starring: James Roday; Dulé Hill; Timothy Omundson; Maggie Lawson; Kirsten Nelson; Corbin Bernsen
- No. of episodes: 16

Release
- Original network: USA Network
- Original release: August 7, 2009 – March 10, 2010

Season chronology
- ← Previous; Season 3 Next → Season 5

The fourth season of Psych originally aired in the United States on USA Network from August 7, 2009 to March 10, 2010. It consisted of 16 episodes. James Roday, Dulé Hill, Timothy Omundson, Maggie Lawson, Corbin Bernsen and Kirsten Nelson reprised their roles as the main characters. James Roday portrayed Shawn Spencer, a fake psychic detective who periodically consults for the Santa Barbara police department. A DVD of the season was released on July 13, 2010.

== Production ==
Steve Franks, creator of the series, returned for the fourth season as showrunner. The theme song, "I Know, You Know" by The Friendly Indians, continued to be used, though it was edited twice: in "Bollywood Homicide", the song was given a Bollywood theme with the lyrics sung in Hindi, while Boyz II Men performed an a cappella version for "High Top Fade Out".

Mel Damski returned to direct four episodes, while Stephen Surjik returned for three and Steve Franks directed two. Returning to direct one episode each were John Badham, Jay Chandrasekhar, Michael McMurray, James Roday and Matt Shakman. Andrew Bernstein and Tawnia McKiernan each joined the show to direct one episode.

Steve Franks wrote five episodes, while Andy Berman wrote four and Kell Cahoon, Saladin K. Patterson and James Roday wrote three. Returning for two episodes each were writers Tim Meltreger and Anupam Nigam. Bill Callahan and Todd Harthan joined the writing team, with Callahan writing three episodes, and Harthan writing one.

== Cast ==
James Roday continued to play fake psychic detective Shawn Spencer. Burton "Gus" Guster returned, portrayed by Dulé Hill. Timothy Omundson returned as Head Detective Carlton "Lassie" Lassiter, while Maggie Lawson continued to portray Juliet "Jules" O'Hara. Corbin Bernsen was kept on as Henry Spencer. Kirsten Nelson continued in her role as SBPD Chief Karen Vick.

Sage Brocklebank continued to portray Officer Buzz McNab. Liam James and Carlos McCullers II continued in their roles as young Shawn and Gus, respectively. Rachael Leigh Cook appeared in four episodes as Abigail Lytar. Kurt Fuller made his Psych debut as Woody the Coroner, who shares many character traits with Shawn, in three episodes.

Ally Sheedy made her second appearance as Mr. Yang, the deranged alleged killer who has been institutionalized, and her appearance marked the first time a villain on the show appeared in more than one episode. Jimmi Simpson made his final appearance as the living Mary Lightly (though he returned post-death twice), and Christopher Turner entered as the chaotic, mysterious Mr. Yin, Yang's other, more dangerous and deranged, half. Cary Elwes made his first appearance as art thief Pierre Desperaux, and Peter Oldring and Ed Lauter appeared as Canadian officers. Ray Wise made his first appearance as Father Westley. Jaleel White made his first appearance as Gus's former bandmate.

Additionally, almost every episode featured a prominent guest star. Among them were Christine Baranski, Jim Beaver, Josh Braaten, James Brolin, John Cena, Jay Chandrasekhar, Tim Conlon, Bruce Davison, Cullen Douglas, Deanna Dunagan, Miguel Ferrer, Azita Ghanizada, Ernie Grunwald, John Hawkes, Sandra Hess, Michael Hogan, Scott Holroyd, Steve Howey, Stacy Keibler, Alexandra Krosney, Stephan Lang, Joshua Malina, David Naughton, Judd Nelson, Larisa Oleynik, Robert Patrick, Sendhil Ramamurthy, Lisa Ray, Michael Rooker, Jeri Ryan, Chris Sarandon, Sarah Shahi, Craig Sheffer, Kenan Thompson, Tony Todd, Beverley Turner, Arnold Vosloo and Thomas F. Wilson.

== Episodes ==
List of Psych season 4 episodes
No. overall	No. in season	Title	Directed by	Written by	Original release date	U.S. viewers (millions)
48	1	"Extradition: British Columbia"	Steve Franks	Steve Franks	August 7, 2009	3.98
While on vacation in Vancouver, Shawn and Gus are suddenly on the trail of elusive art thief Pierre Despereaux (Cary Elwes). Since Lassiter has been trying to arrest this criminal for years, he and Juliet arrive in Canada as well, and Shawn believes that this thief has pulled off the perfect crime, until he realizes what's really going on.
49	2	"He Dead"	Michael McMurray	Saladin K. Patterson	August 14, 2009	4.20
The private jet of billionaire hedge fund manager Warren Clayton crashes in a forest. Shawn and Gus manage to find him first and are asked to fulfill his dying wish: to find out who killed him. His widow (Christine Baranski) is one of the suspects, and as Shawn digs deeper, he uncovers more than a murder. At the same time, Abigail (Rachael Leigh Cook) insists on meeting Henry, which Shawn isn't ready for due to their complicated relationship.
50	3	"High Noon-ish"	Mel Damski	Kell Cahoon	August 21, 2009	3.87
An Old West tourist attraction called Old Sonora, run by Sheriff Hank Mendel (James Brolin), is in danger of being shut down due to sabotage. Since Lassiter is fond of the town – he spent many weekends there as a child – he enlists Shawn and Gus to investigate.
51	4	"The Devil's in the Details... and the Upstairs Bedroom"	John Badham	Bill Callahan	August 28, 2009	4.08
A college girl commits suicide at a Catholic University. While Shawn believes it to be mere suicide, Father Westley (Ray Wise) – one of the professors at the school – and Gus are convinced the girl was demon-possessed. Although he is skeptical towards that idea, Shawn decides to play along, until the case takes a turn.
52	5	"Shawn Gets the Yips"	Tawnia McKiernan	Kell Cahoon & Bill Callahan	September 11, 2009	4.03
As Shawn, Gus, Lassiter, and Juliet are celebrating Buzz McNab's birthday in a police bar, somebody attempts to rob the place and engages in a gunfight with Lassiter. It is believed that the incident was a random attempt at robbery until Shawn reveals that the gunman (Stephen Lang) was targeting a cop.
53	6	"Bollywood Homicide"	Jay Chandrasekhar	Steve Franks & Anupam Nigam	September 18, 2009	3.74
A young East Indian man named Raj (Sendhil Ramamurthy) believes he is cursed when all of his serious girlfriends have met with suspicious accidents. Shawn and Gus decide to figure out what the real problem is, and Juliet also gets involved in a big way. For Shawn, solving the case is a chance to get back at Lassiter for embarrassing him in front of Abigail (Rachael Leigh Cook).
54	7	"High Top Fade-Out"	Stephen Surjik	Saladin K. Patterson & James Roday	September 25, 2009	3.69
The death of Leonard "Diddle" Callahan, a computer cryptologist who was the baritone in Gus's old college a cappella group, is suspected of being murdered, by the other two members (Jaleel White and Kenan Thompson). Although they both had a falling out with Gus, they ask Shawn to investigate, but he and Gus find themselves stonewalled at every turn by the police, and later, an undercover detective (Tony Todd).
55	8	"Let's Get Hairy"	Andrew Bernstein	Todd Harthan & James Roday	October 9, 2009	N/A
A man named Stewart Gimbley (Joshua Malina) believes he is a werewolf, so he offers Shawn and Gus three times their normal rate to tie him up and observe him. Unfortunately, they fall asleep and wake up to find Stewart missing, their window broken, and a tuft of animal hair. Their investigation leads them to a psychiatrist (David Naughton) and a Wiccan (Larisa Oleynik), each with possible secrets. This is also the episode where Henry has to keep touching a truck to win it.
56	9	"Shawn Takes a Shot in the Dark"	Mel Damski	Andy Berman	October 16, 2009	3.68
Gus, O'Hara, and Lassiter arrive at a vehicle storage yard after receiving a message from Shawn. They realize he has been shot and abducted, so Henry works with Lassiter to find him, while Gus tries to remember the details of the case. Shawn realizes that his abduction is part of something much bigger after speaking with his kidnappers (Michael Rooker and John Hawkes).
57	10	"You Can't Handle This Episode"	Mel Damski	Andy Berman	January 27, 2010	4.37
Shawn deduces that a U.S. Army Private who was found hanged was the victim of foul play, and Juliet calls in her brother Ewan (John Cena), a former soldier who has DOD Security Clearance to help them get on the Army base. Unfortunately, Shawn comes into conflict with Juliet over his hunch that Ewan is somehow more deeply involved with the murder. As the case proceeds, Abigail (Rachael Leigh Cook) has some unwelcome news for Shawn.
58	11	"Thrill Seekers and Hell-Raisers"	Mel Damski	Kell Cahoon & Saladin K. Patterson	February 3, 2010	2.86
Gus reveals his new girlfriend Ruby (Sarah Shahi) to Shawn, who hasn't forgotten Gus' poor track record with women – while drunk, he married a crazy woman in 1997 – but immediately takes a liking to Ruby. Shawn and Gus join Ruby and her friends (Stacy Keibler and Steve Howey) on a river-rafting trip, and when one of them goes missing, Shawn figures out two things: it was no accident, and Ruby was somehow involved. Gus learns the truth, and is soon put in a compromising position.
59	12	"A Very Juliet Episode"	Steve Franks	Steve Franks & Tim Meltreger	February 10, 2010	3.57
In 2003, Juliet made a pact with her boyfriend Scott Seaver (Josh Braaten) to meet up in seven years. After he fails to show up, Shawn finds him, and by extension endangers his life since he was a key witness against mobster J.T. Waring (Arnold Vosloo), who was convicted for the murder of a U.S. Marshal. When Waring denies killing the Marshal, Shawn must prove him right in order to protect Scott.
60	13	"Death Is in the Air"	Stephen Surjik	Bill Callahan & Anupam Nigam	February 17, 2010	2.94
A courier named Donny Lieberman (Ernie Grunwald) loses a cooler containing the deadly Thornburg virus, so he asks Shawn and Gus to help him find it, and Shawn realizes that the same lab that Donny was working for is somehow involved. Luckily, they get help from Dr. Steven Reidman (Judd Nelson), the foremost expert on the virus who also expresses interest towards Santa Barbara's favorite psychic. In the race to stop an outbreak, Shawn has an epiphany concerning Juliet.
61	14	"Think Tank"	Stephen Surjik	Steve Franks & Andy Berman	February 24, 2010	3.57
Shawn and Gus are recruited by Walter Snowden (Bruce Davison) into a think tank, joining Boyd (Miguel Ferrer), Svetlana (Sandra Hess) and Alan (Alex Zahara) to help prevent the murder of business tycoon Ashton Bonaventure (Chris Sarandon). While Shawn doesn't shine in the group, he figures out that someone in the think tank was using it to figure out ways to kill Bonaventure, so he convinces Bonaventure to put him in charge of security and re-assembles the remaining members to help him prevent the assassination attempt.
62	15	"The Head, the Tail, the Whole Damn Episode"	Matt Shakman	Steve Franks & Tim Meltreger	March 3, 2010	2.87
A shark attack victim washes up onshore, and Lassiter notices what appears to be a knife wound on the body. With that, he thinks that the victim was actually murdered, which impresses Shawn since it is a theory that he would come up with. Meanwhile, Henry begins flirting with a shark expert (Jeri Ryan) and a fisherman (Michael Hogan) lends Shawn and Gus a hand.
63	16	"Mr. Yin Presents..."	James Roday	Andy Berman & James Roday	March 10, 2010	2.95
As Mr. Yang's (Ally Sheedy) book is released, Shawn and Gus meet up with Mary Lightly (Jimmi Simpson), who believes that Yang had a partner (Christopher Turner), and he turns out to be right when a dead body (Beverley Turner) turns up. As another murder is committed, Shawn, Gus, Juliet, Lassiter, and Henry find themselves in scenarios from classic Hitchcock films in order to stop Yin. Just like Yang, Mr. Yin makes it personal when Abigail (Rachael Leigh Cook) is dragged into his game. However, she is not the only victim...
