= Psych season 5 =

Psych
- Season 5
- The DVD cover of the fifth season of Psych
- Starring: James Roday; Dulé Hill; Timothy Omundson; Maggie Lawson; Kirsten Nelson; Corbin Bernsen
- No. of episodes: 16

Release
- Original network: USA Network
- Original release: July 14 – December 22, 2010

Season chronology
- ← Previous; Season 4 Next → Season 6

The fifth season of Psych, consisting of 16 episodes, premiered on USA Network in the United States on July 14, 2010 and concluded on December 22, 2010. A DVD of the season was released on May 31, 2011. Production officially started in Vancouver, British Columbia on April 28, 2010. James Roday, Dulé Hill, Timothy Omundson, Maggie Lawson, Corbin Bernsen and Kirsten Nelson all reprised their roles as the main characters.

== Production ==
Steve Franks continued in his role of showrunner. "I Know, You Know", performed by The Friendly Indians, continued to serve as the show's theme song, though the title sequence was changed four times. For the episode "Romeo and Juliet and Juliet", the main titles were translated into Chinese. For "Shawn 2.0", guest star Curt Smith recorded an interpretation of the theme, and Julee Cruise performed a slower extended version for "Dual Spires". The theme song used originally for "Gus's Dad May Have Killed an Old Guy" in the second season was used once again for "The Polarizing Express". Curt Smith also recorded an original song, entitled "This is Christmas", for the episode.

Mel Damski directed four episodes for the season, while Steve Franks directed two. John Badham, Andrew Bernstein, Jay Chandrasekhar, Tawnia McKiernan, James Roday, Matt Shakman, and Stephen Surjik directed one episode each. David Crabtree and Reginald Hudlin joined the series to direct one episode each. Andy Berman began his directing career with the episode "Dead Bear Walking".

Berman also wrote four episodes for the season. Bill Callahan wrote four as well, while Steve Franks, Saladin K. Patterson, and James Roday wrote three. Kell Cahoon and Tim Meltreger wrote two episodes each.

== Cast ==
James Roday continued to play fake psychic detective Shawn Spencer. Burton "Gus" Guster returned, portrayed by Dulé Hill. Timothy Omundson returned as Head Detective Carlton "Lassie" Lassiter, while Maggie Lawson continued to portray Juliet "Jules" O'Hara. Corbin Bernsen remained in his role as Henry Spencer, who, as of the first episode, had returned to the SBPD part-time. Kirsten Nelson continued to portray SBPD Chief Karen Vick.

Sage Brocklebank returned as Officer Buzz McNab, Kurt Fuller returned as Woody the Coroner, and Liam James and Carlos McCullers II reprised their roles as young Shawn and young Gus, respectively. Liam James was abruptly replaced midway through the season by Skyler Gisondo.

Nestor Carbonell appeared in two episodes as Declan Rand, a criminal profiler who briefly dates Juliet. Jerry Shea appeared in two episodes as well, as Ken, an assistant for the Psych offices. In the mid-season premiere, Cary Elwes returned as Despereaux, and Peter Oldring and Ed Lauter returned as Canadian officers. Ray Wise returned as Father Westley in a Twin Peaks-themed episode. In the season finale, Ally Sheedy returned as Mr. Yang and Peter Weller appeared as Mr. Yin (and was revealed to be Yang's father), while Cybill Shepherd returned as Madeleine Spencer and Jimmi Simpson appeared in videotape footage of Yin/Yang expert profiler Mary Lightly (since Lightly had been killed in the previous season, this marked the first of several post-death appearances for the character).

Other notable guest stars for the season included Kevin Alejandro, Dana Ashbrook, Doron Bell Jr., April Bowlby, Catherine E. Coulson, Tony Cox, John DeSantis, William Devane, Nora Dunn, Sherilyn Fenn, Lee Garlington, Jon Gries, Michael Gross, Danielle Harris, John Michael Higgins, C. Thomas Howell, Brian Klugman, Rob LaBelle, Don Lake, Sheryl Lee, Robyn Lively, Bruce Locke, Ralph Macchio, Angus Macfadyen, April Matson, Chi McBride, Ryan McDonald, Vanessa Minnillo, Meredith Monroe, Becky O'Donohue, Franka Potente, Freddie Prinze, Jr., Keshia Knight Pulliam, Brad Raider, Adam Reid, Adam Rodriguez, Jean Smart, Charles Martin Smith, Curt Smith, Lauren Lee Smith, Mena Suvari, Jacob Vargas, Lenny Von Dohlen, and Carl Weathers.

== Episodes ==
List of Psych season 5 episodes
No. overall	No. in season	Title	Directed by	Written by	Original release date	U.S. viewers (millions)
64	1	"Romeo and Juliet and Juliet"	Steve Franks	Steve Franks	July 14, 2010	3.68
A powerful businessman's daughter (Jennifer Liu) is kidnapped, and matters are made more complicated because the businessman (Bruce Locke) is a Triad leader. Although the case is best suited for Shawn and Gus, Henry – who is now in charge of the police consultants – refuses to hire them. As he investigates the kidnapping, Shawn attempts to help Juliet, who has not been the same since her near-death experience. Meanwhile, Shawn and Gus are aided by their recently-fired assistant (Jerry Shea).
65	2	"Feet Don't Kill Me Now"	Mel Damski	Saladin K. Patterson	July 21, 2010	3.30
During a murder investigation, Gus decides to team up with Lassiter over a spat with Shawn, and for the fact that they happen to share a common interest: tap-dancing. Since she has been getting very poor treatment from her partner after her return, Juliet teams with Shawn, but working a case together is not exactly a match made in heaven.
66	3	"Not Even Close... Encounters"	John Badham	Bill Callahan	July 28, 2010	3.74
A prominent lawyer (Charles Martin Smith) claims that one of his co-workers (Adam Reid) was abducted by aliens, and Shawn and Gus waste no time jumping on the case, turning to an old friend (Freddie Prinze, Jr.) for help since he happens to believe in aliens. Unfortunately, their credibility takes a major blow, and despite wanting it to be an alien abduction, Shawn winds up being the sane one in the investigation.
67	4	"Chivalry Is Not Dead... But Someone Is"	Jay Chandrasekhar	Andy Berman	August 4, 2010	3.48
A wealthy widow's young boyfriend falls to his death, which turned out to be the result of poisoning. Lassiter quickly thinks that the widow (Jean Smart) is responsible, but Shawn and Gus believe that the victim was trained to be a con artist by the man (John Michael Higgins) they think is the actual murderer. Shawn takes a different approach than usual to figure it out, but the case takes a turn for him. Meanwhile, Gus attempts to charm an older woman (Lee Garlington).
68	5	"Shawn and Gus in Drag (Racing)"	Mel Damski	Kell Cahoon & Tim Meltreger	August 11, 2010	3.78
A member of a street-racing gang is found dead in a stolen Lamborghini Murciélago. Since it happens to coincide with a case that Lassiter has been working for months with no success, Henry hires Shawn and Gus to pick up the slack. They are able to infiltrate the street-racing syndicate with surprising success, thanks to Shawn impressing ringleader Tommy (Adam Rodriguez).
69	6	"Viagra Falls"	Andrew Bernstein	Todd Harthan	August 18, 2010	4.11
An investigation into the death of a former police chief reveals that he may have been involved in criminal activity after his retirement, but as they work the case, Shawn and Gus clash with two of his former colleagues (Carl Weathers and William Devane) who have been brought in as consultants to solve his murder and potentially clear his name.
70	7	"Ferry Tale"	Reginald Hudlin	Kell Cahoon & Saladin K. Patterson	August 25, 2010	3.63
As they are on a ferry en route to the Channel Islands for an environmental cleanup, Shawn and Gus must help a prison guard (Chi McBride) round up four inmates (including Kevin Alejandro) who escaped his custody, which leads to a stand-off with the police, and Shawn discovers that the escape attempt was not simply to avoid prison time, but for a deeper purpose.
71	8	"Shawn 2.0"	David Crabtree	Bill Callahan	September 1, 2010	3.70
Shawn isn't sure what to think when talented criminal profiler Declan Rand (Nestor Carbonell) comes to Santa Barbara to help track down a serial killer (Meredith Monroe) who is targeting people on a liver transplant list. This turns into a positive when Shawn is shaken out of his complacency, but Declan isn't just a professional rival, but a personal one. Meanwhile, Shawn must find a date to a wedding, and gets to meet one of his childhood heroes (Curt Smith).
72	9	"One, Maybe Two, Ways Out"	Mel Damski	Andy Berman & Todd Harthan	September 8, 2010	3.11
Shawn crosses into unfamiliar territory when a spy (Franka Potente) – with a connection to both Shawn and Juliet – asks for his assistance when she is framed for a crime she didn't commit. The case takes surprising turns when Shawn locates one of the spy's associates (Jon Gries) and is targeted by the U.S. government (including C. Thomas Howell). Along the way, Shawn must ask Declan (Nestor Carbonell) for help, and learns that he and Juliet have gotten serious. However, during the course of the investigation, Juliet overhears Shawn admit his feelings for her, which results in them having an emotional moment that will change everything.
73	10	"Extradition II: The Actual Extradition Part"	Steve Franks	Steve Franks	November 10, 2010	2.79
Shawn and Gus return to Vancouver on a trip funded by imprisoned art thief Pierre Despereaux (Cary Elwes), who is about to be extradited by Lassiter. Despereaux escapes from jail to commit one last job but is framed for the death of a Crown attorney, so Shawn wastes no time in finding out the truth. When Shawn sees that Juliet has shown up in Canada, he decides to stop running from his feelings for her.
74	11	"In Plain Fright"	Stephen Surjik	Steve Franks & Tim Meltreger	November 17, 2010	2.99
While on a haunted house ride at a local theme park, Shawn witnesses a murder. The park's vice-president (Rob LaBelle) thinks that it was the ghost of a kid who fell to his death 15 years ago, but then another death occurs, and Shawn & Gus learn that there are those (including Eve (Nora Dunn)) with a 15-year-old cross to bear. Meanwhile, Shawn runs into Ken (Jerry Shea) and gets him fired from a second job, and Juliet pressures Shawn to tell Gus about their new relationship.
75	12	"Dual Spires"	Matt Shakman	Bill Callahan & James Roday	December 1, 2010	3.54
In a tribute to the David Lynch and Mark Frost television series Twin Peaks, Shawn and Gus receive an email for a cinnamon festival in the small and isolated town of Dual Spires, arriving only to find a dead female drowning victim, who according to Juliet, was not only originally from Santa Barbara but had apparently drowned seven years ago. Indeed, this town is not all that it seems. Twin Peaks actors Dana Ashbrook, Catherine E. Coulson, Sherilyn Fenn, Sheryl Lee, Robyn Lively, Lenny Von Dohlen, Ray Wise, and the voice of Julee Cruise are all featured.
76	13	"We'd Like to Thank the Academy"	Tawnia McKiernan	Bill Callahan & Todd Harthan	December 8, 2010	3.09
Thinking that Shawn and Gus' investigative tactics need work, Henry and Vick send them to the police academy for a three-week crash course in police procedures, with an instructor (Ralph Macchio) who may not be suited for actual police work. Shawn can't help but get involved in a robbery case which also involves money laundering, and Vick learns that it is best to leave well enough alone.
77	14	"The Polarizing Express"	James Roday	Saladin K. Patterson & James Roday	December 15, 2010	2.43
Shawn makes a mistake which leads to evidence getting thrown out against a crime lord, getting himself suspended indefinitely and his father fired from the SBPD. Through a series of dreams guided by Tony Cox - which reveal what life would've been like for his friends if he hadn't returned to Santa Barbara - Shawn finds a new way to put the crime lord in jail and redeem himself.
78	15	"Dead Bear Walking"	Andy Berman	Andy Berman	December 15, 2010	2.53
A polar bear's trainer is found dead, and the bear is thought to be the culprit by everyone except Shawn. The problem is, he now has to keep the bear hidden, but Gus would rather see the ursus maritimus dead which complicates things. In the midst of the case, Lassiter becomes the subject of a documentary, filmed by his kid sister (April Bowlby), who finds Shawn and Gus (who has a crush on her) more interesting.
79	16	"Yang 3 in 2D"	Mel Damski	Andy Berman & James Roday	December 22, 2010	2.90
A woman named Allison Cowley (Mena Suvari) claims to have escaped from Yin (Peter Weller). After Shawn sees something connecting him to Yang (Ally Sheedy), Shawn decides to use her in the investigation, which involves her leaving the psych ward. Since she was one of Yin's victims, Juliet struggles through the case, but she, like everyone else, is hell-bent on putting an end to Yin. Meanwhile, Shawn's mother (Cybill Shepherd) returns to Santa Barbara, and the team gets a surprising message from Mary Lightly (Jimmi Simpson).
