= Dual Spires =

- Psych episode
- Sheriff Jackson, Doc Gooden, and Robert Barker find the body of Paula Merral.
- Episode no.: Season 5 Episode 12
- Directed by: Matt Shakman
- Written by: Bill Callahan; James Roday
- Original air date: December 1, 2010
- Running time: 50 minutes

Guest appearances
- Dana Ashbrook as Robert Barker; Catherine E. Coulson as Woman with Wood; Sherilyn Fenn as Maudette; Sheryl Lee as Doc Gooden; Robyn Lively as Michelle Barker; Ryan McDonald as Jack Smith; Lenny Von Dohlen as Sheriff Jackson; Ray Wise as Father Westley; Scott Lyster as Randy Jackson; Kiara LeBlanc as Paula Merral; John DeSantis as Seven Foot Tall Man

Episode chronology
← Previous "In Plain Fright"	Next → "We'd Like to Thank the Academy"
- Psych season 5

"Dual Spires" is the 12th episode of the fifth season of the American comedy-drama television series Psych, and the 75th episode overall. The episode was directed by Matt Shakman and written by Bill Callahan and series star James Roday Rodriguez. It originally aired December 1, 2010.

The episode is a homage to the television series Twin Peaks and features seven cast members of the series: Sherilyn Fenn, Sheryl Lee, Dana Ashbrook, Robyn Lively, Lenny Von Dohlen, Catherine E. Coulson, and Ray Wise. After receiving an e-mail inviting them to a cinnamon festival, Shawn Spencer (James Roday Rodriguez) and Burton "Gus" Guster (Dulé Hill) travel to the quirky small town of Dual Spires. Once there, they are caught up in the mysterious drowning death of teenager Paula Merral.

"Dual Spires" received generally positive reviews from critics. According to the Nielsen ratings system, it drew 3.543 million viewers, with a 2.2/4 share among all households and a 1.3/4 share among those aged 18–49.

== Plot ==
After receiving a flier by email inviting them to a cinnamon festival, private detectives Shawn Spencer (James Roday Rodriguez) and Burton "Gus" Guster (Dulé Hill) travel to the quirky small town of Dual Spires. Shawn and Gus eat cinnamon pie at the Sawmill Diner, an establishment owned by Robert "Bob" Barker (Dana Ashbrook) and his wife Michelle (Robyn Lively) and built on a sawmill that burned down in 1958, killing eight people. Soon, the body of Bob and Michelle's niece, Paula Merral (an anagram of Laura Palmer, the Twin Peaks murder victim), is found by a lake.

Sheriff Andrew Jackson (Lenny Von Dohlen) rules the death an accident, but Shawn receives the Dewey Decimal Classification number of a book, Reincarnation and Rebirth, the title of which parallels the revelation that Paula had supposedly drowned in Santa Barbara, California seven years earlier, though her body was never found. Bob reveals that Michelle's unstable sister Lucy left Dual Spires, taking with her Paula, whom Michelle and Bob had all but raised. When Paula sent them a letter detailing the drug use and child abuse, they helped Paula fake her death so she could leave Lucy. Detectives Juliet O'Hara (Maggie Lawson) and Carlton Lassiter (Timothy Omundson) reopen the case and leave to issue a warrant for Bob's arrest.

Shawn and Gus continue the investigation and, finding an entry in Paula's diary about meetings with "J", are led to partially blind photographer Jack Smith (Ryan McDonald). Jack reveals a photograph of Sheriff Jackson's son Randy (Scott Lyster), taken just before Jack was attacked during a walk with Paula. Randy reveals that after he attacked Jack, Paula confronted him about his ex-girlfriend, who Shawn deduces is librarian Maudette Hornsby (Sherilyn Fenn). However, Hornsby is found hanged at the library, and Sheriff Jackson and Dr. Donna "Doc" Gooden (Sheryl Lee) rule that Maudette killed Paula out of jealousy and committed suicide to keep the town from knowing about the affair. Shawn, however, deduces that Maudette was the one that led them to the festival and left clues for them to decode.

Suddenly, Shawn and Gus are locked in the library and it is lit on fire, but they are rescued by Father Peter Westley (Ray Wise). Bob, who is revealed to be Paula's biological father, explains that after World War I, his great-grandfather established the town with two other soldiers, intending to create a secluded utopia. After the sawmill fire in 1958, the town began to look at all outsiders as a threat. When Doc Gooden and Sheriff Jackson enter and hold him at gunpoint, Shawn deduces that they are the leaders of the other two founding families. Due to Gooden's infertility and Jackson's terminal cancer, Randy was the only known direct descendant and therefore the sole future leader. To stop Randy from leaving town with a paranoid Paula, the sheriff and doctor drowned her. After Lassiter and O'Hara arrive and arrest Gooden and Jackson, the group celebrates at the diner, only to be repulsed by a number of oddities referencing Twin Peaks.

== Production ==
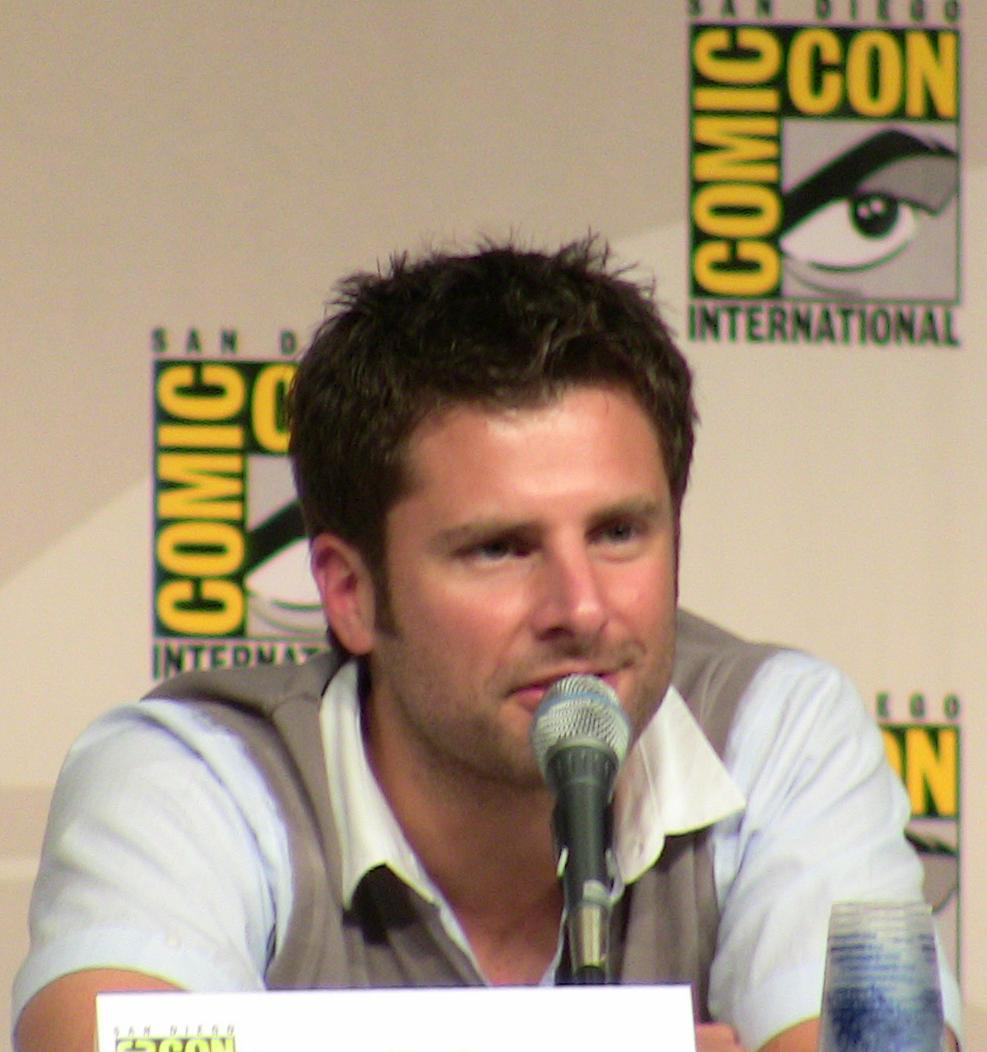
Series star James Roday Rodriguez co-wrote "Dual Spires", calling Twin Peaks his favorite series of all time.

"Dual Spires" was the fourth episode directed by Matt Shakman, the sixth to be written by producer Bill Callahan, and sixth to be written by series star James Roday Rodriguez. It originally aired in the United States on December 1, 2010, on USA Network as the 12th episode of Psych's fifth season and the 75th episode overall. It was an extended episode, at 67 minutes including commercials or 50 without.

According to trivia on the "Dual Spires enhanced" video at the Psych website, a Twin Peaks tribute episode had been in the works since season one. Maggie Lawson was the one who suggested the episode's title, a play on that of the original series. The episode aired 20 years to the day after the 16th episode of Twin Peaks, which answered the question of who killed Laura Palmer, after which, Mike Hale of The New York Times wrote, "there was really no reason to keep watching."

The episode features seven Twin Peaks cast members as guest stars. Roday Rodriguez explained that his friend Dana Ashbrook, a Twin Peaks regular, convinced other actors to join in. Roday Rodriguez added that "there was such a tenderness to the way all of them hold that experience and hold that material."

- Dana Ashbrook (Bobby Briggs) plays Robert "Bob" Barker, the co-owner of the town diner;
- Robyn Lively (Lana Budding Milford) plays Michelle Barker, the co-owner of the town diner;
- Lenny Von Dohlen (Harold Smith) plays Sheriff Andrew Jackson;
- Sheryl Lee (Laura Palmer / Maddy Ferguson) plays Dr. Donna "Doc" Gooden, Dual Spires' psychiatrist, pediatrician, optometrist, gastrologist, podiatrist, dermatologist, orthodontist, forensic scientist, veterinarian, lawyer, and accountant;
- Sherilyn Fenn (Audrey Horne) plays Maudette Hornsby, the town librarian;
- Catherine E. Coulson (Log Lady) cameos as a woman carrying wood; and
- Ray Wise (Leland Palmer) reprises his Psych role as Father Peter Westley.

In addition, Mädchen Amick, who played diner waitress Shelly Johnson, agreed to appear as Michelle Barker but dropped out due to a family issue. Michael Ontkean, who played Harry S. Truman, was also approached to appear in the episode. Other guest stars include Scott Lyster as Randy Jackson and Ryan McDonald as Jack Smith.

Additionally, Julee Cruise, who recorded the theme for Twin Peaks, recorded a slower, extended version of the Psych theme song, "I Know You Know" by series creator Steve Franks's band The Friendly Indians. The imagery that accompanies it is an almost shot-for-shot recreation of the Twin Peaks opening sequence, with a white horse that resembles the one in Sarah Palmer's vision before the attack on Maddy Ferguson. Later, during a bicycle chase scene, "Baby Did a Bad Bad Thing" by Chris Isaak is heard. Isaak portrayed Special Agent Chester Desmond in Twin Peaks: Fire Walk with Me.

The creative team initially wanted Twin Peaks co-creator David Lynch to guest star as Mayor Douglas Fir, but eventually decided not to ask due to Roday Rodriguez's concern over what Lynch would think of the episode. According to Roday Rodriguez, Lynch's daughter Jennifer - who later directed several Psych episodes - once implied to him that her father had seen the episode and was "pleased" with it.

== Cultural references ==
=== Allusions to Twin Peaks ===
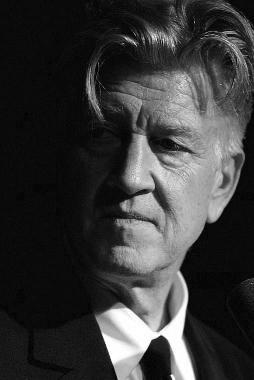
Twin Peaks co-creator David Lynch was originally scheduled to guest star in the episode.

"Dual Spires" is presented as an homage to Twin Peaks, and CNN writer Katie McLaughlin noted several allusions the episode makes to the series. In the beginning of the episode, there is a chocolate bunny on Shawn's desk. In Twin Peaks, Special Agent Dale Cooper (Kyle MacLachlan) delivered the famous line "Diane, I'm holding in my hands a small box of chocolate bunnies." Gus then asks, "Since when is the sound of opening and closing shades so disruptive that it needs to be alleviated?" The character Nadine Hurley in Twin Peaks attempted to patent her silent drape runner invention. Someone from a website by the name of UnderTheNail.com sends Shawn and Gus an e-mail that says, "Who killed Paula Merral?" Twin Peaks famed the catchphrase "Who Killed Laura Palmer?" (Paula Merral is an anagram of Laura Palmer.) The killer also purposely placed clues in his victims' fingernail beds. Ray Wise, who played Leland Palmer, also reprises his role as Father Westley, but when he arrives to rescue Shawn and Gus, his hair has gone white (which he attributes to a nun having failed to do his hair properly, and is a reference to Leland's hair going white from grief after Laura's death).

The "enhanced" video states that there are 724 references to Twin Peaks in the episode. Among them, Jack Smith wears an eye patch and a red suit and dances oddly, referencing not only "One Eyes Jacks" brothel and the aforementioned Nadine Hurley, but a dream sequence in Peaks, where a character known as the Man from Another Place wore a similar suit and danced in a bizarre fashion. In the final scene Carlton is seen holding his hand up and stating "that is a damn fine cup of cider". In the Twin Peaks pilot Agent Cooper holds his hand the same way and states "that is a damn fine cup of coffee." Additionally, Carlton is later holding a cup of coffee on its side, displaying that the coffee is now solid in a fashion mimicking the same action by Agent Cooper in the final episode. A seven-foot tall man (John DeSantis, known for playing Lurch in The New Addams Family) wearing a bow tie looks much like the Giant from Agent Cooper's dream (who was originally played by Carel Struycken, Lurch in the Addams Family films). Randy is seen at the end barking out the window like Bobby Briggs did to James Hurley in the holding cells. Bob Barker is seen dancing with a picture just as Leland Palmer did in Twin Peaks. The episode's end credits are accompanied by soap opera-type music and a shot of Paula's prom picture; Twin Peaks's credits did exactly the same thing with Laura's photo. The music is also very similar to the theme.

== Reception ==
According to the Nielsen ratings system, "Dual Spires" drew 3.543 million viewers, with a 2.2/4 share among all households, meaning that in the United States the episode was tuned into by roughly 2.2 percent of all television-equipped households and 4 percent of households watching television. The episode had a 1.3/4 share among those aged 18–49.

The episode received positive reviews from critics familiar with Twin Peaks. Jonah Krakow of IGN gave the episode a score of 9 out of 10, writing that it was "enjoyable enough on its own merits that I don't have to apologize for gushing over every single subtle nod to Twin Peaks." Although CNN's Katie McLaughlin was initially worried, her fears were quickly alleviated. McLaughlin stated that Psych did a "damn fine" tribute episode, and that she had fun finding all of the Twin Peaks references. Simon Abrams of The A.V. Club gave the episode a rating of C− on a scale of A+ to F. Commenting on reports that the episode has been in the works since the series' first season, Abrams wrote, "[it] speaks to how patently unnecessary "Dual Spires" is conceptually but also how potentially endearing it could be, too." JT Vaughn of Zap2it, however, gave the episode an A+ rating, writing, "It was just an absolutely brilliant episode, one which paid a loving homage to a classic television show while also being a damn fine episode in itself. Psych has been in great form since it returned, and long may it continue." In contrast, Starpulse writer Brittany Frederick, who was unfamiliar with Twin Peaks, enjoyed "Dual Spires" less than other episodes.
