= List of Psych characters =

The cast of Psych (left to right): Maggie Lawson as Juliet O'Hara, Corbin Bernsen as Henry Spencer, James Roday as Shawn Spencer, Kirsten Nelson as Chief Vick, Dulé Hill as Burton Guster, and Timothy Omundson as Carlton Lassiter.

This is a list of characters in the USA Network original comedy-drama television series Psych and subsequent sequel film series of the same name, the majority of which have been released to the Peacock streaming service. The principal cast of the franchise has remained the same throughout the television and film series. However, various recurring characters have appeared over the course of the franchise's run.

== Main characters ==
Character	Portrayed by	Television series seasons								Film series		
Character	Portrayed by	1	2	3	4	5	6	7	8	The Movie	Lassie Come Home	This Is Gus
Shawn Spencer	James Roday (Note: Credited as James Roday Rodriguez in the film series.)	Main	Main	Main	Main	Main	Main	Main	Main	Starring	Starring	Starring
Burton "Gus" Guster	Dulé Hill	Main	Main	Main	Main	Main	Main	Main	Main	Starring	Starring	Starring
Carlton "Lassie" Lassiter	Timothy Omundson	Main	Main	Main	Main	Main	Main	Main	Main	Starring	Starring	Starring
Lucinda Barry	Anne Dudek	Main (Note: Episode 1 of season 1 only)										
Henry Spencer	Corbin Bernsen	Main	Main	Main	Main	Main	Main	Main	Main	Starring	Starring	Starring
Juliet "Jules" O'Hara	Maggie Lawson	Main (Note: Credited from episode 2 of season 1 onwards)	Main	Main	Main	Main	Main	Main	Main	Starring	Starring	Starring
Chief Karen Vick	Kirsten Nelson	Recurring	Main	Main	Main	Main	Main	Main	Main	Starring	Starring	Starring
Selene	Jazmyn Simon									Supporting (Note: Credited after the main title sequence)	Supporting	Starring (Note: Credited in the main title sequence)

=== Lucinda Barry ===
Det. Lucinda Barry (Anne Dudek) is a detective who worked in the SBPD until it was revealed (by Shawn) that she was having a relationship with Lassiter. Barry appeared in the Pilot episode. Dudek did not return to the show for a main role, and the character was written out (without her presence) in the second episode, "Spellingg Bee". She was replaced by Juliet O'Hara, but was later mentioned by Lassiter in "Shawn Rescues Darth Vader" (6.01). Her death is implied in the episode "Santabarbaratown 2" (7.01) due to a shooting range tournament being named in her memory.

=== Henry Spencer ===
Henry Spencer (Corbin Bernsen) is Shawn's father, a retired SBPD detective. When Shawn was a child, he attempted to train him to follow in his footsteps, leading to his heightened observation skills. Though Henry disapproves of Shawn acting as a psychic, he begrudgingly helps out on cases from time to time. He is later offered a job as a consultant by Chief Vick during season four and accepts it in the season finale, "Mr. Yin Presents...".

=== Karen Vick ===
Karen Vick (Kirsten Nelson) is the interim police chief of the SBPD and is later promoted to chief. In the final season of the show, she is offered a job in San Francisco, taking Juliet with her as a new head detective and leaving Lassiter to become the new SBPD chief. It is unclear whether or not she believes Shawn to be psychic, but she often turns a blind eye and allows him to bend the law to solve cases.

=== Selene ===
Selene (Jazmyn Simon) is Gus' love interest and eventual wife, introduced in the Psych film series in a supporting role, before being promoted to a main role in the third film, Psych 3: This Is Gus (2021).

== Recurring characters ==
Character	Portrayed by	Occupation/Status	Psych television series seasons								Psych film series		
Character	Portrayed by	Occupation/Status	1	2	3	4	5	6	7	8	The Movie	Lassie Come Home	This Is Gus
Young Shawn	Liam James, Skyler Gisondo	Shawn Spencer as a child	Recurring	Recurring	Recurring	Recurring	Recurring	Recurring					
Young Gus	Carlos McCullers	Burton Guster as a child	Recurring	Recurring	Recurring	Recurring	Recurring	G					
Buzz McNab	Sage Brocklebank	SBPD Police Officer/SBPD Junior Detective/SBPD Head Detective	Recurring	Recurring	Recurring	Recurring	Recurring	Recurring	Recurring	Recurring	Supporting	Supporting	Supporting
Winifred "Winnie" Guster	Phylicia Rashad	Gus's mother		Guest	Guest					G			
William "Bill" Guster	Ernie Hudson, Keith David	Gus's father		Guest	Guest								
Madeleine Spencer	Cybill Shepherd	Police Psychiatrist/Shawn's mother		G	R		G		G				
Abigail Lytar	Rachael Leigh Cook	Teacher, Shawn's ex-girlfriend			G	R							
Mary Lightly	Jimmi Simpson	Criminal Expert (focused on Yin/Yang)			Guest	Guest	Guest		G		Supporting	Supporting	
Mr. Yang	Ally Sheedy	Serial Killer			Guest	Guest	Guest		G				
Pierre Despereaux	Cary Elwes	Art Thief				Guest	Guest	Guest		G			
Woodrow "Woody" Strode	Kurt Fuller	SBPD Coroner				Recurring	Recurring	Recurring	Recurring	Recurring	Supporting	Supporting	Supporting
Ewan O'Hara	John Cena	Juliet O'Hara's brother				G					S		
Father Peter Westley	Ray Wise	Priest				G	G						S
Curt Smith	Curt Smith	Singer-Songwriter					G		Guest	Guest			S
Marlowe Vicellio	Kristy Swanson	Lassiter's girlfriend/wife						Guest	Guest	Guest		Supporting	
Rachael	Parminder Nagra	Gus's former girlfriend							R				
Harris Trout	Anthony Michael Hall	SBPD Consultant and Interim Chief							Guest	Guest			
Betsy Brannigan	Mira Sorvino	SBPD Head Detective								R			

=== Young Shawn ===
Young Shawn (portrayed by Liam James and Skyler Gisondo in the majority of appearances) is the younger version of Shawn Spencer. He is almost always shown learning life lessons from his father, usually tying into the main events of the episode. The character usually appears in flashbacks to the late 1980s or early 1990s. Young Shawn first appeared in the pilot episode, and has appeared in nearly every episode for the first six seasons.

In "The Polarizing Express" (5.14), Young Shawn appears in adult Shawn's dream in 2010. The character makes light of the rotating actors in the role when Tony Cox comments that Shawn and his younger self look nothing alike. Young Shawn (portrayed by Skyler Gisondo) replies, "Well, we changed!" Then, looking at adult Shawn he says, "Sometimes from week to week, huh?," which adult Shawn confirms.

In "And Down the Stretch Comes Murder" (2.05), Young Shawn occurs in multiple flashbacks in which Shawn tries to find the culprit that shot a spitball at the teacher's head, ending in getting Jimmy (Bully) kicked out of school. Jimmy, now a horse jockey, returns in the beginning of the episode, to hire Psych to talk to his horse.

=== Young Gus ===
Young Gus (portrayed by Carlos McCullers II in the majority of appearances) is the younger version of Gus. He almost always appears with Young Shawn, occasionally learning life lessons from Henry as well. The character always appears in flashbacks to the late 1980s or early 1990s. Young Gus first appeared in "Spellingg Bee" (1.02) and has appeared in many episodes throughout the first six seasons.

=== Buzz McNab ===
Officer (Junior Detective season 8 finale episode), Head Detective (from Psych 2 onward) Buzz McNab (Sage Brocklebank) is a member of the SBPD, who often works with Detectives Lassiter and O'Hara, and occasionally Shawn and Gus. McNab is a naive, lovable cop who is always eager to please Lassiter, even though Lassiter doesn't always treat him well. He first appeared in the pilot episode, and has been shown occasionally. He has a wife, Francine, whom he marries in the first season, and a pet cat.

In the first-season episode "9 Lives" (1.05), McNab, in preparation for his wedding, calls a 1-800 stress-line, leading to almost becoming a victim in a murder. By the fourth season, he has already had two more brushes with death, including being wounded by an exploding mailbox in "Shawn Gets the Yips" (4.05) and knocked unconscious by a serial killer in "Mr. Yin Presents..." (4.16). In the seventh season episode "Deez Nups", It is revealed that McNab moonlights as a stripper for extra cash.

At the end of Season 7, he is fired by interim Chief Harris Trout. However, McNab is rehired in the seventh episode of Season 8 by Lassiter after he is promoted to SBPD Chief. In the series finale, SBPD Head Detective Betsy Brannigan chooses McNab to be her partner, and as a result he is promoted to Junior Detective. As of the second movie, McNab was promoted to Head Detective. (Note: Psych 2 depicts Buzz McNab as the first SBPD representative responding to the scene of a crime, which, coupled with the fact that Mira Sorvino's Betsy Braningan did not appear in either Psych 2 or 3, implies McNab has succeeded Branigan as the head detective for the SBPD.)

=== Winnie Guster ===
Winnifred "Winnie" Guster (Phylicia Rashad) is the mother of Gus and Joy Guster, and the wife of Bill Guster. She first appeared in "Gus's Dad May Have Killed an Old Guy" (2.10) followed by "Christmas Joy" (3.09) and in "A Nightmare on State Street" (8.09).

She first appeared in "Gus's Dad May Have Killed an Old Guy" (2.10), in which Shawn and Henry visit the Gusters for Christmas. She, along with her husband, was arrested for the murder of their neighbor. It was believed that they murdered him after it was revealed that she was being blackmailed for insurance fraud, and that Mr. Guster had been having an ongoing feud with the deceased. Shawn is determined to solve the case, due to their dislike of him. They blame him for being a negative influence on Gus. However, he solves the murder, revealing that it was not in any way connected to them. They are grateful, and finally accept Shawn.

Mrs. Guster returns in "Christmas Joy" (3.09). Shawn, Gus, and her daughter Joy all stay with the Gusters for the holidays. It is made known that she had used a bookie to place one bet, and had lost most of her savings. However, her family forgives her, and she forgives her family for all the mistakes that they had made as well.

She also makes a brief cameo appearance in "Nightmare on State Street", an eighth-season episode in which Gus relives the past week as a nightmare.

=== Bill Guster ===
William "Bill" Guster (Ernie Hudson and Keith David) is the father of Gus and Joy Guster, and the husband of Winnie Guster. He first appeared in "Gus's Dad May Have Killed an Old Guy" (2.10) and most recently in "Christmas Joy" (3.09).

He first appears in "Gus's Dad May Have Killed an Old Guy" (2.10), in which Shawn and Henry visit the Gusters for Christmas. He, along with his wife, is arrested for the murder of their neighbor. It is believed that they had murdered him after it was revealed that he was having an ongoing feud with the deceased. Shawn is determined to solve the case, due to their dislike of him. They blame him for being a negative influence on Gus. However, he solves the murder, revealing that it was not in any way connected to them. They are grateful, and finally accept Shawn.

Mr. Guster returns in "Christmas Joy" (3.09). Shawn, Gus, and his daughter Joy all stay with the Gusters for the holidays. It is made known that he had lost his job months earlier, and had been looking for a job during the days ever since. However, his family forgives him, and he forgives his family for all the mistakes that they had made as well.

=== Madeleine Spencer ===
Dr. Madeleine Spencer (Cybill Shepherd) is Shawn's mother and Henry's ex-wife. She has an eidetic memory, which she passed on to her son. She first appeared in a cameo appearance in "Shawn (and Gus) of the Dead" (2.16), and made her first major appearance in "Ghosts" (3.01).

In her first main appearance, "Ghosts" (3.01), she returns to Santa Barbara as a police psychologist. She explains to Shawn that she left his father in 1992 to pursue a job opportunity, a surprise to Shawn, who had always believed Henry left her. By her second appearance, in "Murder? ... Anyone? ... Anyone? ... Bueller?" (3.02), she has begun to spend more time with Henry; they even attend their son's high school reunion together.

In the third season finale, "An Evening with Mr. Yang" (3.16), she is kidnapped by Yang and almost killed by a car bomb. However, she is saved when Shawn identifies Yang and has her arrested. After the ordeal, she shares a brief kiss with Henry. In the sequel to "An Evening with Mr. Yang," "Mr. Yin Presents..." (4.16), she is revealed to be at a conference in New York, where she is safe from Yin's murderous rampage. However, she does not appear in the episode. She appears in "Yang 3 in 2D" (5.16), where it is revealed that Yang lived three blocks down from the Spencers, and that she had taken a picture of Shawn with Yang.

The casting of Shepherd in the role is notable as Moonlighting (starring Shepherd) was cited as an influence on Psych by its creator, Steve Franks.

=== Abigail Lytar ===
Abigail Lytar (Rachael Leigh Cook) is Shawn's ex-girlfriend. She is an elementary school teacher. She first appeared in "Murder? ... Anyone? ... Anyone? ... Bueller?" (3.02) and in "Mr. Yin Presents..." (4.16).

She first appears in "Murder? ... Anyone? ... Anyone? ... Bueller?" (3.02) at Shawn and Gus's high school reunion. It is revealed that she had been stood-up by Shawn at a high school dance, when he left her standing alone on a pier. Together, they solve the murder of one of their former classmates. In "An Evening with Mr. Yang" (3.16), Gus accuses Shawn of not being able to keep a steady relationship. He then proceeds to call Abigail, immediately asking her on a date. Over the course of the episode, however, he is forced to keep pushing the time back as he struggles to capture Yang. Finally, the two share their first real date at a drive-in theater in Gus's car (though Gus stays in the backseat the entire time).

Abigail returns in the fourth season in the episode "He Dead" (4.02), wanting to meet Henry for the first time. However, Shawn attempts to prevent it, claiming that his relationship with his father is already strained. Despite his attempts, the two finally meet, and get along very well, much to Shawn's surprise. Abigail returned again in "Bollywood Homicide" (4.06), in which Shawn invites her to a crime scene. When Lassiter embarrasses Shawn in front of Abigail, Shawn becomes determined to solve the case, and eventually does. In the summer finale, "You Can't Handle This Episode" (4.10), Abigail reveals to Shawn that she is moving to Uganda for six months, and that she wants to put their relationship on hold until she visits in February.

When Abigail returns from Uganda in "Mr. Yin Presents..." (4.16), she is met with an unwelcome surprise. Upon her arrival at the airport, Officer McNab picks her up, due to Shawn's preoccupation with catching Yin. Immediately, McNab is drugged, and Abigail is kidnapped by Yin. After Yin ties her to the bottom of the pier (where Shawn stood her up in high school), Shawn is issued an ultimatum: rescue Juliet or rescue Abigail. He chooses Abigail, and barely succeeds in saving her life. However, immediately afterward, she tells Shawn she can't take the stress of his job any longer, and breaks up with him. However, she did tell Shawn to call her if he ever gave up "chasing psychos."

=== Mary Lightly ===
Dr. Mary Lightly III (Jimmi Simpson) was a criminal psychologist who was obsessed with the Yin/Yang cases. He also had a disdain for racquetball because he "would not wear short pants". He first appeared in "An Evening with Mr. Yang" (3.16) and last in "Psych: The Musical" (7.15).

In his very first scene, he is forced to explain his name, saying that his "father was named Mary, his father before him was named Mary, and his father before him was named Craig". He has very odd quirks, including a "creepy handshake." After studying the Yang case for 13 years, he returned to Santa Barbara when Yang resurfaced. He provided several insights that were invaluable in catching Yang and bringing her to justice.

In "Mr. Yin Presents..." (4.16), he visits Shawn and Gus, revealing that he never left Santa Barbara, and reveals his theory that Yang was not working alone. He believes that a Yin exists, and that he is even more murderous than Yang. After following Yin's clues, Shawn and Gus are led to believe that Mary is, in fact, Yin. However, after following him to (what appears to be) an abandoned building, they see him stabbed, just like Martin Balsam in Alfred Hitchcock's Psycho. He dies in Shawn's arms. In the final scenes of the episode, Shawn, Gus, and Mary's mother are shown attending his racquetball-themed funeral.

In "Yang 3 in 2D" (5.16), the team discovers a videotape made by Mary days before his murder. It mostly consisted of random poetry and thoughts (including questioning the popularity of One Tree Hill), but eventually included valuable insight to the Yin/Yang relationship. Mary stated that he believed Yin would be jealous of Yang's popularity, and that Yin would attempt to take "revenge of the highest malevolence". During the video he refers to himself as "Marion", which is probably his full name.

Mary makes a brief appearance in "Psych: The Musical" (7.15) in an after-death sequence. In a duet between himself and Yang, he implies that Yang will probably not get into heaven. Yang suggests he might advocate on her behalf, and he says he knows someone who knows someone who might be able to help.

Mary also makes another brief appearance in Psych: The Movie in Shawn's dream, during which he performs an acoustic version of "Allison Road" by Gin Blossoms. Shawn joins in, and they are later joined by Juliet (as Holographic Leia) and Gus (as Prince). It isn't until near the end of the episode that Shawn realizes Mary was trying to give him a hint about who the villain of the movie is: Allison Cowley.

Subsequently, in Psych 2: Lassie Come Home, Mary appears in another dream sequence. After Shawn finds out about Juliet's supposed pregnancy with his child, Mary is seen as a baby whose actions and requests play to a certain degree on Shawn's insecurities about fatherhood, but the dream serves as a crucial segue to the eventual resolution as to who was responsible for attacking Lassie.

=== Mr. Yang ===
Mr. Yang (Ally Sheedy) was a serial killer who murdered her first victim in 1995. That year, she killed six people after a game of cat-and-mouse with each of them. Over the next 14 years, she killed two others but was still not caught, nor her identity revealed. She appeared first in "An Evening with Mr. Yang" (3.16), then again in "Psych: The Musical" (7.15).

In "An Evening with Mr. Yang" (3.16), she directs her game at Shawn Spencer. She first kidnaps Shawn and Gus's waitress and holds her hostage. After leaving several cryptic clues for Shawn, the hostage is finally returned, but replaced with Shawn's mother, Madeleine. After strapping a bomb to Madeleine, Yang sits and watches as the police swarm a drive-in theater looking for her. Shawn finds her car, and she finally comes face-to-face with her target. She reveals to Shawn that she is going to write a book about them, and is finally arrested.

When Shawn and Gus speak to Mary (a psychologist who helped bring Yang to justice) a year later in "Mr. Yin Presents..." (4.16), he reveals that it would be impossible for Yang to work alone, and proposes that she was working with a Yin. He discerns this from Yang's book, entitled From Serial Dater to Serial Killer: How Murder Kept Me Skinny. Shawn, Gus, and Mary visit Yang in her cell at an asylum. While there, Yang admits to working with a Yin. She says, "If you think I'm sick, you ain't seen nothing yet."

In "Yang 3 in 2D" (5.16), it is revealed that Yang had lived only three blocks from the Spencers, where she had her picture taken with Shawn by Madeleine. After briefly letting Yang out of the asylum to help capture Yin, Shawn and Gus discover that Yin is actually Yang's father, and that Yin had committed each of the murders attributed to Yang (including the attempted murders in "An Evening with Mr. Yang"). They watch helplessly as Yang murders her father for trying to harm Shawn; she is subsequently taken back into custody.

Yang's sexual orientation is uncertain. Yin says she "developed an unhealthy crush" on Shawn in "Yang 3 in 2D." However, Yang says in Mr. Yin Presents..." that she "has the googly eyes" for her "lady guard friend," the woman in charge of escorting visitors to her cell. Yang also says in "Yang 3 in 2D" that "hosting The View and making out with Elisabeth Hasselbeck is impossible."

In "Psych: The Musical" (7.15), Yang becomes the main informant regarding an escaped murderer being pursued by the police. She is later stabbed to death by the murderer after saving Shawn's life. This is followed by an after-death duet between her and Mary, in which the latter reveals that she probably won't get into heaven, but that he knows someone who knows someone who may make an exception.

=== Pierre Despereaux ===
Pierre Despereaux (Cary Elwes) is an extremely elusive international art thief. He first see Despereaux on the slopes "Extradition: British Columbia" (4.01), when Shawn and Gus travel to Canada for a summer ski trip. Shawn recognizes Despereaux after first seeing him on Lassiter's board of criminals in his apartment "Lassie Did a Bad, Bad Thing" (3.11). Shawn shouts his name and causes him to flee, leading to a high-speed ski chase scene in which it is shown that Despereaux is a much better skier than Shawn and Gus. Despereaux then proceeds to "steal" an expensive baroque necklace, leaving a still-burning expensive blonde cigarette in the owner's ashtray, his calling card. Shawn realizes that Despereaux is still in the building and chases him to the roof, but Despereaux makes an impressive base jump from the building and leaves Shawn looking foolish when the RCMP, Lassiter, and Juliet get to the roof and find Shawn and Gus alone. Despereaux finds out about a restaurant where Shawn has dinner reservations and surprises him there, and taunts him by writing out his plans for the rest of his stay in Canada, saying he's never been anywhere close to being caught and he wants to make it more interesting for himself, before promptly slipping away once more.

Following Despereaux's list, Shawn seeks out the Manet he is planning to steal, but is foiled once again when they arrive to find that the Manet has already been stolen. Endeavoring to get one step ahead of Despereaux, Shawn figures out where his hotel room is and sneaks in, knowing that Despereaux uses the names of famous artists for aliases and seeing a room booked to Edgar Degas. Shawn goes to rifle through Despereaux's things and then plans to wait for him dramatically in the dark, but Despereaux already has the drop on him and is doing what Shawn was planning to do; as soon as Shawn finishes describing his plan to Gus on the phone, Despereaux flips the lamp on dramatically, revealing that he has been sitting there the whole time with a smug smile. Shawn clutches a pillow to himself, afraid Despereaux will shoot him, but Despereaux gives a speech about the depressingly messy state of murders these days, saying he misses when murders were done with "panache" and finesse. He begins packing his things, and Shawn flinches when he grabs a pair of shoes, thinking that it's his gun; Despereaux replies, "no, this is my gun," dramatically flourishing his weapon and pointing it at Shawn, who flinches again. However, Despereaux goes on to explain that Shawn has nothing on him but his word, and furthermore that Shawn is proving quite useful to him, before directing Shawn to leave his room.

Shawn then chases down the final tip on Despereaux's to-do list—that he will treat himself "like a king"—and realizes he is going to steal a crown, but is baffled once more when he finds that the crown was gone long before they got there. This is the final piece in the puzzle for Shawn, though, and he realizes that Despereaux never gets caught because owners in financial distress make it possible for him to steal the items so that they may collect the insurance money, making what he does more insurance fraud than anything else. Shawn then finds the private plane in which Despereaux plans to leave and explains how he figured it all out to him, stating that he is disappointed in Despereaux because he thought he was so cool but he's really just a fraud. Sighing, Despereaux takes out his gun and explains, "It's a pity, but now I'm afraid I'm going to have to hurt you." Naturally, though, the police show up and arrest Despereaux. Grinning as he is taken away, Despereaux turns to Shawn and tells him, "you know, I have often fantasized about escaping prison."

In Despereaux's return "Extradition II: The Actual Extradition Part", Shawn and Gus return to Vancouver on the request and tab of Despereaux just before he is to be extradited by Lassiter. Despereaux wants to prove he is the "Greatest Thief That Ever Lived" and escapes from prison to commit an elaborate art theft from the Canadian crown prosecutor's house. But after the job is done he is framed for the death of the crown prosecutor. Shawn eventually discovers it was Despereaux's girlfriend who set him up.

For round 3, "Indiana Shawn and the Temple of the Kinda Crappy, Rusty Old Dagger", a valuable shipment of artifacts is stolen from a museum. Shawn needs "professional" help in getting them back. So he calls in Pierre to help them catch the thief who stole the shipment. The thief was actually after a dagger that opens the door to a secret stash of paintings. Throughout the investigation, Despereaux is forced to fake his own death in order to avoid prison. Then, along with Shawn and Gus, he uncovers the art, revealing many seemingly worthless paintings. He later steals one of these and removes the paint, revealing a Rembrandt underneath. The SBPD now believes him to be deceased, though we know this is false, finally making Pierre Despereaux the world class thief that both he and Shawn have always envisioned.

Lock, Stock, Some Smoking Barrels and Burton Guster's Goblet of Fire In "Lock, Stock, Some Smoking Barrels and Burton Guster's Goblet of Fire", Despereaux calls Shawn and Gus to England, where he asks Shawn to pose as a getaway driver in a sting to stop a heist. Despereaux claims he is really Interpol agent Royston Staley, and that Despereaux has been his deep cover identity all along, but Gus is still skeptical. Shawn and Gus discover that the entire staff turned over recently at Interpol, so no one has known Staley for long, and no one has ever seen the alleged agent who hired him, so Shawn and Gus suspect that Staley is a fake and Despereaux is up to his old tricks. Their investigation shows that neither Royston Staley nor his mysterious Dutch superior seem to exist, and they are certain their suspicions were confirmed.

When they are called to do the heist, the criminal crew picks up Despereaux as the final member of the crew, though he still claims to be undercover, but Shawn and Gus suspect he just wants the plunder for himself. Just before the heist begins, Shawn receives a phone call with more information that makes it sound probable that Despereuax is actually Royston Staley as he claims to be, since Interpol would have erased his identity when he went undercover and Royston Staley did exist at one point until his identity was apparently erased by someone at a really high level, and so he feels wrong for having doubted him (and for getting one of the other agents in trouble). When they arrive and realize the heist has already gone down, Shawn and Gus are tied up by the other robbers, who plan to kill them to make it look like a heist gone bad. While they are tied up, they see Despereaux sneaking away with the jewels from the heist, and are convinced that he is an untrustworthy criminal once again.

However, he returns and dramatically saves Shawn and Gus. Soon Interpol arrives, complete with the mysterious Dutch boss who no one but "Staley" has seen before. However, a royal was killed during the heist, so the Dutch man suspends "Staley", and Shawn and Gus watch as he clears his things out of his office (including the dagger from "Indiana Shawn and the Temple of the Kinda Crappy, Rusty Old Dagger", as "Staley" admits he didn't always color inside the lines), and they finally accept that he is truly Royston Staley, an undercover agent from Interpol.

However, later, Shawn and Gus go to a pub, where they see the man who was supposed to be "Staley"s superior on the streets as a beggar. Gus concludes that this means he had been a fake all along, and Despereaux had infiltrated Interpol, hiring the beggar to play his boss to strengthen his ruse. Shawn suggests that, to the contrary, the Dutch agent could merely be undercover as a beggar in order to uncover some sort of crime ring and Despereaux's story could still be true. Gus replies that it's ridiculous since beggars don't have crime rings. Shawn then suggests (in a way that is true for the viewer as well) that they can choose what to believe--whether Despereaux is really a master criminal who infiltrated Interpol, or whether he really was Staley the undercover agent, leaving the episode, and the man, with an ever-lingering air of mystery.

=== Woody Strode ===
Dr. Woodrow "Woody" Strode (Kurt Fuller) is the quirky coroner for the Santa Barbara Police Department. He shares many character traits with Shawn and the two immediately click. He first appeared in "High Top Fade Out" (4.07) and then became a frequently recurring character. In "Shawn 2.0" (5.08), he reveals that he had a wife. Shawn soon points out that she was cheating on him with her personal trainer, and Woody responds that he had approved of the affair. When Shawn points out other men in her life, Woody states that he had not approved those particular men. In "Autopsy Turvy" (6.14), it is revealed that in medical school he dated a mortuary cosmetologist named Grace Larsen (Glenne Headly). He is apparently wanted in the Philippines, as made evident in "Dead Bear Walking"' (5.15). While being filmed for a documentary by Lassiter's sister, he attempts to alter his voice for "legal purposes."

=== Father Peter Westley ===
Father Peter Westley (Ray Wise) is a priest at a Catholic church and Shawn and Gus' former Sunday School teacher. He first appeared in "The Devil is in the Details... and the Upstairs Bedroom" (4.04) when he was suspected of the murder of a young college girl. However, he is not the killer. He returned in "Dual Spires" (5.12), a homage to Wise's previous television series Twin Peaks, in which he saves the lives of Shawn and Gus. He is also said to have blessed a bottle of holy water over the phone for Gus in "This Episode Sucks" (6.03). In Psych 3: This Is Gus, Father Westley officiates Gus and Selene's marriage over FaceTime.

=== Declan Rand ===
Declan Rand (Nestor Carbonell) is a fake criminal profiler who briefly dated Juliet. With the exception of Gus, Madeleine and Henry, he is the only character who knows Shawn is not psychic at the time of his appearance. Declan first appears in "Shawn 2.0" (5.08), in which he was hired by the SBPD to a case Shawn and Gus were already working. He quickly surpassed them, and was given all the credit for the case. Later, however, they discover that he is not really a criminal profiler; he is just extremely rich and is working "for fun." Declan is aware that Shawn is not really a psychic, while Shawn is aware that Declan is not really a criminal profiler. Declan, like Shawn, soon falls for Juliet. Just as Shawn goes to confess to Juliet that he is not really a psychic and ask her out, Declan confesses that he is not really a criminal profiler. Juliet appreciates his honesty, and begins to date him.

In "One, Maybe Two, Ways Out" (5.09), Shawn and Gus need Declan's assistance in another case. He agrees, but must confess to Juliet every time he helps, to Shawn and Gus's vehement protests. After discovering that Declan is taking Juliet on a two-week vacation, Shawn tells Gus how he feels about Juliet. Juliet overhears everything he says. While visiting Declan, Shawn ends up alone with Juliet, and she kisses him. Declan reenters the room, and Shawn leaves. By the next episode, "Extradition II: The Actual Extradition Part" (5.10), it is revealed that Juliet has broken up with Declan.

=== Marlowe Viccellio Lassiter ===
Marlowe Viccellio Lassiter (Kristy Swanson) is introduced as a murder suspect in "This Episode Sucks" (6.03), in which the SBPD discovers that she has been stealing blood in order to help her dying brother. She is then sent to prison, but not before creating a connection with Lassie. Their relationship grows throughout the sixth season and she appears later in "Let's Doo-Wop It Again" (6.13). She and Lassiter were engaged (7.06) and were married in "Deez Nups" (7.07). In "S.E.I.Z.E The Day" (8.02), she revealed to Lassiter that she was pregnant.

In "Shawn and Gus Truck Things Up" (8.07), Marlowe gives birth to her daughter Lily, in the back of Shawn and Gus's "Smash & Grab" food truck. In the series finale, "The Break Up" (8.10), Lassiter tells Marlowe to put the baby on the phone and says "Hi, Lily. This is your daddy."

=== Rachel ===
Rachel (Parminder Nagra) is Gus' girlfriend during season 7. She is British and has a son, Maximus (Mateen Devji), from a previous relationship. Despite Rachel's sweetness and dedication to Gus, he struggles with the notion of starting an instant family. When Gus finally starts to grow close to them, Rachel and Maximus move back to England. She and Gus briefly try to maintain a long-distance relationship, but Rachel ultimately breaks up with him.

=== Harris Trout ===
Harris Trout (Anthony Michael Hall) is a special police consultant whose job is to increase efficiency within the department. He first appears in “No Trout About It” (7.14), having been hired by the mayor to investigate an apparently bungled case Shawn and Gus took of a man who hired them to find his murderer (he had been fatally poisoned). Upon conclusion of Trout's investigation, he suspends Chief Vick for six months due to her failure to run the department appropriately. Trout himself subsequently is appointed as the new interim chief of the Santa Barbara Police Department and immediately ends the use of psychics, demotes Lassiter from head detective to patrol officer, and promotes Juliet to interim head detective. Following that promotion, Juliet still defers to Lassiter when she can, and consistently invites him to help with her cases.

In “Someone’s Got a Woody” (8.04), Trout oversees hostage negotiations with a suspected murderer who has taken SBPD coroner Dr. Woody Strode hostage in the morgue. After Lassiter, Jules, Shawn and Gus ignore Trout's unreasonable and dangerous orders (which would have led to mass casualties, including Woody himself), Trout attempts to fire both Juliet and Lassiter and symbolically fire Shawn and Gus (as they were never hired in the first place), but is instead fired by the mayor for his reckless hostage techniques.

In "C. O. G. Blocked" (8.05), during a dialogue exchange between Lassiter and Shawn, it is revealed that, following his firing, Trout was institutionalized for court-ordered psychiatric evaluation due to his reckless behavior, rash decisions, and unjustified anger. Trout's firing and mental state led the city to reverse his prior decisions, including Lassiter's demotion, O'Hara's interim promotion, and the SBPD ban on hiring consultants, which allows Shawn and Gus to return to employment at the SBPD.

=== Betsy Brannigan ===
Betsy Brannigan (Mira Sorvino) is a detective who replaces Carlton Lassiter as Head Detective of the SBPD upon his promotion to Chief. Betsy is sweet, outgoing, and quirky, yet despite her bubbly demeanor, Brannigan is an incredibly skilled investigator and a badass. She spends her down time at work crafting and knitting, yet also carries dual Colt 1911's which she has named. Lassiter is initially wary of Brannigan, but she wins him over with her strong police work and passion. Despite her assertion that she works better alone, Lassiter insists she get a partner; Brannigan chooses Buzz McNab, as she believes training the naive junior detective will be a "fun project."

== Minor characters ==
The following are characters appearing in multiple episodes in small roles.

- Officer Martha Allen (Patricia Idlette) is a desk sergeant with the SBPD. She believes Shawn can speak to her dead grandmother. She appeared in the pilot episode and "Woman Seeking Dead Husband: Smokers Okay, No Pets" (1.04).
- Corporal Robert Mackintosh (Peter Oldring) is a Canadian police officer who first appeared in "Extradition: British Columbia" (4.01). Due to events that transpired in the episode, he was demoted to traffic duty. He returned in "Extradition II: The Actual Extradition Part" (5.10), in which it is revealed that he has been re-promoted.
- Deputy Commissioner Ed Dykstra (Ed Lauter) is a Canadian law-enforcement officer, and Mackintosh's superior. He first appeared in "Extradition: British Columbia" (4.01) and returned in "Extradition II: The Actual Extradition Part" (5.10).
- Gina Repach (Sarah Edmondson) is a former girlfriend of Shawn. She appeared in "Shawn Takes a Shot in the Dark" (4.09), in which he called her in an attempt to save his own life. However, she hung up on him, angry that he would call after dumping her. She later appeared in "Shawn 2.0" (5.08) when Shawn cannot find a date to a friend's wedding.
- Ken Wong (Jerry Shea) is Psych's former assistant. He appeared in "Romeo and Juliet and Juliet" (5.01), in which he was immediately fired due to monetary problems. He later appeared again in "In Plain Fright" (5.11) when he is again coerced to work for Psych for free.
- Mr. Yin (Christopher Turner and Peter Weller) was Yang's counterpart and former partner, who appeared in "Mr. Yin Presents..." (4.16) and "Yang 3 in 2D" (5.16). Yin's existence is uncovered by Mary Lightly, who proposes that Yang had a partner during the events of "An Evening with Mr. Yang" (3.16). Yin, who is obsessed with the films of Alfred Hitchcock, begins committing murders taken directly out of a Hitchcock film. Yin ultimately forces Shawn to choose between catching him or saving Abigail. Shawn picks Abigail and Yin escapes; he is seen stroking a picture of Yang with Young Shawn. In "Yang 3 in 2D" (5.16), it is revealed that Yin is actually Professor Karl Rotmensen and is Yang's father; he had committed all of the murders attributed to her. He has also taken on a new apprentice (Allison Cowley), to replace Yang, but she is arrested by Juliet and Yang ultimately kills her father to save Shawn.
- Officer Dobson is an officer who has been floating unobserved in the background of the SBPD for the eight years of the show and is often the one who Lasiter yells for to get things done. Despite being named in all eight seasons, he is only seen on-screen during the series finale, as portrayed by Val Kilmer. (Note: In-show, Shawn had often referenced Val Kilmer as a personal hero of his.)

== Notable guest stars ==
- Kevin Alejandro ("Ferry Tale")
- Mädchen Amick ("Indiana Shawn and the Temple of the Kinda Crappy, Rusty Old Dagger")
- John Amos ("Meat Is Murder, But Murder Is Also Murder")
- Anthony Anderson ("True Grits")
- Curtis Armstrong ("The Old and the Restless")
- Tom Arnold ("A Touch of Sweevil")
- Dana Ashbrook ("Dual Spires")
- Mackenzie Astin ("Tuesday the 17th")
- Diedrich Bader ("The Tao of Gus")
- Diora Baird ("The Tao of Gus")
- Christine Baranski ("He Dead")
- Malcolm Barrett ("Zero to Murder in Sixty Seconds")
- Justine Bateman ("Tuesday the 17th")
- Garcelle Beauvais ("Dead Air")
- Jim Beaver ("High Noon-ish")
- Doron Bell Jr. ("We’d Like to Thank the Academy")
- Rob Benedict ("True Grits")
- The Big Show ("Lassie Jerky")
- Bre Blair ("Shawn vs. the Red Phantom")
- Wade Boggs ("Dead Man’s Curve Ball")
- Katrina Bowden ("Scary Sherry: Bianca's Toast")
- John Ross Bowie ("Weekend Warriors")
- April Bowlby ("Dead Bear Walking")
- Wayne Brady ("Shawn and the Real Girl")
- James Brolin ("High Noon-ish")
- Yvette Nicole Brown ("A Touch of Sweevil")
- Jere Burns ("Disco Didn't Die. It Was Murdered!")
- Dean Cameron ("A Nightmare on State Street")
- Bruce Campbell ("A Nightmare on State Street")
- John Cena ("You Can't Handle This Episode", Psych: The Movie)
- Faune Chambers ("Christmas Joy")
- Jay Chandrasekhar ("Bollywood Homicide")
- Claire Coffee ("Weekend Warriors")
- Gary Cole ("Gus Walks Into a Bank")
- Catherine E. Coulson ("Dual Spires")
- Tony Cox ("The Polarizing Express")
- Tim Curry ("American Duos")
- Lolita Davidovich ("Santabarbaratown")
- Don S. Davis ("Pilot")
- Cristián de la Fuente ("American Duos")
- Amanda Detmer ("Black and Tan: A Crime of Fashion")
- William Devane ("Viagra Falls")
- Brooke D'Orsay ("Six Feet Under the Sea")
- Brad Dourif ("Shawn, Interrupted")
- Nora Dunn ("In Plain Fright")
- Rob Estes ("Santabarbaratown")
- Jeff Fahey ("Daredevils!")
- Corey Feldman ("This Episode Sucks")
- Sherilyn Fenn ("Dual Spires")
- Jennifer Finnigan ("Neil Simon’s Lover’s Retreat")
- Sutton Foster ("A Nightmare on State Street")
- Lee Garlington ("Chivalry Is Not Dead... But Someone Is")
- Gina Gershon ("American Duos")
- Danny Glover ("Dead Man’s Curve Ball")
- Louis Gossett Jr. ("Heeeeere’s Lassie")
- Milena Govich ("Earth, Wind and... Wait for It")
- Jon Gries ("One, Maybe Two, Ways Out")
- Greg Grunberg ("Shawn and the Real Girl")
- Ernie Grunwald ("Death Is in the Air")
- Tony Hale ("Neil Simon’s Lover’s Retreat")
- Anthony Michael Hall
- Philip Baker Hall ("Dis-Lodged")
- Van Hansis ("This Episode Sucks")
- John Hawkes ("Shawn Takes a Shot in the Dark")
- Glenne Headly ("Autopsy Turvy")
- Howard Hesseman ("And Down the Stretch Comes Murder")
- John Michael Higgins ("Chivalry Is Not Dead... But Someone Is")
- Michael Hogan ("The Head, the Tail, the Whole Damn Episode")
- Scott Holroyd ("He Dead")
- C. Thomas Howell ("One, Maybe Two, Ways Out")
- Steve Howey ("Thrill Seekers and Hell-Raisers")
- Pascale Hutton ("Pilot")
- Stoney Jackson ("True Grits")
- Mickie James ("Talk Derby to Me")
- Vinnie Jones ("Lock, Stock, Some Smoking Barrels and Burton Guster's Goblets of Fire")
- Stacy Keibler ("Thrill Seekers and Hell-Raisers")
- Val Kilmer ("The Break-Up")
- Richard Kind ("From the Earth to the Starbucks")
- Suzanne Krull ("The Tao of Gus")
- Rob LaBelle ("In Plain Fright")
- Stephen Lang ("Shawn Gets the Yips")
- Ted Lange ("Disco Didn't Die. It Was Murdered!")
- Dan Lauria ("Poker? I Barely Know Her")
- Sheryl Lee ("Dual Spires")
- Robyn Lively ("Dual Spires")
- Christopher Lloyd ("100 Clues")
- Ed Lover ("Last Night Gus")
- Jessica Lucas ("Last Night Gus")
- Jane Lynch ("There Might Be Blood")
- Ralph Macchio ("We’d Like to Thank the Academy")
- Joshua Malina ("Let's Get Hairy")
- Cheech Marin ("Let’s Doo-Wop It Again")
- Chi McBride ("Ferry Tale")
- Christopher McDonald ("Ghosts")
- Ryan McDonald ("Dual Spires")
- Malcolm McDowell ("Shawn Rescues Darth Vader")
- Bruce McGill ("Earth, Wind and... Wait for It")
- Ted McGinley ("Six Feet Under the Sea")
- Joey McIntyre ("The Amazing Psych-Man and Tap Man, Issue #2")
- Kate Micucci ("Autopsy Turvy")
- Ivana Miličević ("Autopsy Turvy")
- The Miz ("Shawn and the Real Girl")
- Meredith Monroe ("Shawn 2.0")
- Garrett Morris ("100 Clues")
- Oliver Muirhead ("Santabarbaratown 2")
- Martin Mull ("100 Clues")
- Brian Doyle Murray ("The Old and the Restless")
- David Naughton ("Let's Get Hairy")
- Judd Nelson ("Death Is in the Air")
- Larisa Oleynik ("Let's Get Hairy")
- Meghan Ory ("Viagra Falls")
- Kelly Overton ("There Might Be Blood")
- Robert Patrick ("You Can't Handle This Episode")
- Amanda Pays ("Black and Tan: A Crime of Fashion")
- Mekhi Phifer ("Let’s Doo-Wop It Again")
- Lou Diamond Phillips ("Psy vs. Psy")
- Tony Plana ("No Country for Two Old Men")
- Franka Potente ("One, Maybe Two, Ways Out")
- Jason Priestley ("Neil Simon’s Lover’s Retreat")
- Freddie Prinze Jr. ("Not Even Close... Encounters")
- Keshia Knight Pulliam ("The Polarizing Express")
- Sendhil Ramamurthy ("Bollywood Homicide")
- John Rhys-Davies ("Indiana Shawn and the Temple of the Kinda Crappy, Rusty Old Dagger")
- Deon Richmond ("The Break-Up")
- Molly Ringwald ("Shawn, Interrupted")
- Adam Rodriguez ("Shawn and Gus in Drag (Racing)")
- Michael Rooker ("Shawn Takes a Shot in the Dark")
- Saul Rubinek ("Lights, Camera... Homicidio")
- Alan Ruck ("Gus Walks Into a Bank")
- Sara Rue ("Heeeeere’s Lassie")
- Mercedes Ruehl ("Scary Sherry: Bianca's Toast")
- Jeri Ryan ("The Head, the Tail, the Whole Damn Episode")
- Amanda Schull ("Santabarbaratown")
- Brent Sexton ("High Noon-ish")
- Sarah Shahi ("Thrill Seekers and Hell-Raisers")
- William Shatner ("In for a Penny..." and "Heeeeere's Lassie")
- Jonathan Silverman ("Truer Lies")
- Jean Smart ("Chivalry Is Not Dead... But Someone Is")
- Curt Smith ("Shawn 2.0", "100 Clues" , "Nightmare on State Street", Psych 3: This Is Gus]
- Kurtwood Smith ("Forget Me Not")
- Kevin Sorbo ("Bounty Hunters!")
- Todd Stashwick ("Ghosts")
- French Stewart ("Autopsy Turvy")
- Peter Stormare ("Someone's Got a Woody")
- Mena Suvari ("Yang 3 in 2D", Psych: The Movie)
- George Takei ("Shawn vs. the Red Phantom")
- Jeffrey Tambor ("No Country for Two Old Men" and "Right Turn or Left for Dead")
- Kenan Thompson ("High Top Fade-Out")
- Tony Todd ("High Top Fade-Out")
- Keegan Connor Tracy ("Cloudy... Chance of Murder")
- Michael Trucco ("Dead Man’s Curve Ball")
- Beverley Turner ("Mr. Yin Presents...")
- Steve Valentine ("100 Clues")
- Jacob Vargas ("The Polarizing Express")
- Lenny Von Dohlen ("Dual Spires")
- Arnold Vosloo ("A Very Juliet Episode")
- Polly Walker ("Shawn Rescues Darth Vader")
- Lesley Ann Warren ("100 Clues")
- Kerry Washington ("There's Something About Mira")
- Carl Weathers ("Viagra Falls")
- Steven Weber ("The Greatest Adventure in the History of Basic Cable")
- Michael Weston ("Cloudy... Chance of Murder", "Remake A.K.A. Cloudy... With a Chance of Improvement")
- Frank Whaley ("Who Ya Gonna Call?")
- Jaleel White ("High Top Fade-Out," "Let's Doo-Wop It Again")
- Christopher Wiehl ("Any Given Friday Night at 10pm, 9pm Central")
- Ashley Williams ("Forget Me Not")
- Mykelti Williamson ("Any Given Friday Night at 10pm, 9pm Central")
- Shannon Woodward ("Scary Sherry: Bianca's Toast")
- Calum Worthy ("If You're So Smart, Then Why Are You Dead?")
- William Zabka ("A Nightmare on State Street")
- Billy Zane ("The Break Up")
