= Psych season 3 =

Psych
- Season 3
- The DVD cover of the third season of Psych
- Starring: James Roday; Dulé Hill; Timothy Omundson; Maggie Lawson; Kirsten Nelson; Corbin Bernsen
- No. of episodes: 16

Release
- Original network: USA Network
- Original release: July 18, 2008 – February 20, 2009

Season chronology
- ← Previous; Season 2 Next → Season 4

The third season of Psych originally aired in the United States on USA Network from July 18, 2008 to February 20, 2009. It consisted of 16 episodes. James Roday, Dulé Hill, Timothy Omundson, Maggie Lawson, Corbin Bernsen, and Kirsten Nelson reprised their roles as the main characters. James Roday portrayed Shawn Spencer, a fake psychic detective who periodically consults for the Santa Barbara police department. A DVD of the season was released on July 21, 2009.

== Production ==
Steve Franks continued to serve as showrunner for the third season. "I Know, You Know," performed by The Friendly Indians, continued to serve as the theme song for the series, though the Christmas-themed version used for the previous season's "Gus's Dad May Have Killed an Old Guy" was used again for "Christmas Joy."

Mel Damski returned to the series to direct three episodes, while John Badham and Stephen Surjik returned to direct two each. Returning to direct one episode each were Steve Franks, John Landis, Eric Laneuville, and Tim Matheson. New directors for the season, directing one episode each, were Jay Chandrasekhar, Martha Coolidge, Michael McMurray, Steve Miner, and series star James Roday.

Andy Berman and Steve Franks returned to write three episodes each, while Josh Bycel, Anupam Nigam, Saladin K. Patterson, and James Roday wrote two. Tim Meltreger returned to pen one episode. New writers for the season included Kell Cahoon, who wrote two episodes, and Victoria Walker, who wrote one.

== Cast ==
James Roday continued to play fake psychic detective Shawn Spencer. Burton "Gus" Guster returned, portrayed by Dulé Hill. Timothy Omundson returned as Head Detective Carlton "Lassie" Lassiter, while Maggie Lawson continued to portray Juliet "Jules" O'Hara. Corbin Bernsen was kept on as Henry Spencer. Kirsten Nelson continued to receive star billing as Karen Vick, while her character was promoted to permanent Chief of the SBPD.

Sage Brocklebank continued in his role as Officer Buzz McNab in six episodes. Liam James portrayed young Shawn, while Carlos McCullers II continued to play young Gus. Cybill Shepherd joined the cast as Madeleine Spencer for three episodes. Rachael Leigh Cook also joined the show, as Abigail Lytar. Phylicia Rashad reprised her role as Winnie Guster, while the role of Bill Guster was turned over to Keith David. Ally Sheedy made her first appearance as the deranged serial killer Mr. Yang. Jimmi Simpson also made his debut on the show, as Mary Lightly.

Other prominent guests during the season included MacKenzie Astin, Justine Bateman, Sonja Bennett, Jere Burns, Faune A. Chambers, Gary Cole, Barry Corbin, Brooke D'Orsay, Jeff Fahey, Frank Gifford, Milena Govich, Elden Henson, Mickie James, Benjamin King, Emma Lahana, Ted Lange, Jane Lynch, Christopher McDonald, Bruce McGill, Ted McGinley, Ty Olsson, Kelly Overton, Richard Riehle, Shawn Roberts, Alan Ruck, Cassandra Sawtell, Jonathan Silverman, Todd Stashwick, Serinda Swan, Janet Varney, Steven Weber, Christopher Wiehl, and Mykelti Williamson.

== Episodes ==
List of Psych season 3 episodes
No. overall	No. in season	Title	Directed by	Written by	Original release date	U.S. viewers (millions)
32	1	"Ghosts"	Stephen Surjik	Steve Franks	July 18, 2008	4.89
Gus's boss (Todd Stashwick) forces him to choose between his pharmaceutical sales job and the Psych agency, so Shawn decides to save both jobs by investigating the home of the company's V.P. (Christopher McDonald), which appears to be haunted. In the meantime, Shawn must deal with the return of his mother Madeleine (Cybill Shepherd), a psychologist who is in town to evaluate some of Santa Barbara's finest, including Lassiter.
33	2	"Murder? … Anyone? … Anyone? … Bueller?"	Michael McMurray	Andy Berman	July 25, 2008	4.48
At first, no one believes Shawn when he claims that a murder took place at his and Gus's high school reunion, mainly because there's no body. As he puts the pieces together, Shawn must also deal with his old flame Abigail (Rachael Leigh Cook), whom he stood up back in high school, and shows a vulnerable side of himself never seen before. Henry continues to try and reconnect with his ex-wife Madeleine (Cybill Shepherd), and in the process shows up at the reunion.
34	3	"Daredevils!"	John Badham	Anupam Nigam	August 1, 2008	4.29
Shawn suspects sabotage when he sees a daredevil (Jeff Fahey) almost die during one of his stunts. As he and Gus get into his inner circle, however, they come to realize that there is sabotage involved, but it has nothing to do with someone holding a grudge. Also, Vick tasks O'Hara with a near-impossible task: finding Lassiter a girlfriend.
35	4	"The Greatest Adventure in the History of Basic Cable"	Jay Chandrasekhar	Josh Bycel	August 8, 2008	3.40
What starts out as a treasure hunt turns into a life-or-death situation when Shawn's uncle Jack (Steven Weber) arrives in town with a map apparently leading to an ancient Spanish treasure. Gus and Henry get involved, as well as the detectives, when all of Jack's ex-partners show up looking for the treasure, and they all have a bone to pick with him.
36	5	"Disco Didn't Die. It Was Murdered!"	Mel Damski	Saladin K. Patterson	August 15, 2008	3.66
In 1978, Henry achieved his career bust by arresting a man who was plotting to bomb the SBPD. When the culprit's conviction gets overturned, Henry must stay out of sight while Shawn attempts to put the would-be bomber behind bars again, only to realize that the case goes way beyond one man.
37	6	"There Might Be Blood"	John Badham	Kell Cahoon	August 22, 2008	3.96
A safety inspector's death on an offshore oil rig appears to be accidental, but Vick encounters difficulty with the Coast Guard – of which her sister (Jane Lynch) is a Commander – over jurisdiction. As Shawn finds himself as an unwitting pawn in their sibling rivalry, he finds out why the inspector was killed, and stumbles upon a missing person's case in the process.
38	7	"Talk Derby to Me"	Steve Miner	Tim Meltreger	September 5, 2008	4.23
Juliet goes undercover as a roller derby skater after Shawn deduces that a string of robberies have been committed by one of the teams. The case takes a turn when one of the robbers (Mickie James) botches a drop, and Shawn deduces that the robberies were a cover for something bigger. In the meantime, Gus is studying to get re-certified for his pharmaceutical sales job.
39	8	"Gus Walks into a Bank"	Eric Laneuville	Andy Berman	September 12, 2008	4.02
Gus ends up in a hostage situation after he walks into a bank. As Shawn attempts to negotiate with the gunman (Alan Ruck), he realizes that the situation was not meant to be a bank robbery, and not only does he butt heads with the chief negotiator (Gary Cole), he discovers something about Juliet that he would rather just forget.
40	9	"Christmas Joy"	John Landis	Saladin K. Patterson	November 28, 2008	3.71
Gus's sister Joy (Faune A. Chambers) comes to town for the holidays, and she seems very intent on continuing a past relationship with Shawn, who doesn't want Gus to know about it. When a little girl (Cassandra Sawtell) comes into Psych and asks Shawn and Gus to get a local Santa (Don McManus) out of jail, they begin to think they've been conned, until a dead body turns up. Meanwhile, the Gusters (including Phylicia Rashad and Keith David) discover that they have been keeping various secrets from each other. Psych's second annual Christmas special.
41	10	"Six Feet Under the Sea"	Steve Franks	Steve Franks	January 9, 2009	4.14
Shawn is none too pleased when Gus drags him to a funeral for local celebrity 'Shabby the Sea Lion' who was found dead after being released into the wild. Shawn sets out to prove it was murder and stumbles onto a bigger conspiracy.
42	11	"Lassie Did a Bad, Bad Thing"	Stephen Surjik	Kell Cahoon	January 16, 2009	3.65
Lassiter has never liked the presence of Shawn and Gus since they became consultants in solving cases, but he finds himself in need of their help when he is the main suspect in a murder committed in his own precinct. Shawn is already certain that Lassiter is not guilty, and deduces that the killing was an inside job.
43	12	"Earth, Wind and... Wait for It"	Tim Matheson	Anupam Nigam	January 23, 2009	3.83
An arson investigator (Milena Govich) gets no help when she suspects that a recent fire was the result of arson and not an accident, but all it takes is Shawn's intervention to reveal that an arsonist/murderer is on the loose, so he and Gus infiltrate the firehouse that put out the fire to find out how deep the case really goes.
44	13	"Any Given Friday Night at 10pm, 9pm Central"	Mel Damski	Josh Bycel	January 30, 2009	4.32
Shawn and Gus go undercover at a professional football training camp - whose coach (Mykelti Williamson) has a history with Shawn - when the foot of the team's missing kicker is discovered. At first it appears that he was killed by Russians to whom he owed a lot of money, but as Shawn keeps digging, he learns that the case is not at all what it seems.
45	14	"Truer Lies"	Martha Coolidge	Victoria Walker	February 6, 2009	4.46
A pathological liar Ryan (Jonathan Silverman) with a history of lying to the police is suspected of killing his super, and also claims to know about an assassination plot. Shawn is able to figure out that this liar is actually telling the truth, which leads him and Gus to an amnesiac, Tom Lieber (Jared Hillman), and the truth behind the case.
46	15	"Tuesday the 17th"	James Roday	Steve Franks & James Roday	February 13, 2009	4.27
Shawn and Gus are hired by a childhood friend named Jason Cunningham (MacKenzie Astin) to find a missing camp counselor who disappeared near their old sleep-away campgrounds, Camp Tikihama. Suddenly, Gus and Shawn find themselves entangled in a web of murder mystery when they are all stalked by a psychotic killer. Shawn then discovers they have been invited there by Jason as "test subjects" because he is reopening the camp as a horror camp, a place where people pay to have themselves chased by a "killer." After Jason reveals the truth behind the incident, everyone present finds themselves with the roads closed, and trapped. This time, at the mercy of a real killer. When people begin winding up dead, Shawn, Gus, and O'Hara try to find out who the killer is before it is too late. Meanwhile, Lassiter has dinner with his estranged wife Victoria (Justine Bateman), but it's a meeting he would rather forget.
47	16	"An Evening with Mr. Yang"	Mel Damski	Andy Berman & James Roday	February 20, 2009	4.83
Shawn decides to ask his high school crush Abigail (Rachael Leigh Cook) out on a real date, but he soon finds himself the target of the mysterious Mr. Yang (Ally Sheedy), a notorious serial killer who has been in exile since 1995. Shawn immediately suspects another consultant (Jimmi Simpson), but soon realizes that Yang will not be an easy catch. He must race across Santa Barbara trying to catch a criminal mastermind that always seems two steps ahead. The feud becomes personal when Madeleine Spencer (Cybill Shepherd) is kidnapped, and Shawn must push himself to his limits to solve this case.
