= Bill Callahan (TV producer) =

American television producer

Bill Callahan is a writer/producer for such shows as Spin City, 8 Simple Rules, Oliver Beene, Scrubs and Psych.

== Career ==
Callahan was an executive producer/writer on Scrubs, which entered its ninth season on December 1, 2009. He joined the show in its fourth season as co-executive producer, and was an executive producer for the sixth season, and the first six episodes of the seventh season. Scrubs is created by Bill Lawrence, who co-created Spin City, which Callahan also worked on, as co-producer/producer/supervising producer. He also was a writer on 8 Simple Rules and Psych, and a producer/writer on Oliver Beene. He is the first cousin of John C. McGinley with whom he worked on Scrubs.
