= Jimmi Simpson =

American actor (born 1975)

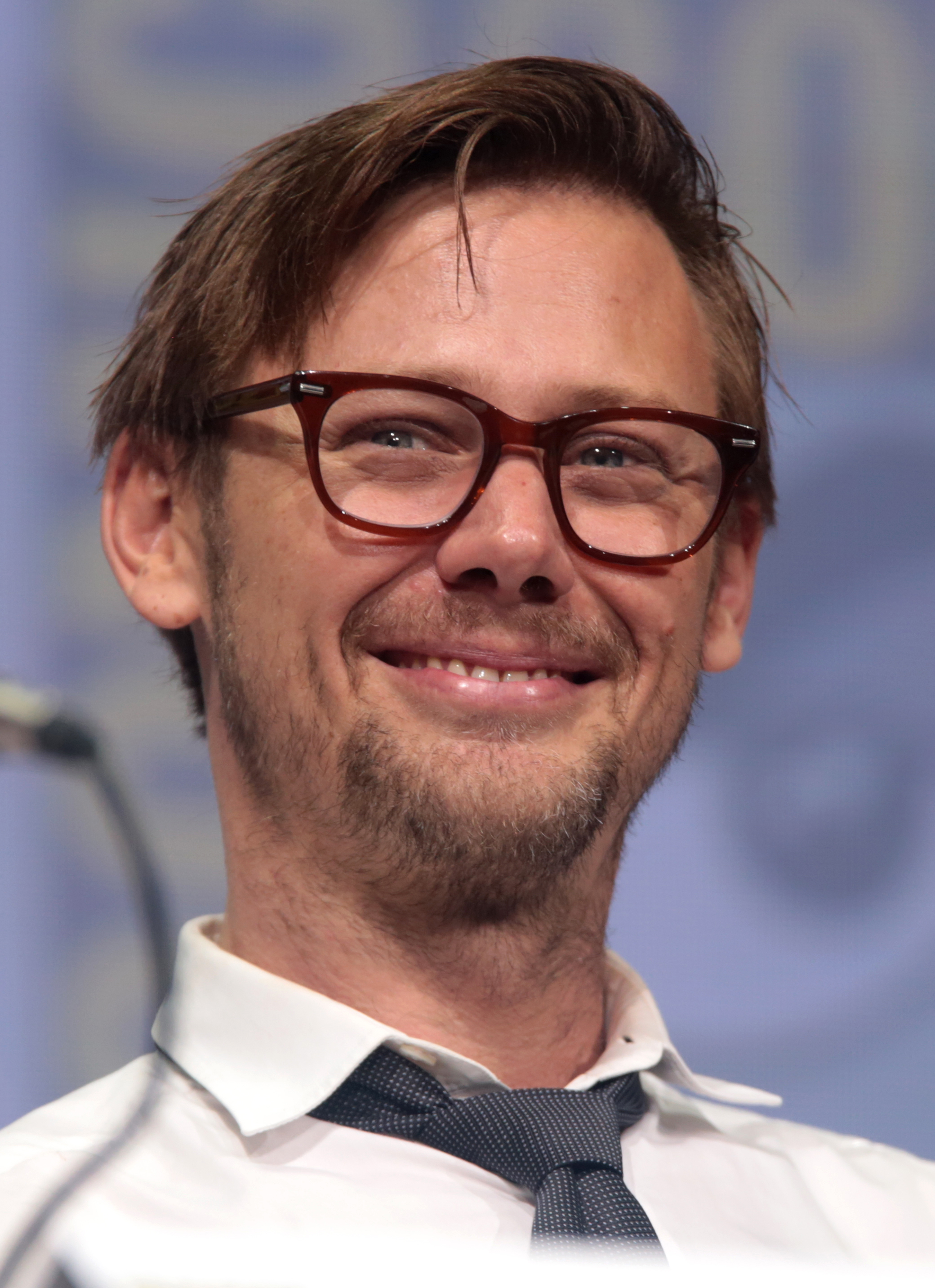
- Simpson in 2017
- Born: November 21, 1975 (age 50); Hackettstown, New Jersey, U.S.
- Occupation: Actor
- Years active: 1999–present
- Spouses: Melanie Lynskey (m. 2007; div. 2014); Sophia Del Pizzo (m. 2019; sep. 2021)

Jimmi Simpson (born November 21, 1975) is an American actor. Known for his work across film, television, and theater. He is the recipient of BAFTA, Primetime Emmy, and Screen Actors Guild Award nominations.

Simpson made his feature film debut in Loser (2000). Subsequent credits include Herbie: Fully Loaded (2005), Zodiac (2007), Date Night (2010), Abraham Lincoln: Vampire Hunter (2012), White House Down (2013), Under the Silver Lake (2018), and Unhinged (2020).

On television, Simpson played the recurring role of Liam McPoyle on It's Always Sunny in Philadelphia (2005–2026), and has since had roles in series such as Psych (2009–2013), Breakout Kings (2011–2013), The Newsroom (2014), House of Cards (2014–2015), Hap and Leonard (2016), Westworld (2016–2020), Black Mirror (2017, 2025), Unsolved (2018), Perpetual Grace, LTD (2019), The Man Who Fell to Earth (2022), Pachinko (2022–2024), and Dark Matter (2024–present). On stage, his portrayal of Philo Farnsworth in The Farnsworth Invention (Broadway, 2007–2008) earned him a Theatre World Award.

== Early life ==
Simpson was born in Hackettstown, New Jersey, on November 21, 1975. He has two older brothers. He attended Hackettstown High School, where he took his first acting class. After graduating from Bloomsburg University with a BA in theater, he acted for four seasons at the Williamstown Theatre Festival in Williamstown, Massachusetts.

== Career ==
=== 2000–2007: Film debut and early roles ===
Simpson made his film debut at age 25 when he played Noah in Loser (2000), a teen romantic comedy directed by Amy Heckerling. This was followed by a supporting role in the Stephen King miniseries Rose Red in 2002, and appearances on television shows such as 24, NYPD Blue, Cold Case, Carnivàle, and It's Always Sunny in Philadelphia, where he played the recurring character Liam McPoyle over several seasons, beginning in 2005. Film credits during this period included the sports comedy Herbie: Fully Loaded (2005), the revisionist Western Seraphim Falls (2006), and the critically acclaimed David Fincher thriller Zodiac (2007). In an appraisal of the latter's final sequence, where Simpson appears as Mike Mageau, a surviving victim of the real-life Zodiac Killer, Jim Emerson of RogerEbert.com wrote, "Mageau … is nearly a ghost, a deeply wounded soul who is 80 percent certain of his own certainty but, like everyone else, wishes he could be sure".

=== 2008–2015: Stage, television, and film work ===
In 2008, Simpson starred as Philo Farnsworth in a production of Aaron Sorkin's The Farnsworth Invention on Broadway. His portrayal of Farnsworth was described as "superb" by the Chicago Tribune, and earned him a Theatre World Award. That same year, he made the first of several appearances as Lyle, a fictitious intern, on The Late Show with David Letterman; a role he frequented until November 2009. During that time he made guest appearances on CSI: Crime Scene Investigation, My Name is Earl, House, M.D., and Psych, and played supporting parts in the 2009 comedy The Invention of Lying—the directorial debut of Ricky Gervais—and the big-budget romantic comedy Date Night (2010). Next, he appeared in one of the principal roles—Dr. Lloyd Lowery—on the A&E crime drama series Breakout Kings, which ran from 2011 to 2012. The show drew a mixed reception, but critics agreed that Simpson's performance was its best asset.

Simpson's next projects were the films Abraham Lincoln: Vampire Hunter (2012), The Truth About Emanuel (2013), Knights of Badassdom (2013), and the Roland Emmerich action thriller White House Down (2013), where he played a villainous computer hacker. He then joined the cast of the Netflix political thriller series House of Cards, playing Gavin Orsay between 2014 and 2015. For this, Simpson was nominated on two occasions—alongside his co-stars—for the Screen Actors Guild Award for Outstanding Performance by an Ensemble.

In 2015, Simpson headlined a Circle X Theatre production of Trevor, a play written by Nick Jones. His portrayal of the title character, a full-grown chimpanzee, was roundly praised, with KCRW commenting, "You can't imagine the humanity that [Simpson] brings to Trevor. Yes, it's a funny play and, yes, there's some 'monkey business' but Mr. Simpson's gift is restraint. Instead of playing for broad laughs, he plays Trevor's struggle for just that: an honest struggle".

=== 2016–present: Westworld and career progression ===
Simpson starred on the first season of SundanceTV's dark comedy-drama Hap and Leonard in 2016. Den of Geek felt he displayed a "raw, manic energy" in his portrayal of Soldier—a psychotic drug dealer—that was "by turns infectious and terrifying", adding, "Seriously, [Simpson] is such a great bad guy". That same year, he appeared in a principal role on the debut season of HBO's science fiction drama series Westworld. His portrayal of William, a businessman who visits the titular Wild West-themed amusement park and falls in love with one of its android inhabitants, was described as "spellbinding" by Maureen Ryan of Variety. Simpson was once again nominated alongside his co-stars for a Screen Actors Guild Award in 2017, while his work on the show's second season earned him an Emmy Award nomination for Outstanding Guest Actor in a Drama Series. Speaking of the pressure he felt being part of the hit show, Simpson said, "I think [a lot of us fear] that we won't be able to sleep at night if we deliver work that we're not happy with … Westworld [is] a lot of responsibility. It's a huge show. There's so much money and publicity behind it … and [the creators] need us to show up and be as amazing as possible. So the fear is a factor, because you look over and you see Anthony fucking Hopkins … It leaves me wondering: 'How the hell did I get here?'".

In 2017, Simpson appeared as Walton, a lieutenant aboard the titular spaceship ("USS Callister") in the opening episode of the fourth season of British anthology sci-fi series Black Mirror. In their review, Den of Geek called Simpson "one of [television's] best-kept secrets" and remarked that his performance "pops off the screen". His portrayal of Walton earned him a nomination for the BAFTA Award for Best Supporting Actor the following year.

Simpson starred as the real-life Russell Poole in Unsolved, a ten-part miniseries based on the 1990s murders of rappers Tupac Shakur and Biggie Smalls, which ran on the USA Network between February and May 2018. IndieWire praised the "elevated artistry" of Simpson's portrayal of the LAPD detective, while Vulture said in their review:

In an ensemble this solid, it can be challenging for one performance to emerge as a standout. But Simpson's does because he so carefully calibrates Poole's intensity, dialing it up by slight degrees in each episode until he's radiating with panicky determination ... Simpson physically and emotionally illustrates [the character's] internal struggle beautifully.

Simpson's next roles were in David Robert Mitchell's neo-noir black comedy Under the Silver Lake (2018), the action thriller Unhinged (2020), and the comedic crime drama Breaking News in Yuba County (2021). He also headlined the ten-part Epix series Perpetual Grace, LTD in 2019, earning strong reviews for his portrayal of James Schaeler, an ex-firefighter embroiled in a conspiracy to scam a corrupt pastor; Darren Franich of Entertainment Weekly described him as "an endearingly slippery protagonist, looking terrified, sad, amused, and exhausted all at once".

Between April and July 2022, Simpson appeared as CIA agent Spencer Clay in Showtime's adaptation of The Man Who Fell to Earth, which ran for a single season. In a mixed review of the series, Vulture commented that it felt "unsure" of itself, but said of Simpson, "[he tears] into the material [in] amusing and engaging ways". In March that same year, he began playing Tom Andrews on the Apple TV+ drama Pachinko. Chronicling an immigrant Korean family across four generations, the series was universally praised.

Simpson received positive notices for his portrayal of an alcoholic father in the 2023 coming-of-age film The Starling Girl, an independent drama about fundamentalist Christianity that Peter Debruge of Variety felt was "refreshing" and "rigorously realistic". From 2023 to 2024, he voiced Doctor Royce Hemlock in seasons 2 and 3 of the Disney+ animated series Star Wars: The Bad Batch.

Simpson wrote the upcoming horror comedy film Slay.

== Personal life ==
Simpson met New Zealand actress Melanie Lynskey in 2001 during the filming of Rose Red, in which they both appeared. They became engaged in 2005 and married on April 14, 2007, in a chapel on Lake Hayes, near Queenstown, New Zealand. Lynskey filed for divorce in September 2012, citing irreconcilable differences. It was finalized in May 2014.

Simpson married English actress Sophia Del Pizzo in April 2019. It was announced in July 2021 that the pair had split and that Simpson had filed for divorce.

== Filmography ==
=== Film ===
Year	Title	Role	Appearance
2000	Loser	Noah	
2001	Slo-Mo	Alex	Short film
2003	The Academy		Direct-to-video
2003	Final Draft	Chad	
2004	D.E.B.S.	Scud	
2005	Herbie: Fully Loaded	Crash	
2006	Stay Alive	Phineus	
2007	Seraphim Falls	Big Brother	
2007	Itty Bitty Titty Committee	Chris	
2007	Zodiac	Older Mike Mageau	
2008	A Quiet Little Marriage	Jackson	
2009	The Mother of Invention	Martin Wooderson	
2009	The Invention of Lying	Bob	
2009	Taking Chances	Charlie Cabonara	
2010	Miss This at Your Peril	Frank Corral	Short film
2010	Good Intentions	Kyle	
2010	Date Night	Armstrong Gold	
2011	The Death and Return of Superman	Mad Scientist	Short film
2011	The Big Bang	Niels Geck	
2012	Hello I Must Be Going	Phil	
2012	Abraham Lincoln: Vampire Hunter	Joshua Speed	
2012	Tracer Gun	Ben	Short film
2013	The Truth About Emanuel	Arthur	
2013	White House Down	Skip Tyler	
2013	Knights of Badassdom	Ronnie Kwok	
2014	The Last Time You Had Fun	Jake	
2015	Gravy	Stef	
2018	Under the Silver Lake	Allen	
2020	Unhinged	Andy	
2021	Breaking News in Yuba County	Petey Buttons	
2021	Night of the Animated Dead	Johnny	Voice role
2021	Silk Road	Chris Tarbell	
2022	Studio 666	Venue person	
2022	Green Lantern: Beware My Power	Green Arrow / Oliver Queen	Voice role
2022	A Little White Lie	Detective Karpas	
2023	The Starling Girl	Paul Starling	
2023	Fool's Paradise	Talk Show Host	
2024	Justice League: Crisis on Infinite Earths	Green Arrow / Oliver Queen	Voice role
2024	Audrey's Children	Dr. Dan D'Angio	
2025	Frankenbabes from Beyond the Grave	Dr. Channard Chatterly	Short film
2025	Home Delivery	Kevin Messina	
TBD	Rule of Three †	TBA	

Key
†	Denotes films that have not yet been released

=== Television ===
Year	Title	Role	Appearance
2002	Rose Red	Kevin Bollinger	3 episodes
2002	The Division	Sean Townsend	Episode: "Forgive Me, Father"
2002	24	Chris	3 episodes
2003	NYPD Blue	Mike	Episode: "Bottoms Up"
2003	Cold Case	Ryan Bayes	Episode: "Churchgoing People"
2005	Carnivàle	Lee	2 episodes
2005–2026	It's Always Sunny in Philadelphia	Liam McPoyle	9 episodes
2006	My Name Is Earl	David Hayes	2 episodes
2007	Girltrash!	Valentine	Episode #1.1
2008	Eleventh Hour	Will Sanders	Episode: "Resurrection"
2008	CSI: Crime Scene Investigation	Thomas Donover	2 episodes
2008–2009	Late Show with David Letterman	Lyle the intern	15 episodes
2009	House	Father Daniel Bresson	Episode: "Unfaithful"
2009	Virtuality	Virtual Man	Pilot
2009–2013	Psych	Mary Lightly	5 episodes
2010	Party Down	Jackal Onassis / Dennis	Episode: "Jackal Onassis Backstage Party"
2011	How I Met Your Mother	Pete Durkenson	Episode: "The Naked Truth"
2011–2012	Breakout Kings	Lloyd Lowery	23 episodes
2013	Unsupervised	Matthew / Dean Jacobs (voice)	Episode: "The Great Traveler's Road"
2013–2016	Person of Interest	Logan Pierce	2 episodes
2014	The Newsroom	Jack Spaniel	3 episodes
2014–2015	House of Cards	Gavin Orsay	17 episodes
2016	Hap and Leonard	Soldier	6 episodes
2016	This Is Us	Andy Fanning	Episode: "Last Christmas"
2016–2020	Westworld	William	Series regular (season 1); recurring (season 2); guest (season 3)
2017	Psych: The Movie	Mary Lightly	Television film
2017	Wormwood	CIA Agent	2 episodes
2017, 2025	Black Mirror	James Walton / Lt. Walton	2 episodes
2018	Unsolved	Detective Russell Poole	10 episodes
2018–2020	Dream Corp LLC	Patient 21	2 episodes
2019	Into the Dark	Peter Rake	Episode: "Treehouse"
2019	Perpetual Grace, LTD	James	10 episodes
2020	The Twilight Zone	Phil Hayes	Episode: "Meet in the Middle"
2020	Psych 2: Lassie Come Home	Mary Lightly	Television film
2021	Solar Opposites	Ethan (voice)	Episode: "The Apple Pencil Pro"
2021	Ultra City Smiths	Detective David Mills (voice)	Main role
2021–2024	Star Trek: Prodigy	Drednok (voice)	Main role
2022–2024	Pachinko	Tom Andrews	12 episodes
2022	The Man Who Fell to Earth	Spencer Clay	Main role
2022	Somebody Feed Phil	Himself	Episode: "Oaxaca"
2023–2024	Star Wars: The Bad Batch	Doctor Royce Hemlock (voice)	11 episodes
2024–present	Dark Matter	Ryan Holder	Main role
2025	Twisted Metal	Quatro (voice)	2 episodes
2025	Universal Basic Guys	Ray (voice)	Episode: "Down the Shore"
2025–present	Haunted Hotel	Abaddon (voice)	Main role
2026	The Walking Dead: Dead City	Mason Dillard	Main role (season 3); 7 episodes
2026	The Simpsons	Don Jeffries, Man (voices)	Episode: "The Kosmic Kruiser"

Key
†	Denotes television productions that have not yet been released

=== Video games ===
Year	Title	Role	Ref.
2008	Wanted: Weapons of Fate	Wesley "The Killer II" Gibson	
2022	Star Trek Prodigy: Supernova	Drednok	

== Awards and nominations ==
Year	Association	Category	Work	Result	Ref.
2008	Theatre World Awards	Theatre World Award	The Farnsworth Invention	Won	
2013	Ashland Independent Film Festival	Best Acting Ensemble (shared with the cast)	The Truth About Emanuel	Won	
2015	Screen Actors Guild Awards	Outstanding Performance by an Ensemble in a Drama Series (shared with the cast)	House of Cards	Nominated	
2016	Screen Actors Guild Awards	Outstanding Performance by an Ensemble in a Drama Series (shared with the cast)	House of Cards	Nominated	
2017	Screen Actors Guild Awards	Outstanding Performance by an Ensemble in a Drama Series (shared with the cast)	Westworld	Nominated	
2018	British Academy Television Awards	Best Supporting Actor	Black Mirror (Episode: "USS Callister")	Nominated	
2018	Primetime Emmy Awards	Outstanding Guest Actor in a Drama Series	Westworld	Nominated	
