= Psych season 7 =

Psych
- Season 7
- DVD cover art.
- Starring: James Roday; Dulé Hill; Timothy Omundson; Maggie Lawson; Kirsten Nelson; Corbin Bernsen
- No. of episodes: 14 (Note: Psych: The Musical is a two-hour episode, comprising episodes 15 and 16 of the season order.)

Release
- Original network: USA Network
- Original release: February 27 – May 29, 2013 (Note: Psych: The Musical aired as a special event on December 15, 2013, outside of the seventh season's primary run.)

Season chronology
- ← Previous; Season 6 Next → Season 8

The seventh season of Psych, containing 14 episodes, premiered on the USA Network in the United States on February 27, 2013. The primary run ended on May 29, 2013, but a television special, Psych: The Musical aired later in the year. James Roday, Dulé Hill, Timothy Omundson, Maggie Lawson, Corbin Bernsen, and Kirsten Nelson all reprised their roles as the main characters in the series.

== Production ==
Steve Franks continued as showrunner of the series. The song "I Know, You Know", performed by The Friendly Indians, continued to be used as the theme song for the show.

Psych was renewed for its seventh season on January 10, 2012. On April 6, 2012, Dulé Hill tweeted that filming for the season was to begin on April 23, 2012.

The previously announced musical episode, originally thought to be part of the sixth season, aired during the seventh as a two-hour event in December 2013. However, the episode was intended to occur in the middle of the season, and it suffers several continuity errors as a result. The season also contains episodes inspired by Clue and The Blair Witch Project; the Clue-based episode aired as the series' 100th.

== Cast ==
James Roday continued to portray the fake psychic detective Shawn Spencer. Dulé Hill appeared as Burton "Gus" Guster. Timothy Omundson and Maggie Lawson portrayed detectives Carlton "Lassie" Lassiter and Juliet "Jules" O'Hara, respectively. Corbin Bernsen continued as Henry Spencer, and Kirsten Nelson returns as SBPD Chief Karen Vick.

Kurt Fuller and Sage Brocklebank reprised their recurring roles as Woody the Coroner and Officer Buzz McNab, respectively. Ally Sheedy returned to the series in the musical episode as Mr. Yang Cybill Shepherd returned as Madeleine Spencer, Shawn's mother, while Kristy Swanson continued to portray Marlowe Viccellio, Lassiter's convict girlfriend (who is released and married to Lassiter during season seven). Max Gail, Arden Myrin, and Jerry Wasserman returned in the premiere, titled "Santabarbaratown 2", reprising their roles of Henry's shooter, stalker, and the shooter's accomplice, respectively, from the sixth season. The season had a Clue inspired 100th episode, with Curt Smith returning as himself. Parminder Nagra appeared in a recurring role as Rachael, a beautiful and charming woman for whom Gus falls; she is later revealed to be a single mother. Jeffrey Tambor appears in two episodes as Juliet's step-father, Lloyd French. Anthony Michael Hall appears as Harris Trout, a consultant hired by the mayor to increase efficiency at the SBPD. John Kapelos makes his first appearance as the Mayor of Santa Barbara. Other guest stars for the season included Rose Abdoo, Garcelle Beauvais, Rachel Blanchard, Barry Bostwick, Cocoa Brown, Cindy Busby, Jake Busey, Tate Ellington, Pete Gardner, Lauriane Gilliéron, Neil Grayston, Gregory Harrison, David Koechner, Christopher Lloyd, Lori Loughlin, Brooke Lyons, Jessica Makinson, Eddie Matos, Mike McGlone, Katy Mixon, Rebeka Montoya, Garrett Morris, Oliver Muirhead, Martin Mull, Josh Pais, Tony Plana, Kirsten Prout, Anthony Rapp, Kate Rogal, Ethan Sandler, Big Show, Joey Slotnick, Sebastian Spence, Mike Starr, Steve Valentine and Lesley Ann Warren.

== Episodes ==
List of Psych season 7 episodes
No. overall	No. in season	Title	Directed by	Written by	Original release date	U.S. viewers (millions)
96	1	"Santabarbaratown 2"	Mel Damski	Steve Franks & Bill Callahan	February 27, 2013	2.94
After dirty cop Jerry Carp (Max Gail) shoots Henry and leaves him for dead, Shawn comes completely unglued as he attempts to find Carp. He quickly discovers that Carp is involved in other criminal activity which goes deeper than Shawn had previously imagined. Though Gus and Juliet discourage him from investigating, Shawn receives some unlikely help. Meanwhile, a former stalker (Arden Myrin) takes it upon herself to nurse Henry back to health.
97	2	"Juliet Takes a Luvvah"	Andy Berman	Andy Berman	March 6, 2013	2.81
Shawn moves back home to help Henry recover from his shooting, and his mother (Cybill Shepherd) returns home as well. Shawn's disappointment at living with his parents again takes a backseat to his anger and jealousy at seeing Juliet on a date with another man, but then he learns she is undercover to solve two murders with a connection to a dating website. Matters become more complicated when Shawn learns that Gus met his new girlfriend (Parminder Nagra) through the same site, and suspects she's hiding something.
98	3	"Lassie Jerky"	James Roday	James Roday	March 13, 2013	3.04
In the forest near Santa Barbara, Shawn and Gus join two college students, Kate Favor (Kate Rogal) and Chavo Seacrest (Alex Enriquez) with a documentary about Bigfoot. After running away from what is apparently a hairy beast, Gus accidentally falls into a pit and discovers three dead bodies, turning their excursion into a triple homicide case which brings Lassiter and Juliet into the mix. After Lassiter is hurt and taken away, they all realize that whoever killed those three people is determined to protect themselves at all costs.
99	4	"No Country for Two Old Men"	Mel Damski	Kell Cahoon	March 20, 2013	2.45
At a housewarming party for Shawn and Juliet, Shawn meets Juliet's mother and accountant stepfather Lloyd (Jeffrey Tambor). After Shawn arranges for Henry and Lloyd to spend time together, the two suddenly head for Mexico when it's revealed that Lloyd not only has huge gambling debts, but has to make an important delivery to save his own life. Shawn, Gus and Juliet quickly head to Mexico to help them, and Juliet cannot be more disappointed that her latest father figure has let her down.
100	5	"100 Clues"	Matt Shakman	Todd Harthan	March 27, 2013	2.93
In the show’s 100th episode, after a rock star (Steve Valentine) serves a term in jail for manslaughter, Shawn and Juliet are invited to a party celebrating his release. When Juliet is tied up at the station with work, Shawn takes Gus instead. During the party, held at a large mansion, one of the guests is murdered. Lassiter and Juliet join the guests in trying to figure out what happened. When more dead bodies pile up, the guests start pointing fingers at each other. It is up to Shawn to unmask the real killer. The ending of this episode was chosen based on live online fan votes. As a result, the east coast and west coast airings ended with different killers. The episode parodies the movie Clue, featuring a mansion reminiscent of the one from the film, as well as three cast members of that movie as guest stars (Christopher Lloyd, Lesley Ann Warren, and Martin Mull). Garrett Morris also guest stars, as Clizby the Butler.
101	6	"Cirque Du Soul"	Jennifer Lynch	Saladin K. Patterson	April 3, 2013	2.41
Shawn, Gus and Rachael's son witness a trapeze artist fall to his death, which drives a wedge between Gus and Rachael. In the meantime, Lassiter's girlfriend Marlowe (Kristy Swanson) is released from prison, but her parole officer (Katy Mixon) has an axe to grind against Lassiter since he rejected her after a one-night stand. This becomes Shawn's problem as well when Juliet invites them to stay at their home, while Gus blaming Shawn for his relationship problems only adds to his frustration.
102	7	"Deez Nups"	James Roday	Bill Callahan & James Roday	April 10, 2013	2.25
For the first time, Lassiter decides to pass on a major case–which involves a local crime boss–in favor of his upcoming marriage. As such, Shawn, Gus, Henry and Woody decide to "kidnap" Lassiter for a bachelor party, except they wind up finding the crime boss' accountant, who took off with a lot of money and his boss' financial records. Everyone must find a way to solve the case in time for the wedding. When the day is over, Shawn unexpectedly finds his entire world turned on its head when Juliet realizes he is not psychic.
103	8	"Right Turn or Left for Dead"	David Crabtree	Carlos Jacott	April 17, 2013	2.77
Shawn isn't sure what to do next after Juliet finds out that he is not psychic, but he has a bigger problem on his hands when the taxi he's in narrowly avoids hitting an injured Swedish woman (Lauriane Gilliéron), giving him a head injury in the process. As he investigates from there, a string of murders is revealed, but Shawn plays it out from two scenarios, the second being what would've happened if Juliet never discovered the truth. In the end, it is Juliet who crushes Shawn further when she orders him to move out.
104	9	"Juliet Wears the Pantsuit"	Jennifer Lynch	Brittany Hilgers	April 24, 2013	2.46
A less than pleased Shawn finds out that Juliet has placed an ad for a new roommate, before Shawn has fully moved out. Juliet's first choice turns up dead, but that doesn't stop her from accepting a woman named Laura (Rachel Blanchard) next. Shawn quickly figures out that Laura is hiding something, but Juliet brushes him off, until they learn that she had previously lived under several different identities, and could potentially be a murderer.
105	10	"Santa Barbarian Candidate"	Richard Coleman	Tim Meltreger	May 1, 2013	2.35
The mayor of Santa Barbara has apparently died in a surfing accident, and though Shawn has figured out that it wasn't accidental, the police are content to let the matter die. Knowing that he has to take a very unconventional approach and since he suspects the man next in line to be the murderer, he decides to run for mayor in order to stall for time. Unfortunately, the case becomes the least of his problems when he learns that, if he is to have any chance to reconcile with Juliet, he will have to reveal that he's not a psychic to Chief Vick.
106	11	"Office Space"	Andrew Bernstein	Andy Berman & Todd Harthan	May 8, 2013	2.29
After having spent a night with Juliet, Shawn is woken up at a late hour by Gus, who has just found his boss stabbed to death and has accidentally contaminated the crime scene. While Shawn tries to help clean up the mess, he and Gus add to the problem by involving Henry and Woody and then inadvertently implicating Juliet with a coffee mug Shawn left behind, as well as a bloody nose. With time running out, Shawn and Gus must hurry to solve the case before there is enough evidence to tie them to the murder.
107	12	"Dead Air"	Saladin K. Patterson	Saladin K. Patterson & Kell Cahoon	May 15, 2013	2.31
When a DJ that had previously interviewed Shawn and Gus is murdered during his show, Shawn and Gus go undercover as DJs to investigate. This creates problems between Gus and Rachel when the station manager (Garcelle Beauvais) makes a play for Gus. Gus's problems are compounded when Rachel tells him she must return to Europe for six months to straighten out problems with her visa.
108	13	"Nip and Suck It!"	Mel Damski	Carlos Jacott & Tim Meltreger	May 22, 2013	2.48
While birdwatching, Henry discovers the dead body of a patient of brilliant cosmetic surgeon Dr. Joan Diamond (Lori Loughlin), an old flame of his. Shawn and Gus, who suspect Dr. Diamond, soon find themselves competing with Henry, who Dr. Diamond has hired. As they race for an answer, Gus becomes insecure about his appearance. After the real culprit is arrested, Shawn reveals that he and Juliet are officially back together, and Gus receives a troubling letter from Rachael, which he believes may lead to a break-up.
109	14	"No Trout About It"	Brad Turner	Bill Callahan & Carlos Jacott	May 29, 2013	2.18
Shawn, Gus, Lassiter and Juliet are questioned by Harris Trout (Anthony Michael Hall), a police consultant, over their seemingly poor police work. To prove their worth, Shawn recounts a case involving a lawyer being poisoned and the theft of diamonds worth $10 million. Even after the criminal is caught, Trout suspends Vick for six months and becomes interim police chief of the SBPD. He then fires McNab, demotes Lassiter as Head Detective and will no longer hire Shawn and Gus for any future cases.

== DVD release ==
Psych: The Complete Seventh Season, consisting of 14 episodes, was released on DVD on October 8, 2013. The three-disc set is presented in anamorphic widescreen format, English Dolby Digital 5.1 surround sound, and with English subtitles. The bonus features of the set include a director's cut of the episode "100 Clues", deleted scenes; a gag reel, five video podcasts featuring producers, writers, and directors, and "Psychouts." The entire running time for the set is 10 hours, 13 minutes. The episode "Psych: The Musical" was released separately on DVD on December 17, 2013, just two days after airing. The musical was also included on the season 8 DVD.

== Notes ==
† denotes a two-hour episode (with advertisements).
