= Andy Dick =

American comedian and actor (born 1965)

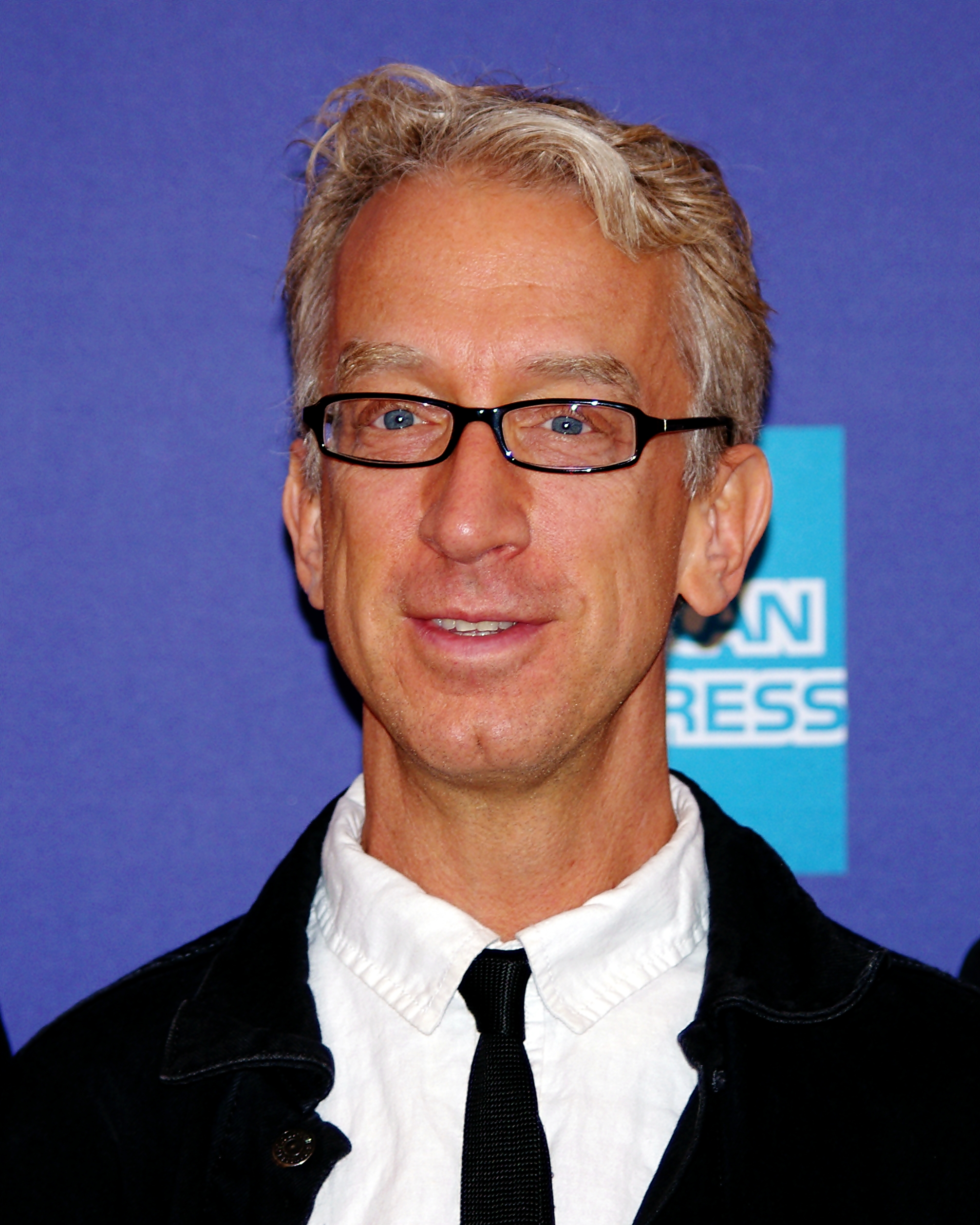
- Dick at the 2012 Tribeca Film Festival premiere of Freaky Deaky
- Born: Andrew Thomlinson; December 21, 1965 (age 60); Charleston, South Carolina, US
- Spouse: Ivone Kowalczyk (m. 1986; div. 1990)
- Children: 3

Comedy career
- Years active: 1986–present
- Medium: Stand-up; television; film; radio
- Subjects: Improv sketch comedy Recreational drug use

Andrew Roane Dick (born Andrew Thomlinson, December 21, 1965) is an American actor and comedian. Dick was born in Charleston, South Carolina, and joined The Second City and studied improvisational theater. Dick has had a long career as a stand-up comedian; he has appeared throughout the United States, has released several comedy albums, and has acted in television and film. Dick's first regular television role was on The Ben Stiller Show on Fox. In the mid-1990s, he regularly appeared on NBC's NewsRadio and as a supporting character on Less than Perfect. He also had two short-lived television series on MTV; these were the sketch comedy series The Andy Dick Show (2001) and the reality series The Assistant (2004). He also is noted for his behavior on a number of Comedy Central Roasts, stand-up comedy performances, and late night talk show appearances.

Dick is also known for his eccentric behavior, problems with drug addiction, sexual misconduct, and arrests. Dick has said he has tried to deal with his drug and alcohol-use disorders for years and by 2025, he said he had undergone drug rehabilitation programs 37 times. In 2022, after a conviction for a 2018 offense, Dick was ordered to register as a sex offender.

== Early life and education ==
Andy Dick was born on December 21, 1965, in Charleston, South Carolina, as Andrew Thomlinson. He was adopted at birth by Allen and Sue Dick, and was named Andrew Roane Dick. He was brought up as a Presbyterian. His father was in the Navy.

As a child, Dick lived with his family in Connecticut, Pennsylvania, New York, and Yugoslavia before moving to Chicago in 1979. He attended George Walton Comprehensive High School in Cobb County, Georgia. Dick appeared in numerous theater productions during his high-school years, and was elected homecoming king of his senior year in 1983. He graduated from Joliet West High School in Joliet, Illinois, in 1984.

While in high school, Dick used his surname as a joke; one day, he dressed in a homemade superhero costume and presented himself at school as "Super Dick". Dick has been a friend of actor Anthony Rapp since childhood.

After high school, Dick joined Chicago-based theater group The Second City and attended Illinois Wesleyan University for a semester before attending Columbia College Chicago, where he spent most of his university career, and took improvisational theater (improv) comedy classes at iO Theater.

== Career ==
=== Television ===
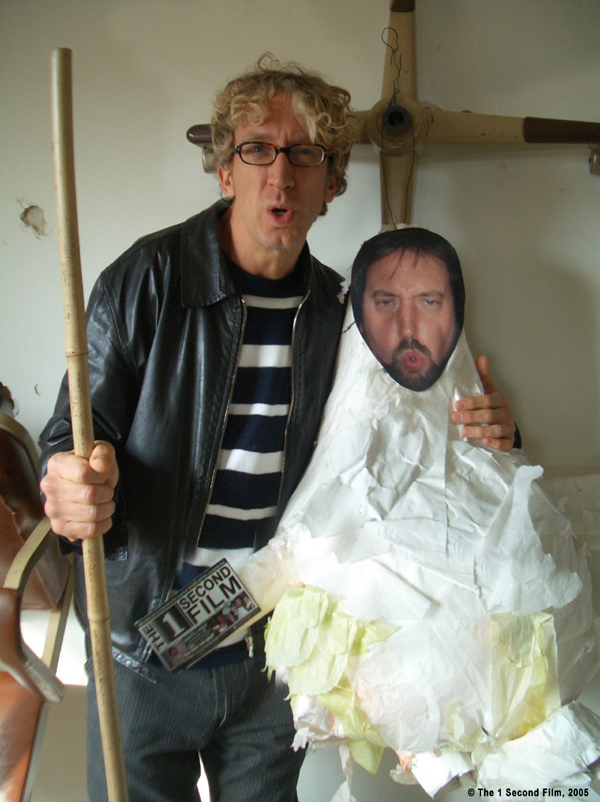
Dick holding a piñata with a cutout of Tom Green for The 1 Second Film in December 2004

Andy Dick started his television comedy career as a cast member on the sketch comedy program The Ben Stiller Show, which aired on the Fox Network from September 1992 to August 1995. In 1993, on the third night of David Letterman's new CBS show, Dick appeared as "Donnie the CBS Page Who Likes to Suck Up", during which he gave Letterman a watch. Letterman then handed Dick a pencil, prompting Dick to cry and walk backstage.

In 1994, Dick played a stylist named Pepé in The Nanny episode "Maggie the Model". He also starred as Zachary Smart, the son of Maxwell Smart and Agent 99, in Get Smart (1995), a role he tried to escape to work on NewsRadio. In 2001, Dick starred with Kieran Culkin on the short-lived NBC television series Go Fish.

Dick has regularly appeared on several sitcoms, including NewsRadio on NBC (1995–1999), portraying reporter Matthew Brock, and on the ABC sitcom Less than Perfect as Owen Kronsky.

In 2001, Dick, along with colleagues and producers, developed The Andy Dick Show for MTV that ended in 2003 after three seasons. In 2004, Dick starred in the MTV satirical reality television show The Assistant, which parodies themes and scenes from The Apprentice, The Bachelor, Queer Eye for the Straight Guy, and Survivor.

Dick had also had a guest appearance on Star Trek: Voyager as the Emergency Medical Hologram Mark II in "Message in a Bottle". He competed in the eighth season of Celebrity Poker Showdown, in which finished in last place behind Robin Tunney, Christopher Meloni, Macy Gray, and Joy Behar.

In 2008, Dick appeared on episode No. 3 of The Real World: Hollywood to tell cast members they would be taking improv classes.

Dick was a contestant on Season 16 of Dancing with the Stars in 2013. He was partnered with former troupe member Sharna Burgess and was placed seventh in the competition. Dick appeared on ABC's Celebrity Wife Swap on July 14, 2013.

=== Film ===
One of Andy Dick's earliest film roles was a fictional version of himself in the film adaptation of video game Double Dragon. In 1993, Dick played himself in the mockumentary The Making of... And God Spoke. He also starred alongside comedian Pauly Shore in the 1994 war comedy film In the Army Now. Also in 1994, Dick made a cameo in Ben Stiller's directorial debut, Reality Bites.

In 1997, Dick had a supporting role alongside Luke Wilson and Jack Black in Bongwater as Wilson's gay friend who gives him a place to stay after his house is destroyed by fire. In 1999, Dick played one of Dr. Claw's henchmen in Inspector Gadget.

In 2000, Dick made a cameo appearance in Dude, Where's My Car?. The same year, he appeared as a motel clerk in the teenage comedy Road Trip. In 2001, Dick made a cameo as Olga the Masseuse in Ben Stiller's comedy Zoolander.

In 2002, Dick appeared as a taxi cab driver in the band Ash's music video "Envy". In 2003, he appeared in Will Ferrell's Old School as Barry the oral sex instructor and as a villainous Santa in The Hebrew Hammer. In 2005, Dick was featured in the documentary The Aristocrats. In 2006, he appeared in Employee of the Month as Lon, a nearsighted optician. He also provided the voice of Mambo in Happily N'Ever After (2007) and the voice of Boingo in Hoodwinked! (2005).

Dick's feature-film-directing debut was the 2006 film Danny Roane: First Time Director. In late December 2008, Dick announced on his official website he had finished writing a script for a film titled Daphne Aguilera: Get into It, starring his alter-ego Daphne Aguilera.

=== Voiceover work ===
In 1998, Andy Dick voiced the villain Nuka in the Disney direct-to-video animated film The Lion King II: Simba's Pride and provided the voice of Boingo for the Hoodwinked! movies in 2005. In November 2016, Dick reprised his role as Nuka for the television series The Lion Guard.

In 2000, Dick voiced Dilbert's assistant in the animated television show Dilbert. He also voiced the recurring character "Monkey Man" on the Nickelodeon television series Hey Arnold!.

In 2002, Dick provided the voice of Mr Sheepman and other characters in the short-lived animated series Clone High.

On August 19, 2009, Dick became a downloadable character in the PlayStation Network's video game Pain. In 2010, Dick voiced Jesus Christ in an episode of Mary Shelley's Frankenhole on Cartoon Network's segment Adult Swim.

=== Web series ===
While under house arrest in 2009, Dick created and starred in the five-episode web series House Arrest with Andy Dick, in whick Dick interviews celebrity guests including Greg Grunberg, Drew Pinsky, Mo Collins, Joey Greco, and Jennifer Coolidge. In 2012, Dick hosted Andy Dick Live!. Dick and Pauly Shore discussed the possibility of a sequel to In the Army Now during his appearance on the show. On September 19, 2013, Dick appeared with Melinda Hill in the first episode of the web series All Growz Up to talk about his early career and give advice to aspiring performers.

== Personal life ==
=== Family and relationships ===
From 1986 to 1990, Andy Dick was married to Ivone Kowalczyk, with whom he has a son who was born in 1988. He also has a son and a daughter with Lena Sved. In a 2006 interview with The Washington Post, Dick said he is bisexual.

=== David Strickland ===
In 1999, Dick was questioned about the suicide of actor David Strickland and identified his body. On March 20 that year, Dick and Strickland flew from Los Angeles to Las Vegas, and spent three days partying in strip clubs. Strickland hanged himself with a bed sheet over the ceiling beam and died during the morning of March 22, 1999. He was 29 years old.

=== Jon Lovitz ===
Andy Dick has a longstanding feud with former NewsRadio costar Jon Lovitz concerning the death of their mutual friend Phil Hartman. According to Lovitz, Dick had given Hartman's wife Brynn cocaine at a Christmas party at Hartman's house in 1997; Brynn, a recovering addict, began using drugs again, culminating in her killing of Hartman and her suicide on May 28, 1998. When Lovitz joined the cast of NewsRadio as Hartman's replacement, he and Dick argued; Lovitz shouted: "I wouldn't be here if you hadn't given Brynn coke in the first place". Lovitz later apologized to Dick for the remark.

Lovitz alleged that in early 2007, Dick approached him at a restaurant and said: "I put the Phil Hartman hex on you – you're the next to die". On July 10, 2007, Dick fought with Lovitz at Laugh Factory in Los Angeles; Lovitz demanded an apology from Dick, who refused and accused Lovitz of blaming him for Hartman's death. Lovitz then grabbed Dick by his shirt and slammed him backward into the bar, after which the doorman separated them.

=== Health and substance abuse ===
Dick has struggled with drug and alcohol dependence, and as of 2025 has undergone drug rehabilitation programs 37 times.

In April 2022, Dick alleged he was mugged in Las Vegas, presenting with severe facial injuries. In December 2025, Dick was found slumped over in the streets of Los Angeles, in an apparent overdose, with someone on the scene calling out for the drug Narcan. He survived the incident. Days later, he agreed to go to a rehab facility after initially refusing to do so.

=== Legal issues ===
On May 15, 1999, Dick drove his car into a utility pole in Hollywood, California. He was charged with possession of cocaine, cannabis, and drug paraphernalia, driving under the influence of alcohol/drugs, and hit-and-run driving. He later pleaded guilty to felony cocaine possession, misdemeanor cannabis possession, and possession of a "smoking device". The charges were dismissed after Dick completed an 18-month drug diversion program.

On December 4, 2004, Dick was arrested for indecent exposure after he exposed his buttocks at a McDonald's outlet.

On July 16, 2008, Dick was arrested in Murrieta, California, on suspicion of drug possession and sexual battery. He exposed the breasts of a 17-year-old girl when he allegedly grabbed and pulled down her tank top and brassiere. During a search of his person, police reported finding a small quantity of cannabis and one alprazolam (Xanax) tablet, for which Dick did not have a prescription. Dick was released from jail after posting $5,000 bail and later pleaded guilty to misdemeanor battery and marijuana possession. He was sentenced to three years probation and around $700 in fines, and was ordered to wear an alcohol-monitoring bracelet for one year.

On January 23, 2010, Dick was arrested at about 4:00 a.m. at a bar in Huntington, West Virginia, on suspicion of sexual abuse after reportedly groping a bartender and a patron. He was released from jail after pleading not guilty and posting $60,000 bail. On June 29, 2011, a Cabell County Grand Jury formally indicted Dick for two counts of first-degree sexual abuse. Dick pleaded not guilty during a formal arraignment in Cabell County Circuit Court, Huntington, on July 29, 2011. Judge Paul Ferrell set a trial date of January 17, 2012. After several delays, on May 21, 2012, Dick was given a six-month pre-trial diversion. An assistant prosecutor said the agreement stated the criminal charges would be dismissed if Dick would stay out of legal trouble for six months. Dick completed the pre-trial diversion program and the charges were dismissed. In January 2012, the two alleged victims filed a civil suit against Dick for unspecified damages.

In June 2018, Dick was charged with misdemeanor sexual battery and battery for allegedly groping a woman in April that year. In October 2019, Dick pleaded not guilty to charges he grabbed an Uber driver by the genitals. He was convicted and sentenced to 90 days in jail in November 2022. After his release, he was required to register as a sex offender and attend 52 sessions of Alcoholics Anonymous, pay restitution to the victim, receive mental-health counseling, and attend sessions of Sexual Compulsives Anonymous.

On June 29, 2021, Dick was arrested for felony assault with a deadly weapon; he was released from jail on June 30, 2021, after posting the $50,000 bond.

On May 10, 2022, Dick was arrested for felony sexual battery of a man in Orange County, California. The case was later dropped when the accuser refused to cooperate with local police. In October of 2022, Dick was arrested for felony burglary, allegedly of power tools.

Dick was again arrested in January 2023 for public intoxication and failure to register as a sex offender in Lake Elsinore, California.

== Controversies and incidents ==
In 2005, Dick dropped his pants and exposed his genitals to the audience at Yuk Yuk's comedy club in Edmonton, Alberta, Canada. He was ushered off the stage and the show's second night was canceled.

Dick groped Pamela Anderson during her 2005 Comedy Central roast, saying he was her plastic surgeon and used the premise to repeatedly grab her breasts. During the roast, Dick also attempted to grope Courtney Love, who proceeded to slap him across the face. Dick also mimed performing oral sex on Anderson's then-husband Tommy Lee.

At William Shatner's 2006 Comedy Central roast, Dick, performing as the lovechild of James T. Kirk and Spock, licked Farrah Fawcett, Carrie Fisher, and Patton Oswalt before allegedly biting New York Post reporter Mandy Stadtmiller.

In December 2006, Dick upset an audience at The Improv in Los Angeles by shouting "You're all a bunch of niggers!" following an improvised set with comedian Ian Bagg. This was a direct reference to Michael Richards' use of the same epithet to insult hecklers two weeks earlier. He later issued an apology via his publicist:

I chose to make a joke about a subject that is not funny, in an attempt to make light of a serious subject. I have offended a lot of people, and I am sorry for my insensitivity. I wish to apologize to Ian, to the club and its patrons and to anyone who was hurt or offended by my remark.

In February 2007, during an appearance on Jimmy Kimmel Live!, Dick was forcibly removed from the stage after repeatedly touching guest Ivanka Trump. Kimmel called in security guards Uncle Frank and Veatrice Rice, who assisted as Kimmel dragged off Dick by his legs. Kimmel later said: "Andy did a segment, he was a little out of it. [When Ivanka] came out, he wanted a big, wet kiss. It was time for Andy to go, so I escorted him out by his feet ... He always makes me a little uncomfortable, you have no idea what he's going to do next." Kimmel also said he had spoken to Dick afterwards and that Dick was not upset about the incident.

In October 2010, Dick was seen exposing himself and making a commotion at Café Audrey in Hollywood.

In January 2011, Dick was ejected from the AVN Awards, a pornographic movie awards ceremony, after repeatedly groping and stalking adult film actor Tera Patrick and drag queen Chi Chi LaRue.

In April 2011, Dick was at a party connected with Newport Beach Film Festival. He appeared intoxicated, exposed himself, urinated on a backdrop and afterwards destroyed it by pulling it down. The organizers said this caused thousands of dollars of damage and considered suing Dick over the incident.

In August 2011, Dick was a guest on Greg Fitzsimmons' radio show and made antisemitic statements about Howard Stern, calling Stern a "money-grubbing Jew" and a "hook-nosed Jew".

In October 2017, Dick was fired from a role in the independent film Raising Buchanan due to allegations of inappropriate behavior that, according to The Hollywood Reporter, "included groping people's genitals, unwanted kissing/licking and sexual propositions of at least four members of the production". Dick denied most of the allegations and said: "I might have kissed somebody on the cheek to say goodbye and then licked them. That's my thing – I licked Carrie Fisher at a roast. It's me being funny." In the same month, he was also fired and escorted off the set of the film Vampire Dad due to "multiple, flagrant acts of improper conduct and inappropriate contact with several crew members". He later said: "I overtook my medication and took too many Xanax and I was a bit loopy ... I won't do it anymore. I won't lick anyone's face anymore. We have an agreement."

In 2019, a man knocked out Dick with a punch to the head, causing him to be sent to a hospital to be monitored for a brain bleed. The man accused Dick of groping him and punched Dick in retaliation.

== Filmography ==
=== Film ===
| Year | Title | Role | Notes |
|---|---|---|---|
| 1989 | Elvis Stories | Allen | Short film |
| 1993 | The Making of '...And God Spoke' | Abel | |
| 1994 | Reality Bites | Rock | |
| 1994 | In the Army Now | Jack Kaufman | |
| 1994 | Double Dragon | Smogcaster | |
| 1995 | Hotel Oasis | Nick | Short film |
| 1996 | The Cable Guy | Medieval Times Host | |
| 1997 | Who's the Caboose? | Jason Reemer | |
| 1997 | Best Men | Teddy | |
| 1998 | Bongwater | Teddy | |
| 1998 | The Lion King II: Simba's Pride | Nuka | Voice, direct-to-video |
| 1998 | Permanent Midnight | Damian | Uncredited |
| 1999 | Inspector Gadget | Kramer | |
| 1999 | Advice from a Caterpillar | Spaz | |
| 1999 | Laputa: Castle in the Sky | Henri | Voice, English dub |
| 2000 | The Independent | Maitre d' | |
| 2000 | Loser | Another City Worker | |
| 2000 | Road Trip | Motel Clerk | |
| 2000 | Picking Up the Pieces | Father Buñuel | |
| 2000 | Dude, Where's My Car? | Mark | Uncredited |
| 2001 | Zoolander | Olga, The Masseuse | |
| 2001 | Scotland, PA | Jesse (Hippie #3) | |
| 2001 | Dr. Dolittle 2 | Lennie the Weasel | Voice |
| 2003 | Old School | Barry | Uncredited |
| 2003 | The Hebrew Hammer | Damian Claus | |
| 2003 | Scorched | Archie | |
| 2004 | Larceny | Chris | |
| 2005 | Hoodwinked! | Boingo | Voice |
| 2006 | The Bondage | Stewart | |
| 2006 | The Reef | Dylan, Curious Shark | Voice |
| 2006 | Happily N'Ever After | Mambo | Voice |
| 2006 | Employee of the Month | Lon | |
| 2006 | Danny Roane: First Time Director | Danny Roane | Also writer and director |
| 2006 | High Hopes | Patrick | |
| 2006 | Queer Duck: The Movie | Elizabeth Taylor, Rex | Voice, direct-to-video |
| 2006 | Love Hollywood Style | Bobby Ireland | |
| 2007 | Blonde Ambition | Freddy | |
| 2007 | The Comebacks | Toilet Bowl Referee | |
| 2007 | Chasing Robert | The Wire | |
| 2009 | Rock Slyde | Bart | |
| 2009 | Funny People | Himself | |
| 2010 | Fudgy Wudgy Fudge Face | Greasy Guy | |
| 2011 | Hoodwinked Too! Hood vs. Evil | Boingo the Bunny | Voice |
| 2011 | Division III: Football's Finest | Rick Vice | Also writer and producer |
| 2012 | Freaky Deaky | Mark Ricks | |
| 2012 | The Reef 2: High Tide | Dylan | Voice, direct-to-video |
| 2014 | Deadly Punkettes | Victor | |
| 2014 | Live Nude Girls | Eddie | |
| 2015 | L.A. Slasher | The Slasher | Voice |
| 2016 | Zoolander 2 | Don Atari's Posse Member | |
| 2016 | A Winter Rose | Billy Joe | |
| 2021 | The Wet Ones | The Bunny King | Cameo |

=== Television ===
| Year | Title | Role | Notes |
|---|---|---|---|
| 1989 | Anything but Love | Trell | Episode: "Woman on the Verge of a Nervous Breakdown" |
| 1990 | Sydney | The Waiter | Episode: "Sydney's Mom" |
| 1991 | Earth Angel | Brownnoser | Television film |
| 1992–1995 | The Ben Stiller Show | Various characters | 13 episodes |
| 1993 | Flying Blind | Film Student | Episode: "The Bride of Marsh Man 2: The Spawning" |
| 1993 | The Building | Joe | 2 episodes |
| 1994 | The Nanny | Pepé, Bernie | Episode: "Maggie the Model" |
| 1995 | Get Smart | Zach Smart | 7 episodes |
| 1995–1999 | NewsRadio | Matthew Brock | 97 episodes |
| 1997 | Johnny Bravo | Melon Head, Surfer Dude | Voice, episode: "Beach Blanket Bravo" |
| 1997 | Space Ghost Coast to Coast | Himself | Episode: "Boatshow" |
| 1998 | Star Trek: Voyager | EMH-2 Dr. Bradley | Episode: "Message in a Bottle" |
| 1999 | Just Shoot Me! | Kyle | Episode: "Finch Gets Dick" |
| 2000 | Dilbert | The Assistant | Voice, episode: "The Assistant" |
| 2000 | King of the Hill | Griffin | Voice, episode: "Movin' on Up" |
| 2000 | Caitlin's Way | William | 2 episodes |
| 2000 | Hey Arnold! | Monkeyman | Voice, episode: "Monkeyman!" |
| 2000 | Batman Beyond | Slim | Voice, episode: "The Eggbaby" |
| 2000 | Sammy | Mark Jacobs | Voice |
| 2000 | Special Delivery | Lloyd Steadman | Television film |
| 2001 | Go Fish | Ernie Hopkins | 5 episodes |
| 2001–2002 | The Andy Dick Show | Various characters | 21 episodes; also writer and executive producer |
| 2002, 2008 | Family Guy | Himself | Episodes: "Road to Europe" and "Tales of a Third Grade Nothing" |
| 2002–2003 | Clone High | Mr. Sheepman | Voice, 6 episodes |
| 2002–2006 | Less Than Perfect | Owen Kronsky | 81 episodes |
| 2004 | Stripperella | Larry Talbot / Werebeaver | Voice, episode: "The Curse of the WereBeaver" |
| 2004 | The Assistant | Presenter | Also executive producer |
| 2005 | The Comedy Central Roast of Pamela Anderson | Himself | Television special |
| 2006 | Arrested Development | Himself | Episode: "S.O.B.s" |
| 2006 | The Comedy Central Roast of William Shatner | Himself | Television special |
| 2007 | The Simpsons | Himself | Episode: "Yokel Chords" |
| 2007 | Jimmy Kimmel Live! | Himself | Season 5, Episode 20 |
| 2007 | ER | Tommy Brewer | Episode: "Crisis of Conscience" |
| 2008 | Rick & Steve: The Happiest Gay Couple in All the World | Protestor | Voice, episode: "Death of a Lesbian Bed" |
| 2009 | Head Case | Himself | Episode: "Tying the Not" |
| 2010 | CSI: Crime Scene Investigation | Armory Dealer | Episode: "Blood Moon" |
| 2010, 2011 | Community | Tiny Man, Helicopter Pilot | 2 episodes |
| 2010, 2012 | Mary Shelley's Frankenhole | Jesus Christ | Voice, 2 episodes |
| 2012 | Randy Cunningham: 9th Grade Ninja | Jerry Driscoll | Voice, episode: "Dawn of the Driscoll" |
| 2013 | Legit | Andy | Episode: "Health" |
| 2013 | Bad Samaritans | Floyd | Episode: "Middle School Detention" |
| 2013, 2016 | 2 Broke Girls | J. Petto | 3 episodes |
| 2014 | Sharknado 2: The Second One | Officer Doyle | Television film |
| 2015 | Maron | Himself | Episode: "Marc's Niece" |
| 2015 | Comedy Bang! Bang! | Andy Battlecorridor | Episode: "David Krumholtz Wears a Blue Zip-Up Jacket and Grey Sneakers" |
| 2016 | Workaholics | Mr. Buckley | Episode: "Meth Head Actor" |
| 2016 | Great Minds with Dan Harmon | John Wilkes Booth | Episode: "John Wilkes Booth" |
| 2016 | The Lion Guard | Nuka | Voice, episode: "Lions of the Outlands" |
| 2016–2017 | Love | Himself | 2 episodes |
| 2017–2018 | Animals. | Andy | Voice, episode: "Rats" |
| 2017 | Sense8 | Kit Wrangler | Episode: "If All the World's a Stage, Identity Is Nothing But a Costume" |
| 2019 | Valley Junk TV | Jared Levine | Episode: "The Crazy Agent" |
| 2021 | The Game Shoppe | Walter Molly | Animation Series |
| 2022 | That Moon Show | Himself | Animation Series |
| 2024 | LaShawn, The Aborted Fetus | TBA | Animation Series |

=== Video games ===
| Year | Title | Role | Notes |
|---|---|---|---|
| 2004 | Grand Theft Auto: San Andreas | Maurice, Talk Radio | Uncredited |
| 2005 | Marc Ecko's Getting Up: Contents Under Pressure | Aunt Beth | |
| 2007 | Pain | Himself | |

=== Music video appearances ===
| Year | Title | Artist(s) |
|---|---|---|
| 2006 | A Public Affair | Jessica Simpson |
| 2015 | Just Like You | Falling in Reverse |

== Discography ==
- Andy Dick & the Bitches of the Century (2002)
- Do Your Shows Always Suck? (2007)
- The Darkest Day of the Year (2009)
- Happy B-Day JC (w/ Willie Wisely) (2006)
- Addiction: Andy Dick Counsels the Dark Bob (w/ the Dark Bob) (2012)

=== Collaborations ===
- The Dark Bob: Stoked! (2006) – song: Father

=== Compilations ===
- The Aristocrats (Original Soundtrack) (2005)
- Hoodwinked! (Original Motion Picture Soundtrack) (2005)
- Live Nude Comedy Vol. 2 (2010)
- The Adam Carolla Show 2009, Vol. 1 (2014)
- The Adam Carolla Show 2009, Vol. 2 (2014)
- The Adam Carolla Show 2009, Vol. 3 (2014)
- The Adam Carolla Show 2010, Vol.1 (2014)
- The Un & Only (2015)
- The Good, The Bad, And the Drugly (2015)
