= Look Around (Anthony Rapp album) =

Studio album by Anthony Rapp
- Released: October 1, 2000
- Recorded: ?
- Genre: Alternative rock, pop rock
- Length: 46:24
- Label: Pai Gow Productions
- Producer: Joe Pisapia, John Keaney & Michael Corbett

Look Around is the first full-length album by American actor/singer Anthony Rapp, known as a singer for his performance as Mark Cohen in the musical Rent and the film adaptation of the musical. It was released on October 1, 2000.

== Track listing ==
1. "Living Alive" – 3:48 (Pisapia & Rapp)
2. "Look Around" – 3:52 (Pisapia & Rapp)
3. "Then Again" – 2:42 (Rapp)
4. "Human Tornado" – 2:35 (Keaney & Rapp)
5. "Always" – 4:06 (Keaney & Rapp)
6. "Just Some Guy" – 4:03 (Pisapia & Rapp)
7. "Goodbye" – 2:35 (Pisapia & Rapp)
8. "Room To Breathe" – 4:15 (Blum & Safran)
9. "Lesson #1" – 4:06 (Marshall Crenshaw)
10. "Visits To You" – 4:23 (Pisapia & Rapp)
11. "Out Out Damn Spot" – 4:14 (Pisapia)
12. "Now I Know" – 5:45 (Rapp)

== Credits ==
=== Tracks 1–6, 8, 12 ===
- Vocals – Anthony Rapp
- Guitar – Joe McMahan
- Bass – David Jacques
- Drums – Jimmy Lester

==== Additional musicians ====
- John Keaney – Guitar on 1, 3, 4, & 5, and piano 3, 5 & 8
- Michael Corbett – Keyboards on 5 & 12, Organ on 4
- Keith Lowen – backing vocals on 4 & 7
- Eric Fritsch – Guitar on 1, 3 & 12
- Joe Pisapia – Guitar on 2 & 6, back vocals on 4, 6, & 7
- Adam Blum – Guitar on 8
- David Henry – Cello on 5 & 8
- John Painter – Flugelhorn on 2 & 6
- Sam Smith – Drums on 3

=== Tracks 7, 9, 10, 11 ===
- Guitar, Keyboards, Lap Steel, and Vibes – Joe Pisapia
- Bass – James "Hags" Haggerty
- Drums – Marc Pisapia

==== Additional musicians ====
- David Henry – Cello on 10
- Katie Cook, Allison Pierce, & Catherine Pierce – Backing Vocals on 11

== About the CD ==
Look Around is Anthony Rapp's first CD.

== About the Songs ==
A few of the songs deal with the death of Rapp's mother including "Always", and "Visits to You".

== About the Music Video ==
There is a music video of "Out Out Damn Spot". It can be viewed when the CD is put in a computer.
