= HouseBroken =

American adult animated sitcom

- Genre: Animated sitcom
- Created by: Gabrielle Allan; Jennifer Crittenden; Clea DuVall
- Voices of: Lisa Kudrow; Clea DuVall; Nat Faxon; Will Forte; Tony Hale; Sharon Horgan; Jason Mantzoukas; Sam Richardson
- Music by: Curtis Moore; Frank Ciampi
- Country of origin: United States
- Original language: English
- No. of seasons: 2
- No. of episodes: 30

Production
- Executive producers: Gabrielle Allan & Jennifer Crittenden; Clea DuVall; Sharon Horgan; Clelia Mountford; Dana Honor; Aaron Kaplan; Melanie Frankel; Dave Jeser & Matt Silverstein
- Producers: Chris Encell; Shana Gohd; Ann Kim
- Editors: Ryan Wick; Adam Redding; Justin Zev Rose
- Running time: 21 minutes
- Production companies: Kapital Entertainment; Bento Box Entertainment; Merman; AllenDen

Original release
- Network: Fox
- Release: May 31, 2021 – August 6, 2023

HouseBroken is an American animated sitcom created by Jennifer Crittenden, Clea DuVall, and Gabrielle Allan that aired on Fox from May 31, 2021 to August 6, 2023. In August 2021, the series was renewed for a second season which premiered on December 4, 2022. The show reunited Nat Faxon and Sharon Horgan in roles similar to their characters in Disenchantment.

In May 2024, the series was canceled after two seasons due to low ratings.

== Plot ==
HouseBroken centers around a group of pets residing in Los Angeles who all take part in an all-animal therapy group, led by Honey, a poodle whose owner is a therapist and thus has rubbed off on her. Told from the perspective of the animals, each one having various issues that usually stem from their owners, the show details the various adventures they go on to resolve their problems.

== Voice cast ==
The main characters of HouseBroken (clockwise from top) Chief, Tabitha, The Gray One, Brice, Max, Elsa, Bubbles, Honey, Diablo, Tchotchke, and Shel

=== Main ===
- Lisa Kudrow as Honey, a Standard Poodle mix who opens her living room for the group to come and support each other. Honey also struggles with her own problems, such as mourning the death of her best friend Big Cookie and her arranged (by her human) marriage with Chief.
- Clea DuVall as Elsa, a power-hungry, know-it-all Corgi and service dog in training — or so she claims — who drives Honey crazy. Her owner is a neglectful and oblivious young woman who only put a service vest on Elsa so that she can get away with or do things that are considered illegal without repercussions.
- Nat Faxon as
  - Chief, a sloppy and unintelligent St. Bernard and Honey's mate who enjoys eating socks, playing in mud, and licking himself.
  - Nathan, a male blue-and-yellow macaw who is very pretentious and selfish, and enjoys tormenting others.
  - Kevin, Chico's neglectful owner. His ex-girlfriend left Chico behind when they broke up and has been with Chico ever since. Kevin worked as a flight attendant until he was fired. He's ironically revealed to be part of the Furry fandom in season 2.
- Will Forte as Shel, a tortoise with intimacy issues and a shoe fetish. He was initially in a relationship with a single croc he names "Lindsay" and was going to marry it until his mate Darla returns after 15 years. In the episode "Who Are You?", it is revealed that Shel lives with other animals but never talks about them to the group due to his narcissism. His youngest owner goes to the same elementary school Nibbles lives at. He then gets into a polyamorous relationship with Darla and Lindsay. In the episode "Who's a Bad Girl? (Part 1)", it is revealed Lindsay belongs to Xavier, Shel's original owner who forgot the shoe when he went to college. The shoe was never mentioned again after that aside from a flashback in the season 2 episode "Who Got Burned?". Both Shel and Darla become parents in season 2.
- Tony Hale as
  - Diablo, an anxious, sweater-wearing mixed-breed Terrier with OCD. He became Big Cookie's replacement in the session group. His owners are divorced and share joint custody of him. However, in "Who Are You?", his owners decide to let him pick his forever home, and he ultimately decides to live with his "father." His "mother" is revealed to be Jewish in season 2 as he both wears Christmas and Hanukkah-themed clothing. A running gag involves him being mistaken for other species.
  - Max, George Clooney's Berkshire Pig, a former actor and current status obsessed narcissist. He is named after George Clooney's real life pig who died in 2006. This is brought up in the episode "Who Are You?" when Max realizes there was another pig named Max before him and is essentially his replacement. In the episode "Who's a Bad Girl? (Part 1)", he is sent to live with Ray Liotta. In season 2, he starts living with David Spade.
- Sharon Horgan as Tabitha, a 15-year-old Persian cat and a retired beauty queen, trying to adjust to life off the cat show circuit. She speaks with a Russian accent. She initially lives with her owners Stelios and Brett and a younger cat named Kit-Kat. In the fourth episode, consumed by jealousy at her owners giving more attention to Kit-Kat than they do to her, she runs away from home and starts living at a cat cafe. Tabitha eventually hates it after someone at the cafe tried to catnap her and starts living with The Gray One and other cats in the seventh episode. Tabitha and The Gray One become a couple in the ninth episode. She eventually reunites with her owners in the tenth episode.
- Jason Mantzoukas as The Gray One, a street-smart Russian Blue who lives with about forty or sixty other cats and has a crush on Tabitha who wouldn't give him the time of day. He is missing an eye and riddled with diseases. His owner is Madge, an old cat lady, and hoarder who never leaves her house except when she participates in cat shows. The Gray One and Tabitha become a couple in the ninth episode.
- Sam Richardson as Chico, a chunky, co-dependent and very naive fat tabby cat. He considers his owner Kevin to be his best friend though his feelings for him are more than platonic. In the episode "Who's a Good Therapist?", it is revealed that he is pregnant and gave birth to eight kittens during a therapy session which Elsa was in charge of. His kittens were given away for adoption in the episode "Who's Getting Cold Feet?" It also turns out his pregnancy was the result of him mating with a male cat. In the season 1 finale "Who's a Bad Girl? (Part 2)", it is revealed his owner is a flight attendant and Chico actually belonged to Kevin's ex-girlfriend, Dana, before she abandoned him. In the episode "Who's a Homeowner", it's revealed that Chico's original name was Prince, and used to live with a man named Lonnie, who turns out to be a serial killer.
- Tchotchke, a slow loris who is the only main character who does not speak, but communicates via body language and a cocktail umbrella, which he appears to have an attachment to. He lives in Jill's shed. In the second season episode "Who's a Scaredy Cat?", it is revealed that Tchotchke was owned by Canadian singer Justin Bieber, who then abandoned him. He, and a group of exotic pets who were abandoned by their owners, live in Jill's basement.

=== Recurring ===
- Maria Bamford as
  - Jill, Honey and Chief's human owner. She works as a therapist.
  - Darla, Shel's mate who returned after she was missing for 15 years.
  - Small Fun Raccoon, one of Raccoon's friends.
- Greta Lee as Bubbles, a horny, teenage goldfish who lives with Honey and Chief. She heckles the other animals. It is revealed in the episode "Who Are You?" that she is not the first Bubbles. Bubbles' role is significantly reduced in season 2 as she mostly has non-speaking appearances.
- Bresha Webb as Nibbles, a psychopathic hamster who is mourning the loss of her mate (whom she killed). She is a classroom pet for a third grade classroom.
- Brian Tyree Henry as Armando, a wild coyote who Honey has a crush on.
- Timothy Simons as Raccoon, a wild raccoon that loves the outdoors, and willing to show everyone that they have their wild sides inside.
- Michaela Dietz as Kit-Kat, a cat that lives with Tabitha. Initially non-speaking, she gains a more prominent speaking role in season 2. Kit-Kat starts out as a kitten but is aged-up to the feline equivalent of a teenager in season 2.

=== Guest ===
- Dax Shepard and Kristen Bell as Rutabaga and Juliet, respectively, an ideal dog couple that Honey is jealous of.
- Anna Faris as Lil' Bunny, an Afghan Hound, and the dog of a social media influencer who Honey befriends in an epic game of frisbee on the beach.
  - Faris has also voiced Chartreuse in "Who's a Good Therapist?".
- Sarah Cooper as Lenny
- Nicole Byer as Larrabee
- Ben Schwartz as Brice, an Unnamed cat, and Bunny Paul.
- Cathy Moriarty (Season 1) and Kathleen Turner (Season 2) as Nancy, Nathan's owner and Jill's mother, who openly despises the latter.
- Nicole Sullivan as Little Cookie, the new puppy of Jill's neighbors.
  - Others
- Paul F. Tompkins as Ray Liotta
- David Spade as Himself
- Donald Faison as Illinois James
- Phil LaMarr and Maddie Corman as Guernico and Caravaggio
- Mary Holland as Ruby
- Jimmy Tatro as Trey
- Pedro Pascal as Claude
- Fred Armisen as DJ
- Natasha Lyonne as Oliver
- Julia Louis-Dreyfus as Boaracle
- Brie Larson as Bowie
- James McAvoy as Stan
- Melanie Lynskey as Pinky
- Cynthia Erivo as Ferris
- Nicole Richie as Mama Cass
- Molly Ringwald as Milly
- Bowen Yang as Lonnie Shenkman
- Steve-O as Banshee
- Andrew Rannells as Ennis
- Thomas Lennon as Pony Ferrari

== Episodes ==
=== Series overview ===
Season	Episodes	Originally released	
Season	Episodes	First released	Last released
1	11	May 31, 2021	August 30, 2021
2	19	December 4, 2022	August 6, 2023

=== Season 1 (2021) ===
No. overall	No. in season	Title	Directed by	Written by	Original release date	Prod. code	U.S. viewers (millions)
1	1	"Who's a Good Girl?"	Mark Kirkland	Jennifer Crittenden & Gabrielle Allan & Clea DuVall	May 31, 2021	1BBHB01	0.99
Honey makes a bad decision when she chooses to immediately replace the deceased Big Cookie with a new dog named Diablo in her pet therapy group, despite protests from the other members. Meanwhile, Shel finally finds love after 15 years of searching - his new partner being a croc he names Lindsay.
2	2	"Who Did This?"	Jackson Turcotte	John Levenstein	June 7, 2021	1BBHB02	0.97
When Honey gets an ugly haircut at the groomers, she refuses to leave the house, but ends up taking a dump on the kitchen floor because she didn't go out to use the bathroom. Chico is delighted when the Gray One strikes up a friendship with him, but soon suspects it's just for his food, while Diablo causes uproar within the group when he bites the infant son of his female owner's new boyfriend.
3	3	"Who's Wild?"	Jake Hollander	Ethan Sandler	June 14, 2021	1BBHB04	0.98
Honey feels the group is bored with their usual routine and invites a raccoon in to help spice things up, but he causes havoc with his devotion to his wild nature that lands the Gray One in the animal shelter. Elsewhere, Tabitha is upset when her owners start feeding her senior cat food, and her attempt to show them she still has some youth left in her ends up getting her stuck in a tree.
4	4	"Who's a Good Therapist?"	Jackson Turcotte	Ali Waller	June 21, 2021	1BBHB05	0.97
Honey and Chief are boarded while Jill goes on vacation; Diablo is sent there too as a punishment for biting his owners' baby in "Who Did This?" While there, Honey becomes jealous of a seemingly perfect couple, who have been inseparable since birth, and it strains her own relationship with Chief. Meanwhile, Elsa takes over the group in Honey's absence and deals with the others' problems: Chico's stomach cramps turn out to be the result of a pregnancy he failed to notice, The Grey One gets a new girlfriend, and Tabitha runs away from home after feeling ignored by her owners.
5	5	"Who's Afraid of Boomsday?"	Eric Koenig	Elliott Kalan	June 28, 2021	1BBHB08	0.86
On the 4th of July, which the dogs mistake for "Boomsday" and have a fear of, Honey and Chief are taken to the beach; Honey becomes friends with a traveling dog who resembles the late Big Cookie, while Chief gets lost and is worshipped by a cult of sea lions. Meanwhile, Elsa begins to question her abilities as a service dog when her vest is outed as a fake, and the cats fight off a gang of seagulls in order to access a dumpster behind a seafood restaurant.
6	6	"Who's Getting Cold Feet?"	Mike Morris	Christopher Encell	July 12, 2021	1BBHB06	0.83
Honey reluctantly agrees to officiate the wedding between Shel and Lindsay, while also hosting the latter's bachelorette party with the girls and Diablo. Meanwhile, the guys have a much wilder bachelor party by licking a toad. While stoned, Shel comes to a realization that maybe his marriage isn't the right thing to do, but once sober, he nearly marries Lindsay anyway. However, his long-lost lover Darla suddenly appears, leaving him confused.
7	7	"Who's Going to the Vet?"	Mike Morris	John Levenstein	July 19, 2021	1BBHB09	0.94
Chief is brought to the vet after eating Jill's vibrator. During the visit, Honey tries to persuade him to join her group, but he refuses, only to change his mind when he begins to bond with several other pets, forming his own therapy group. This upsets Honey, who was hoping he would join hers instead. Meanwhile, Max attempts to "kill" Lindsay so Shel and Darla can rekindle their love, though when she somehow comes back, they agree to go polyamorous. Tabitha reluctantly agrees to move into The Gray One's residence, but learns that she has to partake in the cats' musical numbers in order to fit in. And after having a nightmare about The Gray One and his friends as zombie cats exampling what would happen if she doesn't join, she accepts the invitation.
8	8	"Who Are You?"	Amber Hollinger	Neil Goldman & Garrett Donovan	August 9, 2021	1BBHB10	0.88
Diablo is taken in by his "father", who allows him to behave as he pleases. Honey becomes jealous of this lifestyle, especially after Coyote (whom she now names Armando) invites her to run away with his pack. Nibbles tries to free a mouse from a snake, who happens to be one of Shel's housemates. Max discovers he is just a replacement for George Clooney's late original pig, while The Grey One teaches Tabitha to be more empathetic.
9	9	"Who Done It?"	Eric Koenig	Clea DuVall	August 16, 2021	1BBHB11	0.84
Jill's mother pays a visit alongside her pet bird, Nathan, who does not like Honey. During a brief power outage, a tree branch barricades everyone inside the house, while Nathan's cage is tipped over and he is presumed dead. All the animals try to figure out who is responsible for it, all the while resolving the drama amongst themselves and trying to avoid being discovered by the humans. Eventually, Honey lies about having killed Nathan, who reveals himself to be alive, having faked his own death in order to prove how incompetent the other pets are. Raccoon confronts Honey about taking the blame for a murder she didn't commit, and when she confesses that she's still crushing on Armando, he agrees to keep her secret, on the condition that he gets to live in the shed year-round.
10	10	"Who's a Bad Girl? (Part 1)"	Mike Morris	Jennifer Crittenden & Gabrielle Allan	August 23, 2021	1BBHB12	0.86
Jill buys a puppy for Big Cookie's owners, which they name "Li'l Cookie" in her honor, and Honey and Chief try to bond with her, but Honey ends up as a third wheel. George Clooney moves to London and Max is sent to live with a different celebrity, while Diablo ruins Elsa's chance to grab the attention of another dog she has a crush on. The Gray One notices Tabitha is upset and fears it is because he accidentally called her ugly, but it turns out to be because she is homesick, while Shel's human Xavier returns from college and Lindsay is discovered to belong to him. The first part ends with Max's new owner planning to cook him, Lindsay causing Xavier to unknowingly run over Shel, Tabitha returning to her old home at the Gray One's urging, and Honey accepting Armando's offer to run away with him.
11	11	"Who's a Bad Girl? (Part 2)"	Amber Hollinger	Jennifer Crittenden & Gabrielle Allan & Clea DuVall	August 30, 2021	1BBHB13	0.89
Honey has a wild night with Armando, but has second thoughts upon learning that she has to kill in order to find food. She ultimately decides to return home, but upon telling Chief what happened, he leaves in a rage, only to become friends with Armando as well. Meanwhile Shel is revealed to have survived his accident, Elsa starts a short-lived romance with Diablo, and Chico confronts Kevin about neglecting him, to which he agrees to treat him better despite not understanding what he said. Later, the rest of the gang sets out to find Chief, but gets cornered by Armando's pack. Honey distracts them with her mediation skills, allowing the group to escape, and the season ends with business resuming as usual.

=== Season 2 (2022–23) ===
No. overall	No. in season	Title	Directed by	Written by	Original release date	Prod. code	U.S. viewers (millions)
12	1	"Who's Found Themselves in One of Those Magical Christmas Life Swap Switcheroos?"	Tom King	Dave Jeser & Matt Silverstein	December 4, 2022	2BBHB06	0.86
After Nathan's latest prank sends Honey to the vet, she wishes for a family more like her just before she is sedated. In her sleep, she is accidentally swapped out with another poodle, Lady Capulet, who hits it off with Chief due to their shared habits. Honey ends up with the Van Ambergs, a family of intellectuals who strictly discipline their own dogs. Both love these new setups at first, but start to miss their old lives. With the help of the other pets, Chief soon realizes that this new dog isn't Honey after all. Meanwhile, Max has been taken in by David Spade, but when he learns that he intends to use him as the Christmas ham, he tries to find a new home. After a series of accidents, he, Honey, and Chief all wind up at the vet together alongside their owners. As the dogs go back to their old lives, Spade swears not to eat Max, having grown attached to him, and also starts to date Jill.
13	2	"Who's Having a Merry Trashmas?"	Eric Koenig	Danny Zuker	December 4, 2022	2BBHB07	0.69
After waking up to an empty "Trashmas" (the day when the trash bins are all left out for the garbage man), Honey and Chief discover that Jill went on a trip without them. With help from Raccoon, they end up having to fight back Home Alone-style as an intruder enters the house, who turns out to just be the dog-walker. Jill comes home and takes the blame for the mess, assuming her dogs were acting up because she left without saying goodbye. Meanwhile, The Gray One and Chico head out in search of a suitable Trashmas feast after Tabitha refuses to let them eat with her; Elsa forms a short relationship with a robotic toy dog; and Diablo helps Shel reconcile with Darla, who would like his help in watching their egg clutch in the woods.
14	3	"Who's Obsessed? (A Lifetime Original)"	Eric Koenig	Clea DuVall	March 26, 2023	2BBHB02	0.61
Chief and Elsa are enrolled in the same dog-walking group, where the latter attempts to make some female friends. Although the female dog clique rejects her, she makes small talk with an Irish Setter named Ruby (Mary Holland), who is only using her to get close to Chief and get rid of Honey. Meanwhile, Chico feels alone without Kevin around, but befriends Trey (Jimmy Tatro), a flea he got while visiting The Gray One; things quickly get out of hand when he invites his pals over, getting Chico kicked out of the group and nearly draining all his blood.
15	4	"Who's a Scaredy Cat?"	Eric Koenig	Dave Jeser & Matt Silverstein	April 2, 2023	3BBHB05	0.55
Honey leads most of the group into the basement to help Diablo get over his fear of basement monsters, but they end up getting trapped in the process. Meanwhile, Chico and The Gray One stow away on Kevin's flight to see why he abandons the former so often; and Chief has a bark-off with a thunderstorm, which he mistakes for a dog in the sky.
16	5	"Who's a Homeowner?"	Damil Bryant	Garrett Donovan	May 7, 2023	3BBHB09	0.62
Honey and Chief let their new, fancy status go to their heads after Jill upgrades their dog house; Chico is reunited with his previous owner, who turns out to be a serial killer; and Tabitha gets her fur burnt off and catches the eye of a local sphinx cat.
17	6	"Who's Trippin'?"	Tom King	Peter Kim & Danny Zuker	May 14, 2023	3BBHB10	0.54
When Jill gains the ability to speak to animals after doing ayahuasca, Honey wants to understand her on a more personal level, but her efforts are derailed when Chief enlists them both to help him find his real mother. Meanwhile, another stoner mistakes The Gray One for her late husband reincarnated.
18	7	"Who's the Boss?"	Tom King	Neil Goldman & Garrett Donovan	May 21, 2023	2BBHB03	0.54
Diablo gets testicular implants, granting him the confidence to leave the group and become king of the dog park. Meanwhile, The Gray One helps Tabitha rein in Kit Kat, the younger, more rebellious cat whom she shares owners with.
19	8	"Who's Nocturnal?"	Eric Koenig	Scott Gairdner	May 28, 2023	2BBHB04	0.43
Honey loses track of a litter of baby possums that Chief promised to look after, so she and The Gray One set out to find them. Meanwhile, Shel and Nibbles team up to find out who keeps defecating on the former's back.
20	9	"Who's Married?"	Damil Bryant	Rachel Leavitt & Jon Stahl	May 28, 2023	3BBHB06	0.40
Honey and Chief decide to make their "marriage" more open by playing with other dogs, but things get complicated when they both bond with the same canine. Tabitha helps Chico hunt down the perfect bird to give Kevin for their anniversary. Nibbles attempts to reconnect with one of the kids in her class after being spoiled by her.
21	10	"Who Got Burned?"	Damil Bryant	Neil Goldman & Garrett Donovan	June 4, 2023	2BBHB05	0.46
A wildfire forces the group to stay at an elementary school evacuation center. Honey tries to make amends with Chico, who abandoned group during the fire and has become a high school bully to cover up his own abandonment issues. Shel falls for a sea tortoise. The Gray One stands by his human, who refuses to leave their home despite it being in the fire's path.
22	11	"Who's Getting Up There?"	Tom King	Ann Kim	June 4, 2023	3BBHB04	0.49
Chief has a midlife crisis and starts hanging out with his new daredevil dog friend in order to feel young again. Tabitha is taken to her first cat show in years, only to learn that she isn't there to compete. Diablo becomes a purse dog and makes some new, elite friends.
23	12	"Who's Afraid of Boomsday Again?"	Eric Koenig	Gabrielle Allan & Jennifer Crittenden	July 9, 2023 (Note: "Who's Afraid of Boomsday Again?" was released on Fox.com and Hulu on June 5, 2023.)	3BBHB11	0.34
Jill gives Honey and Chief a sedative to help them through the Fourth of July fireworks, causing them both to have strange dreams set in a world with bipedal animals but no humans. Honey goes on a tumultuous road trip, while Chief lobbies to have fireworks outlawed federally.
24	13	"Who's God?"	Damil Bryant	Elliott Kalan	July 9, 2023	2BBHB01	0.32
Chief assumes the shocks from his new collar are messages from God and decides to spread the gospel. Nibbles and Tabitha agree to commit each other's murders. Max is cast in a role intended for his owner, David Spade.
25	14	"Who's the Birthday Girl?"	Damil Bryant	Nadiya Chettiar	July 23, 2023	1BBHB07	0.41
Honey has to deal with her obnoxious family while celebrating her birthday. Meanwhile, The Gray One acts as Raccoon's wingman while he flirts with a koala at the zoo.
26	15	"Who Ain't Afraid of No Ghosts?"	Tom King	Elliott Kalan	July 23, 2023	3BBHB01	0.36
Honey finds herself between life and death, and is implored to relay messages to her friends from the ghosts of various dead pets. Meanwhile, Diablo falls in love with the mate of a squirrel he killed.
27	16	"Who's a Party Pony?"	Damil Bryant	Ethan Sandler	July 30, 2023	3BBHB03	0.43
Honey and Shel travel to an animal sanctuary to locate Shel's estranged father, where she also learns what has become of one of her old patients. Meanwhile, Chico challenges Darla to see who can be a better parent.
28	17	"Who's the Cat-Chelorette?"	Eric Koenig	Shana Gohd	July 30, 2023	3BBHB08	0.46
The Gray One fights the many other cats in his home for his owner's love via a competition similar to The Bachelorette. Honey miraculously converses with an unknown creature through her post-surgery cone. Max enters Shel in a tortoise race.
29	18	"Who's a Mole?"	Tom King	Vincent Brown	August 6, 2023	3BBHB07	0.34
Someone in the group starts to spill everyone's secrets, and Honey tries to find the mole. The Gray One fights for the opportunity to sleep on top of his owner's microwave. Chief refuses to take his UTI pills, convinced something better will come.
30	19	"Who's a Winner?"	Eric Koenig	Clea DuVall	August 6, 2023	3BBHB02	0.32
Honey gets overly competitive after getting sent to a herding camp with Chief. Max has an existential crisis after he visits a farm to method act for an upcoming role. Elsa must come to terms with a horrible mistake she made in the past.

== Production ==
=== Development ===
The show's early working title was Therapy Dog. On December 19, 2019, Fox ordered the show to series. HouseBroken is created by Clea DuVall, Jennifer Crittenden, and Gabrielle Allan who were expected to executive produce alongside Sharon Horgan, Clelia Mountford, Aaron Kaplan, and Dana Honor. On August 9, 2021, Fox renewed the series for a second season. On May 10, 2024, Fox canceled the series after two seasons, as the viewership was not as strong as the network had hoped.

=== Casting ===
Alongside the initial series announcement, Lisa Kudrow, Clea DuVall, Nat Faxon, Will Forte, Tony Hale, Sharon Horgan, Jason Mantzoukas, and Sam Richardson were cast as series regulars.

== Broadcast ==
HouseBroken premiered on May 31, 2021, on Fox. In Canada, it airs on CTV 2. In Australia, it streams on Paramount+. The second season premiered on December 4, 2022, with two Christmas-themed episodes and resumed on March 26, 2023.

== Reception ==
=== Critical response ===
On review aggregator Rotten Tomatoes, the series holds an approval rating of 50% based on 10 critic reviews, with an average rating of 4.5/10. The website's critics consensus reads, "Housebroken boasts an insanely talented voice cast—if only its basic writing would learn some new narrative tricks." However, Metacritic gave it a weighted average score of 66 out of 100, based on 7 critics, indicating "generally favorable reviews".

=== Ratings ===
==== Season 1 ====
Viewership and ratings per episode of HouseBroken
No.	Title	Air date	Rating (18–49)	Viewers (millions)	DVR (18–49)	DVR viewers (millions)	Total (18–49)	Total viewers (millions)
1	"Who's a Good Girl?"	May 31, 2021	0.3	0.99	0.1	0.24	0.4	1.23
2	"Who Did This?"	June 7, 2021	0.3	0.97	0.1	0.15	0.3	1.12
3	"Who's Wild?"	June 14, 2021	0.3	0.98	0.1	0.18	0.3	1.16
4	"Who's a Good Therapist?"	June 21, 2021	0.3	0.97	0.1	0.16	0.3	1.13
5	"Who's Afraid of Boomsday?"	June 28, 2021	0.3	0.86	0.1	0.16	0.3	1.04
6	"Who's Getting Cold Feet?"	July 12, 2021	0.3	0.83	0.1	0.17	0.3	1.00
7	"Who's Going to the Vet?"	July 19, 2021	0.3	0.94	0.1	0.19	0.4	1.13
8	"Who Are You?"	August 9, 2021	0.3	0.88	0.0	0.14	0.3	1.02
9	"Who Done It?"	August 16, 2021	0.3	0.84	0.0	0.15	0.3	0.99
10	"Who's a Bad Girl? (Part 1)"	August 23, 2021	0.2	0.86	—N/a	—N/a	—N/a	—N/a
11	"Who's a Bad Girl? (Part 2)"	August 30, 2021	0.2	0.89	—N/a	—N/a	—N/a	—N/a

==== Season 2 ====
Viewership and ratings per episode of HouseBroken
No.	Title	Air date	Rating (18–49)	Viewers (millions)	DVR (18–49)	DVR viewers (millions)	Total (18–49)	Total viewers (millions)
1	"Who's Found Themselves in One of Those Magical Christmas Life Swap Switcheroos?"	December 4, 2022	0.3	0.86	0.0	0.10	0.3	0.96
2	"Who's Having a Merry Trashmas?"	December 4, 2022	0.2	0.69	0.0	0.09	0.2	0.78

No DVR ratings are available after the second episode.

=== Accolades ===
The series was nominated for Best Limited Series Animated Television/Media Production at the 50th Annie Awards.
