= Psych: The Musical =

- Psych episodes
- DVD cover art
- Episode nos.: Season 7 Episodes 15/16
- Directed by: Steve Franks
- Written by: Steve Franks
- Original air date: December 15, 2013
- Running time: 88 minutes

Guest appearances
- Anthony Rapp as Z; Barry Bostwick as Armitage; Brooke Lyons as Elisa; Geoff Gustafson as Chris Lamberth; Donavon Stinson as Ben Skyler; Ally Sheedy as Mr. Yang; Jimmi Simpson as Mary Lightly; Kurt Fuller as Woody; Peter Chelsom as The Narrator; Sage Brocklebank as Buzz McNab; Hrothgar Mathews as Park Loner; Shawn Macdonald as Miles Thornton

Episode chronology
← Previous "No Trout About It"	Next → "Lock, Stock, Some Smoking Barrels and Burton Guster's Goblet of Fire"
- Psych season 7

"Psych: The Musical" is an episode of the seventh season of Psych and the 110th episode in the series overall. Formatted as a musical, it aired as a two-hour event, using up episodes 15 and 16 of the season order. The episode aired on December 15, 2013.

Steve Franks wrote and directed the episode, including creating the lyrics for original songs. The episode was many years in the making, promised to fans early on and delayed. It was finally produced in October 2012.

== Production ==
Steve Franks was attached to write and direct Psych’s musical episode from many years prior to its completion. Franks made slow progress on writing and struggled to get the episode to production. Originally slated to air in the show's sixth season, the episode was pushed to the seventh. It was later announced that the episode would air as a two-hour special with original songs written by Steve Franks. Steve Franks and composer Adam Cohen wrote the original songs featured in the special. Franks wrote the script and directed the episode. Filling the order of two episodes, it went into production for 14 days in October 2012, given no more production time than normal episodes. There was a special screening in San Diego, CA, on July 17, 2013, for fans preceding Psych’s Comic-Con panel the following day. Announced as "Psych: The Musical," the episode aired December 15, 2013. Later, it was announced that Ally Sheedy would reprise her role as Mr. Yang. The episode features fourteen original songs.

== Plot ==
The plot deals with a criminally insane playwright named Zachary Zander, who goes by his pen name Z. The episode takes the format of a normal episode of Psych, intermittent with original songs. "Psych: The Musical" takes place before the events of "Deez Nups", the seventh episode of season 7, putting it out of chronological order from the rest of the season. As a result, there are several continuity errors throughout the special.

=== Act I ===
The episode begins with a whimsical storybook opening, followed by the opening number. Six years before the events of the episode, Z's play about Jack the Ripper is abruptly canceled and he is sent to a mental institution. Before the premiere of his play, Z had allegedly set the theater on fire and locked a critic in a back room. After six years, a similar play is in production at a different Santa Barbara theater by its womanizing owner Armitage. Z escapes his mental institution and presumably murdered another man. Psychic Shawn Spencer (James Roday Rodriguez), his partner Burton "Gus" Guster (Dulé Hill), and Santa Barbara Police Department Detectives Juliet O'Hara (Maggie Lawson) and Carlton Lassiter (Timothy Omundson) go to the mental institution and elicit the help of serial killer Mr. Yang. While Shawn and Gus are investigating Armitage's new production, producer Miles Thornton falls from the catwalk and dies. At the coroner's office, Woody labels the death a suicide, but Lassiter and Juliet still think Z may have killed him. Shawn suspects that Z's next target is likely Elisa, his muse and a cast member of his original play. Officer Buzz McNab is put on guard at Elisa's house, and he notifies Lassiter when he sees a man running through the woods of her property. Lassiter, Juliet, Shawn, Gus, Yang, and her guard rush to the house, where Lassiter and Juliet chase the mysterious man. The man is revealed to be the same man that was thought to have been killed by Z upon his escape from the mental institution. Shawn and Gus see Z inside Elisa's house and break inside. Shawn chases Z out of the house, and upon seeing him face-to-face becomes convinced that Z is innocent. Upon returning to the car, Mr. Yang has escaped as well.

=== Act II ===
Following another whimsical storybook opening, and during a briefing at the SBPD station, Shawn accepts a Skype video call from Mr. Yang. She reveals that he should look again in the mental institution. Shawn and Gus find numerous letters from Z to Elisa hidden inside a bed. Shawn and Gus meet up with Lassiter and Juliet, who are at the scene of Elisa's dead body. When they catch Armitage kissing a cast member at his theater, they chase him until he is hit by an oncoming car. He admits to several extramarital affairs, including one with Elisa. After another Skype call with Mr. Yang, Shawn and Gus identify her location as the burnt theater of Z's original production. When they arrive, they find Mr. Yang, who informs them that they have been followed there. A disguised person hangs Shawn by the neck with a rope and stabs Yang with her own knife, but not before she cuts Shawn free. He and Gus rush to her side as she dies. She is welcomed to the afterlife by criminal expert Mary Lightly, who promises to try to help her get into Heaven. Shawn and Gus go to the premiere of Armitage's play to confront cast member Chris Lamberth, whom they suspect is the killer. After Lamberth is knocked out in the altercation, Shawn dresses in his costume and performs his part in the play. During the performance, he realizes the true killer is director Ben Skyler and trades places with Gus. Shawn chases down Z, who is attempting to kill Skyler for framing him for the critic's murder (Thornton, Ben's accomplice in the crime, really did commit suicide out of guilt) and for murdering Elisa. Lassiter and Juliet arrive at an opportune moment and Z surrenders. Z is institutionalized, and Shawn and Gus pitch their interpretation of the events to him before scattering Yang's ashes in the chief doctor's car (which was her last request).

== Musical numbers ==
1. Santa Barbara Skies - Shawn, Gus and Dancers
2. Z’s Lament - Z
3. I’ve Heard It Both Ways - Shawn, Lassiter and Juliet
4. Sleigh Bells and Songs - Mr. Yang
5. (When You’re) Making up a Song - Shawn, Juliet, Gus, Mr. Yang and Lassiter
6. Often It’s the Opposite Part One - Woody, Lassiter and Juliet
7. Often It’s the Opposite Part Two - Woody
8. I Hurt No One - Z and Shawn
9. I’ve Heard It Both Ways Reprise One - Lassiter
10. Santa Barbara Skies Reprise - Juliet, Lassiter and Karen
11. I’ve Heard It Both Ways Reprise Two - Shawn, Lassiter and Juliet
12. Promised Land - Mary and Mr. Yang
13. The Breakdown - Shawn and Z
14. Gus in the Spotlight - Gus
15. The Surrender - Z
16. Jamaican Inspector - Gus

== Reception ==
=== Ratings ===
"Psych: The Musical" was viewed by 2.23 million Americans during its original airing.

=== Critical response ===
The special received mixed reviews. TV Fanatic's Chandel Charles gave the episode a five stars out of five rating, saying, "This songfest, however, was beyond all expectations." Kevin McFarland of The A.V. Club said that it "feels like only half of an adventure, even after two hours and plenty of references to musical titles" and gave the episode a C rating.

== Home media release ==
=== DVD ===
The episode was released on DVD separately from the seventh season on December 17, 2013, just two days after airing. The set features an extended scene, as well as three other Psych episodes with musical themes: "American Duos," "High Top Fade-Out," and "Feet Don't Kill Me Now." Also included is a CD of six original songs.

The special is also included as a bonus feature on the DVD set of Psych: The Complete Eighth Season, along with the extended scene and a new behind-the-scenes feature.

=== Soundtrack ===
A digital soundtrack album Psych: The Musical (Original Songs and Score) was released on December 16, 2013 on iTunes and other digital music services. The seventeen tracks are as follows:

1. Santa Barbara Skies (5:12)
2. Z’s Lament (1:13)
3. I’ve Heard It Both Ways (3:13)
4. Sleigh Bells and Songs (1:12)
5. (When You’re) Making up a Song (2:02)
6. Often It’s the Opposite (1:42)
7. Into the Woods / I Hurt No One (2:32)
8. Act II Storybook Open (1:07)
9. I’ve Heard It Both Ways Reprise One (1:06)
10. Under Santa Barbara Skies Reprise (2:10)
11. I’ve Heard It Both Ways Reprise Two (0:55)
12. It’s Her (2:12)
13. Promised Land (2:20)
14. Shawn Hears the Theme / The Breakdown (3:41)
15. Gus in the Spotlight (1:04)
16. The Surrender (1:45)
17. Jamaican Inspector (1:47)
