= Without You (book) =

2006 memoir by musical theater actor Anthony Rapp

Without You: A Memoir of Love, Loss, and the Musical Rent
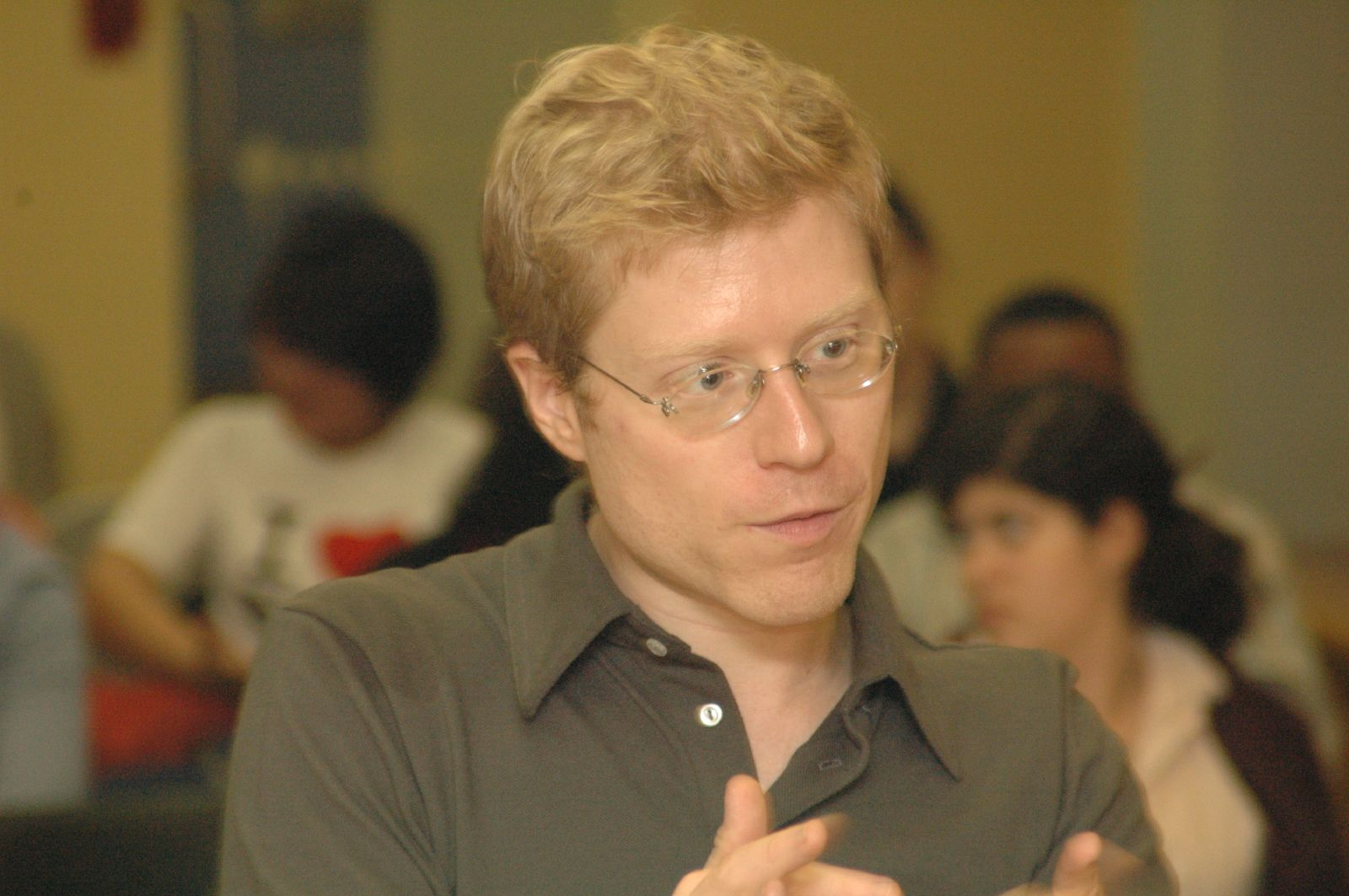
- Author: Anthony Rapp
- Language: English
- Genre: Memoir
- Publisher: Simon & Schuster Paperbacks
- Publication date: 2006
- Publication place: United States
- Media type: Print (paperback)
- Pages: 309
- ISBN: 0-7432-6976-4

Without You: A Memoir of Love, Loss, and the Musical Rent is a 2006 memoir by a musical theater actor, Anthony Rapp. Later it was turned into a staged musical adaptation by the same name.

== Memoir ==
The book recalls events of the life of Anthony Rapp in relation to the musical Rent (the show that gave Rapp his big break), its writer, Jonathan Larson, as well as the death of Rapp's mother by breast cancer. As a debut writer, Rapp takes the reader behind the scenes of his own life and his own struggles he came in contact with. The original print release contains photographs of his family, friends, and his own experiences. The book's title comes from one of Rent's musical numbers. The book was released October 31, 2006 under Simon & Schuster Publishing. The song's theme deals with losing someone, which is where Rapp was inspired to write this memoir.

=== Book reviews ===
Reviews across the board have been mixed but mostly positive. Books World credits Rapp for adding a new artistic form to his own repertoire saying his work is “simultaneously unique and universal.” Entertainment Weekly gave Rapp a relatively positive review claiming that his work is rare and refreshing. “His prose can be clunky and overwrought, but his voice is unpretentious and unfailingly honest.” Editors Weekly recognizes Rapp's ability to take the dark subjects of his life and look at the hopefully, positive side that is within. “While the book sometimes plunges too deeply into its twin themes of love and loss, Rapp recognizes the healing power of drama and theater, writing that acting is "an escape of sorts." Absorbing, warm and hopeful, the book celebrates a man, his work and a generation struggling with AIDS but determined to survive.”

== Stage adaptation ==
After the release of his book, Rapp decided to make a stage version of the show set to music and a script. This is a one man show giving the audience a visual depiction of his memoir. The show was written and performed by Rapp, featuring his own original songs, as well as numbers from the musical Rent, and covers including R.E.M.'s "Losing My Religion", which was Rapp's audition song for his role in Rent. The stage show has played at the New World Stages in Manhattan, as well as Pittsburgh, PA, Boston, MA, Edinburgh, UK, London, UK, Toronto, and Tracy, CA. Rapp recorded the soundtrack for Without You in London on September 17, 2012 following an engagement Menier Chocolate Factory in London. The recording was released on December 11, 2012. The five piece band was under the musical direction of Dan Weiss, with musical arrangements by composer Tom Kitt.

List of Tracks on the Soundtrack

- 1. Losing My Religion
- 2. RENT
- 3. "The next day, I got the good news..."
- 4. Carry Me Home
- 5. Seasons of Love
- 6. La Vie Bohème
- 7. "Mom had always loved country life..."
- 8. Wild Bill
- 9. "And for the next two years..."
- 10. "Back in New York..."
- 11. Another Day
- 12. "Nothing left unfinished..."
- 13. "A couple weeks into rehearsals..."
- 14. What You Own
- 15. "The next morning, January 5th..."
- 16. One Song Glory / Halloween
- 17. "We were moving to Broadway..."
- 18. "On my next visit home..."
- 19. Visits to You
- 20. "I found my baby book..."
- 21. Always
- 22. "The only way out is through..."
- 23. That Is Not You
- 24. "The perfect setting for her memorial..."
- 25. Without You
- 26. Seasons of Love (Finale)

=== Musical Reviews ===
Reviews for the staged show were mixed overall. The National Post claims that Rapp's staged production is more of an extension of a memorial for his mother. "Basing a public performance on private grief is a dodgy proposition, worsened in this case by the fact that Rapp has nothing to say about either person that can make them matter to anyone but him." With that being said, the National Post applauds Rapp's performance. Huffington Post published "the pace, writing and sheer passion behind this show instantly push it from your mind as you find yourself at ease with Rapps' delivery and impressive vocals as he's backed by a tight five piece band."
