= Psych season 8 =

Psych
- Season 8
- DVD cover art.
- Starring: James Roday; Dulé Hill; Timothy Omundson; Maggie Lawson; Kirsten Nelson; Corbin Bernsen
- No. of episodes: 10

Release
- Original network: USA Network
- Original release: January 8 – March 26, 2014

Season chronology
- ← Previous; Season 7 Next → The Movie

The eighth and final season of Psych, containing 10 episodes, premiered on the USA Network in the United States on January 8, 2014. James Roday, Dulé Hill, Timothy Omundson, Maggie Lawson, Corbin Bernsen and Kirsten Nelson all reprise their roles as the main characters in the series.

USA Network confirmed on February 5, 2014 that the eighth season of Psych would be its last.

== Production ==
Steve Franks continued as showrunner of the series. The song "I Know, You Know", performed by The Friendly Indians, continues to be used as the theme song for the show.

On December 19, 2012, it was announced that Psych had been renewed for an eighth season consisting of eight episodes. On April 22, 2013, USA Network ordered five additional scripts for potential episodes. On June 25, 2013, USA Network greenlit two additional episodes of those five scripts, one to be chosen by online poll between three options. During the 2013 Comic-Con in San Diego, it was revealed that "Dream Therapy", now known as "A Nightmare on State Street", won with more than 50% of the votes. Another one of the options in the vote (titled "Food Truck") was also produced and became "Shawn & Gus Truck Things Up". Season 8 premiered on January 8, 2014.

== Cast ==
James Roday continues to portray the fake psychic detective Shawn Spencer. Dulé Hill appears as Burton "Gus" Guster. Timothy Omundson and Maggie Lawson portray detectives Carlton "Lassie" Lassiter and Juliet "Jules" O'Hara, respectively. Corbin Bernsen continues as Henry Spencer, and Kirsten Nelson returns as SBPD Chief Karen Vick.

Cary Elwes returned to portray the character of Pierre Despereaux for the fourth time in the series' run. He appeared alongside Vinnie Jones in the first episode of the season. Anthony Michael Hall reprises his role as Interim Chief Harris Trout, while Kristy Swanson, Kurt Fuller and Sage Brocklebank return as Marlowe Lassiter, Woody the Coroner and Buzz McNab, respectively. John Kapelos also returns as Tom Swaggerty, the Mayor of Santa Barbara, for the sixth episode of the season, called "1967: A Psych Odyssey", that marks the directorial debut of Kirsten Nelson. Phylicia Rashad returned as Gus' mother. Curt Smith returns as himself. Mira Sorvino appears as Head Detective Betsy Brannigan.

Previous guest stars Dana Ashbrook, Katharine Isabelle, Carlos Jacott, Ed Lover, Ralph Macchio, Lindsay Sloane, Janet Varney, Alan Ruck, and Ray Wise all return to the series to guest star in the third episode of the season, a special all-star remake of the season one episode "Cloudy... With a Chance of Murder", with Michael Weston reprising his role as Adam Hornstock from the original episode.

Tom Arnold, The Bella Twins, Corbin Bleu, Yvette Nicole Brown, Dean Cameron, Bruce Campbell, Olivia d'Abo, Loretta Devine, Sutton Foster, Vincent Gale, Kali Hawk, Vinnie Jones, Val Kilmer, Floriana Lima, Peggy Lipton, Deon Richmond, Peter Stormare, Vincent Ventresca, Vincent M. Ward, Celia Weston, William Zabka and Billy Zane also guest star in different episodes of the season.

== Episodes ==
List of Psych season 8 episodes
| No. overall | No. in season | Title | Directed by | Written by | Original release date | U.S. viewers (millions) |
|---|---|---|---|---|---|---|
| 112 | 1 | "Lock, Stock, Some Smoking Barrels and Burton Guster's Goblet of Fire" | Steve Franks | Kell Cahoon & Steve Franks | January 8, 2014 | 2.28 |
Using a “Guy Ritchie” style voiceover, Shawn and Gus recount being summoned to London by Interpol to take part in an undercover sting operation against ruthless criminal Ronnie Ives (Vinnie Jones). Since Gus is more interested in attending a Harry Potter convention, he has to be strong-armed into a case yet again. They also learn that they were called in by Pierre Despereaux (Cary Elwes), who tells them he's been undercover for the last 10 years. Doubting his story, Shawn calls Lassiter for help, and he's more than happy to assist since he's been demoted. Note: This is the first episode of the show in which Corbin Bernsen does not appear and the first since the Pilot in which Maggie Lawson doesn't appear (although both are credited).
| 113 | 2 | "S.E.I.Z.E. the Day" | David Crabtree | Todd Harthan | January 15, 2014 | 1.51 |
Lassiter is in a funk since Interim Chief Harris Trout (Anthony Michael Hall) not only demoted him, but refused to give him any credit for saving his life. Shawn takes on the job of Lassiter's life coach since Trout refuses to hire him. After Lassiter learns that his wife is pregnant, he suddenly develops an extreme fear of death, which leads Shawn to believe that he's dying, all while trying to figure out who tried to kill Trout, and others like him.
| 114 | 3 | "Remake A.K.A. Cloudy... With a Chance of Improvement" | Andy Berman | Andy Berman & Todd Harthan | January 22, 2014 | 1.61 |
In a special remake episode of the series (using the first season episode "Cloudy... With a Chance of Murder") set in 2006, Shawn arrives at the courthouse to pick up his impounded motorcycle, and sees a woman (Lindsay Sloane) whom he later learns has been accused of murder. Believing that she is innocent, Shawn and Gus join struggling attorney Adam Hornstock (Michael Weston) for the defense. Previous guest stars (Alan Ruck, Ralph Macchio, Dana Ashbrook, Janet Varney, Ed Lover, and Ray Wise among others) fill in other roles from the original episode.
| 115 | 4 | "Someone's Got a Woody" | Mel Damski | Andy Berman & Saladin K. Patterson | January 29, 2014 | 1.73 |
An ex-con takes Woody hostage claiming to have been framed for murder. Woody arranges for Shawn and Gus to get involved, even though Trout wants none of their assistance. Unfortunately, Trout isn't willing to wait for long, and when it appears that he's willing to sacrifice Woody to end the siege, Lassiter and Juliet must take matters into their own hands, as well as buy Shawn time to find the truth. Once the real culprit is caught by Lassiter, Trout fires Lassiter and Juliet and refires Gus and Shawn, only to be fired himself for his recklessness.
| 116 | 5 | "COG Blocked" | Brad Turner | Carlos Jacott | February 5, 2014 | 1.79 |
Upon arriving at the scene of an apparent suicide, Gus immediately sees much of himself in the victim, who worked at an insurance company. Though Gus immediately believes it was a murder, Shawn is not entirely certain of that, but Gus forcefully takes the lead. Running into a private investigator (Kali Hawk) along the way, Shawn and Gus begin to discover why the man is dead, but the case gets even more confusing.
| 117 | 6 | "1967: A Psych Odyssey" | Kirsten Nelson | Tim Meltreger & James Roday | February 26, 2014 | 1.53 |
Everyone is delighted when Chief Vick returns, until she announces she's accepted a job in the Bay Area. Though Vick has put in a good word to Mayor Swagerty (John Kapelos) on Lassiter's behalf, Swagerty isn't keen on him for the job of Chief, but gives him a chance to prove himself by asking him to solve the murder of his uncle Archie Baxter, a journalist who was found dead in 1967. Shawn, Gus, Juliet, Henry and Woody all join the case. Lassiter learns that if he accepts the position of SBPD Chief, he cannot have Juliet as his head detective, a job that Vick has offered her. At Juliet's encouragement, Lassiter takes the job as Chief, leaving Juliet to take the job with Chief Vick. The episode ends without clarifying how these changes will affect Shawn's relationship with Juliet.
| 118 | 7 | "Shawn and Gus Truck Things Up" | David Crabtree | Saladin K. Patterson | March 5, 2014 | 1.56 |
Shawn and Gus arrive at the scene of a murder (at Chief Lassiter's request) only to find that the victim is the driver of their favorite food truck. They instantly set out to investigate. Their investigation is complicated by Henry selling the house Shawn grew up in to Lassiter's family and by having to look after Marlowe, who is in her last stages of pregnancy. Right as they are about to nab the culprit, Marlowe goes into labor and winds up delivering the baby in the back of the food truck with Henry serving as "midwife." This episode is further complicated by Shawn's attempts to retrieve his stuff from home only to have Gus take the stuff away claiming it belongs to him.
| 119 | 8 | "A Touch of Sweevil" | Richard Coleman | Kell Cahoon & Todd Harthan | March 12, 2014 | 1.36 |
Shawn and Gus are invited to a convention for paranormal crime solvers. There they meet a woman (Yvette Nicole Brown) who claims to be a witch and a man (Tom Arnold) who claims to communicate with a ghost. When the man who spearheaded the convention is murdered, the consultants must set aside their differences to work together to solve the murder. In the meantime, Chief Lassiter asks Shawn and Gus to kick their tomfoolery up to an 11 in an effort to scare off his unwanted new head detective (Mira Sorvino) and get Juliet the position. Their efforts to do so backfire, however, and in the end, Lassiter is forced to acknowledge that he has more in common with his head detective than he originally thought.
| 120 | 9 | "A Nightmare on State Street" | James Roday | Carlos Jacott | March 19, 2014 | 1.53 |
Selected by Psych fans from an online poll with the original title "Dream Therapy," Shawn and Gus are on the verge of solving a case for Lassiter. While Shawn shops for refreshments, Gus falls into a deep sleep. His sleep is interspersed with memories of visiting a dream therapist (Bruce Campbell) about nightmares he had relating to events of the case. Gus, recently dumped by a girl, is afraid of the recent changes in his life and that Shawn will abandon him. Gus wakes up to find Shawn returning with the refreshments. When they go to report their investigative results to Chief Lassiter, they find that they have been upstaged by Lassiter's new head detective.
| 121 | 10 | "The Break-Up" | Steve Franks | Steve Franks | March 26, 2014 | 1.93 |
In a video log, Shawn details not only his final case of the series, but also his decision to move to San Francisco to be with Juliet, one that he doesn't know how to divulge to Gus. This final case involves a man (Billy Zane) suspected of murdering his business partner, which initially proves difficult to solve since Brannigan (Mira Sorvino) is outpacing Shawn at every turn. The case is solved with an assist from Henry, who has become a criminology professor. In the end, Gus, Woody, Henry, Lassiter, and the previously unseen Dobson (Val Kilmer) all receive a DVD featuring Shawn saying goodbye. Buzz McNab is made junior detective and becomes Brannigan's partner. Henry decides to take over the Psych office. Lassiter decides to break his DVD before Shawn confesses that he is not psychic. Shawn tracks Juliet to a crime scene in San Francisco where he also reunites with Vick, and Gus has also followed him there after stealing their old high school's driver's ed car. Shawn and Gus agree to move the Psych office to San Francisco, though Vick tells him that they already have a consultant who is busy "alphabetizing the pantry" (a deliberate reference to Adrian Monk). Shawn proposes to Juliet, but after she accepts, his grandmother's ring is stolen, and the episode and series ends with Shawn, Gus, and Juliet chasing the thief in the driver's ed car. Note: This episode serves as the series finale; however, Psych: The Movie, which was released on USA Network in December 2017, picked up plot threads from the series finale in real time. The first movie was followed nearly three years later by a sequel, which also picked up from the first movie in real time.

== DVD release ==
Psych: The Complete Eighth Season, consisting of ten episodes, was released on April 1, 2014. The three-disc set includes deleted scenes, episode podcasts, montages, featurettes and a gag reel. The seventh season television special "Psych: The Musical" is also included.
