= The Andy Dick Show =

American sketch comedy series (2001–2002)

- Genre: Sketch comedy
- Created by: Andy Dick
- Directed by: Andy Dick; Steve Priola
- Starring: Andy Dick
- Theme music composer: Guy Erez, Andy Dick
- Country of origin: United States
- Original language: English
- No. of seasons: 3
- No. of episodes: 21 (+1 unaired pilot filmed in 2000)

Production
- Executive producers: Jim Biederman; Andy Dick; Senior Producer/Head Writer Scott Tomlinson
- Producers: CK Gillen; Jonathan Green; Gabe Miller; Andee Kuroda; R.P. Sekon; Brigid Walsh
- Camera setup: Single-camera
- Running time: 22–24 minutes

Original release
- Network: MTV
- Release: February 27, 2001 – May 18, 2002

The Andy Dick Show is an American sketch comedy series that aired on MTV from February 2001 to May 2002. The series was created and written by comedian Andy Dick, also the main protagonist of the show.

== Content ==
Every episode of the series was written and directed by Andy Dick. Generally, he would appear as different characters in several mockumentary sketches, with that character appearing as a talking head narrating events shown in Cinéma vérité and b-roll.

His most recognizable and frequent character was Daphne Aguilera, a rude pop star clearly modeled after the exploits and vices of Christina Aguilera, Britney Spears and other pop icons. Daphne, according to "herself", is Christina Aguilera's cousin; in "her" words, "my mother is her mother's cousin's friend... or they live on the same block. So, [Christina and I are] basically cousins". The Daphne character was heavily promoted by the real MTV in the weeks leading up to the premiere of The Andy Dick Show. The show's first episode featured the mock-single "Naughty Baby Did a No-No", a take on Britney Spears' single "Oops!... I Did It Again."

Daphne would later appear in other segments, appearing on MTV's Cribs and a parody of The View. Daphne even managed to perform "Naughty Baby Did a No-No" at the 2001 MTV Video Music Awards, but cancelled her own performance in the beginning, and then tried (in jest) to attack Christina Aguilera, who was laughing all the time. After The Andy Dick Show's cancellation, Daphne made two appearances on MADtv.

Several sketches featured Dick as Tom Green. This led to a guest appearance by Green in which each actor played the other.

Dick was also fond of playing Marilyn Manson, whom he has satirized in several sketches. In a 2001 interview on Late Night with Conan O'Brien, Dick said that Manson actually invited him to his home, and after watching a sketch called "Marilyn Poppins", Manson said it was the funniest thing he had ever seen.

Many celebrities appeared on the show, including some of Dick's former co-stars such as Ben Stiller, Janeane Garofalo, Dave Foley, Bob Odenkirk, Maura Tierney, Stephen Root, and others such as Dave Grohl, Moby, Christian Slater, Nikka Costa, Rob Zombie, Sevendust, Drew Pinsky, Dr. Joyce Brothers, Da Brat, Vitamin C, Ashton Kutcher and Edward Furlong.

In 2022, Dick shot The New Andy Dick Show.

== Reception ==
The program was described in SPIN as "a morbidly funny sketch program that features everything from abusive fathers to talking anuses."
