= 100 Clues =

- Psych episode
- Title card
- Episode no.: Season 7 Episode 5
- Directed by: Matt Shakman
- Written by: Todd Harthan
- Original air date: March 27, 2013

Guest appearances
- Christopher Lloyd as Martin Kahn; Lesley Ann Warren as Leslie; Curt Smith as himself; Garrett Morris as Clizby; Steve Valentine as Billy Lips; Martin Mull as Highway Harry

Episode chronology
← Previous "No Country for Two Old Men"	Next → "Cirque du Soul"
- Psych season 7

100 Clues is the fifth episode of season seven and the one-hundredth episode overall of the American detective-comedy series Psych.

== Plot synopsis ==
In 2007, Shawn Spencer (James Roday) and Burton Guster (Dule Hill) went backstage after a Billy Lipps & The Guys Behind Me concert to investigate a cold case involving the lead singer, Billy Lipps, and a woman named Melinda Lane who was suffocated with a pillow at his mansion. Carlton Lassiter appeared soon after them, arresting Lipps as a suspect in the case due to new incriminating information revealed in his biography.

In the present, Shawn gets invited to an exclusive party with an anonymous host via a singing telegram at the Psych office. Shawn, who is told he can bring a "plus-one" offers the spot to Juliet O'Hara, but due to a missing persons case she's investigating keeping her busy, he brings Gus instead. Later that night, the two arrive at the mansion along with the other guests. The host reveals himself as Billy Lipps, who was freed after a five-year sentence for the manslaughter of Melinda Lane. The people at the party, Shawn deduces, were all parts of Lipps's life before the arrest, including the band's butler (Garrett Morris), the band's manager Highway Harry (Martin Mull), the author of the biography (Christopher Lloyd), and the band's nurse (Lesley Ann Warren).

Suddenly, the power goes out due to a thunder strike. When the lights come back on, it's discovered that Highway Harry is dead. The attendants believe he died from natural causes, but Shawn believes the death was caused by Rip, the band's guitar player, who is suspiciously missing from the party. Shawn believes he's hiding in the house, causing the group to split up and find him. Carlton Lassiter and Juliet O'Hara appear at the mansion because the missing person they were investigating, now discovered murdered, had a GPS navigating to the mansion. The two detectives discover Gus and Shawn's investigation, which now has taken a turn with the reveal that Highway Harry's body has gone missing and the discovery of Rip's body. Rip, who is discovered to be Juliet and Carlton's missing person, dying causes the two cops to interrogate each attendee. The interrogations, however, don't help the investigation.

A new guest then arrives to the party, Curt Smith of Tears for Fears with a gunshot wound. He passes out before being able to reveal who shot him. Shawn then theorizes that the killer is Leslie, who supposedly had a child with one of the male guests years ago who then abandoned the family and Leslie is taking revenge on the possible fathers. Leslie proves this to be untrue, as she knows the father is Clizby. Highway Harry then enters, alive, as he was merely unconscious the whole time. Juliet then presents the theory that everyone had a hand in the murder, Shawn tests that theory, and comes up wrong. But there are three suspects he believes did the murder.

In the first ending, it's revealed Clizby committed the murder, motive being that the band stole his songs, so he pinned a murder on Lipps and killed Rip when he discovered the con. Curt Smith was shot by Clizby when he saw him dispose of the murder weapon.

The second ending reveals the killer to be Martin Kahn, the biographer. His motive was his love for Melinda Lane, who only loved the members of the band, so Kahn killed her. He then added false information into the biography to point the blame at Lipps, and when Rip discovered this, he was killed as well. Curt Smith was shot by Kahn when he discovered him dispose of the murder weapon.

The third ending makes Highway Harry the killer. He killed Melinda Lane because he was in love with her, but she only loved Lipps. Years later, Rip realized Highway Harry had killed her, so after a confrontation, Rip was murdered by Harry. Curt Smith saw Harry dispose of the weapon, causing Smith to be shot.

No matter the ending, the episode ends with the killer being arrested and Curt Smith being loaded into an ambulance, though he is abandoned on a stretcher to be attacked by Lipps's pet panther, Emma.

== Production ==
The episode was created in celebration of the one-hundredth overall episode of Psych and is a direct homage to the 1985 film Clue. The cast includes three actors from the original film, these being Christopher Lloyd, Martin Mull, and Leslie Ann Warren. As a part of the homage, the remaining actors mirror the other roles from the film, like the traditional butler role popularized by Tim Curry.

As the episode aired, viewers on Twitter and the Psych website could vote on the outcome of the episode. Both the East and West coasts voted live, with a tally of the votes displaying during the episode. The third unaired outcome was released on the season's DVD set, while the two outcomes were released on VOD on either coast after the original airing.

== Reception ==
The episode drew 2.93 million viewers according to the Nielsen Ratings system.

Kevin McFarland writing for The A.V. Club rated the episode a "B" and writes "'100 Clues' isn’t an extravaganza, or a treatise on the series at this particular milestone. It’s an entertaining tribute to a film that shares a lot of tonal similarities to Psych, and like many episodes before, it relies on the strength of its eccentricities and character interaction to outweigh a thin mystery plot.".
