= The Assistant (TV series) =

- Genre: Reality comedy
- Directed by: Kasey Barrett; Jeff Fisher (film director)
- Presented by: Andy Dick
- Country of origin: United States
- Original language: English
- No. of seasons: 1
- No. of episodes: 8

Production
- Running time: 25 minutes

Original release
- Network: MTV
- Release: 12 July – 30 August 2004

The Assistant is a reality television series that parodies other reality shows such as The Apprentice, The Bachelor, The Bachelorette, Survivor, American Idol, and Fear Factor. Its eight episodes originally aired on MTV. It features comedian Andy Dick's search for a new personal assistant. The beginning of the first episode parodied The Bachelor, with the twelve contestants arriving in limousines, and Dick waiting outside to greet them with his maid and butler. A "rose ceremony" immediately followed, and one contestant was eliminated.

Dick assigns the Hollywood hopefuls to absurd tasks such as pretending to be him in an interview with a Japanese television station, bringing him coffee by traversing on a beam over a swimming pool, breaking up with his girlfriend, and attempting to get him a star on the Hollywood Walk of Fame.

Contestants are usually "clipped" in elimination ceremonies parodying those on other reality series. Like some other programs, The Assistant also includes double elimination episodes and brings back fired candidates. Driving home Dick's message that they were starting from the bottom, candidates sleep in Dick's garage. He also wakes them with a flashing, siren-generating alarm, is prone to tantrums, and gripes that, "This reality show is ruining my life!"

Andy Dick actually had a relationship with one of the contestants on the show. Andy and Sarah Beckworth dated after the show's end. The end of the relationship led to a breach of contract lawsuit with MTV which prohibited relationships with the contestants.

Though the show was satire, the twelve contestants were real and the winner, Melissa Ordway, was awarded several prizes including a job at MTV. The runner-up was Mark, who had been fired, but was brought back in the seventh episode. The show was not renewed.

== Contestants eliminated and reality show parodied ==
(in reverse order of elimination)

- Melissa Ordway (winner)
- Mark Rogers
  - The Apprentice theme, eliminated episode 4 (brought back 7)
  - Eliminated episode 8
- Tanika Kennedy
  - Fear Factor theme, eliminated episode 7
- Mykell Wilson
  - American Idol theme, eliminated episode 6
- Colin Blake
  - American Idol theme, eliminated episode 6
- Anna Enger
  - Unaware, surprise lie detector test, eliminated episode 5
- Stefani Fischer
  - The Amazing Race theme, eliminated episode 5
- Ebony Costain
  - Survivor theme, eliminated episode 3
- Nikeda Stanback
  - Who Wants to Be a Millionaire? theme, eliminated episode 1 (brought back episode 3)
  - Survivor theme, eliminated episode 3
- Sarah Beckworth
  - America's Next Top Model theme, eliminated episode 2
- Jeff Jimenez
  - America's Next Top Model theme, eliminated episode 2
- Andrew Sturgis (Andrew Rodgman)
  - The Bachelor theme, eliminated episode 1
