= Gravy (film) =

- Promotional film poster
- Directed by: James Roday Rodriguez
- Written by: James Roday Rodriguez; Todd Harthan
- Produced by: Craig Chapman; Kerry Rock
- Starring: Michael Weston; Jimmi Simpson; Sutton Foster; Lily Cole; Gabourey Sidibe; Sarah Silverman
- Cinematography: Amanda Treyz
- Edited by: Abe Levy
- Music by: Charlton Pettus; Curt Smith
- Production companies: Siren Digital; TapouT Films
- Distributed by: Shout! Factory; Scream Factory
- Release date: October 2, 2015 (United States)
- Running time: 95 minutes
- Country: United States
- Language: English

Gravy is a 2015 American comedy horror film directed by James Roday Rodriguez in his feature directorial debut and written by Roday and Todd Harthan. It stars Michael Weston, Jimmi Simpson, Sutton Foster, Lily Cole, Gabourey Sidibe, and Sarah Silverman. The film was released in the United States on October 2, 2015, by Scream Factory.

== Plot ==
It's All Hallow's Eve. Anson enters a convenience store where he buys sorbet and flirts with the cashier, Bethany. Nearby the employees of a Mexican Cantina & Bar, waitress Cricket, bartender Kerry, cook Yannick, busboy Hector, manager Chuy, and security guard Winketta close up the Cantina and have a small party celebrating Kerry, who is leaving to become a paramedic. As the party wraps up the employees discover the doors have been welded shut and the phone lines are cut. Anson, his brother Stef, and Stef's girlfriend Mimi (the latter two having been at a table making out earlier) then appear and quickly take the employees hostage, tying them to chairs. Apparently uninterested in money, their true intentions soon become clear - they are sadists and cannibals, who plan to torture and eat the various employees.

Stef soon chains up Yannick in the kitchen to cook the various employees as they are dispatched in different sick and sadistic games. After the trio eat Chuy, Kerry pretends to be romantically interested in Anson to gain his trust, and comes onto him while retrieving a list of items from the pantry for Yannick to cook with.

However while eating Winketta's corpse Stef starts to experience anaphylactic shock, and realizes Yannick has snuck basil into his food, which he had forbid earlier as he is highly allergic. Examining the list of items he realizes that Yannick used the Army of Portugal cipher to tell Kerry to bring him basil. While Stef and Yannick start fighting each other, in the other room Hector has managed to free himself and Cricket. Anson and Hector square off upstairs while Cricket and Kerry fight Mimi. Back in the kitchen, after a long battle with both parties sustaining horrible wounds, Stef manages to kill Yannick. Mimi kills Cricket, but Kerry manages to kill her, and just as it appears Hector will kill Anson, Anson kills Hector instead.

Anson and Kerry reunite and head into the kitchen, where Anson sees his brothers condition and learns from Stef that Kerry betrayed him and brought Yannick the basil (Which Kerry confirms, and further tells him her apparent romantic interest in him was a ruse). While Anson holds his brother as he succumbs to his wounds and anaphylaxis, Kerry frees Burt, a random patron who was being kept hostage in the kitchen by Mimi. Together they head upstairs to escape through an opening for an air conditioner. When Anson suddenly runs out of the kitchen attempts to attack Kerry after Stef dies, she manages to shoot him with arrow. Thinking she is safe Kerry crawls out the opening, only for a revived Anson to appear & take a bite out of her leg; however Kerry still manages to escape. Though the fall from the opening kills Burt, Kerry lives and is riding away on a Vespa when she is hit by an ambulance, whose driver happens to be someone she completed paramedic training with. As she is loaded into the ambulance, Kerry panics and notes that Anson (who had been watching from the opening) has disappeared.

Several months later, we see Anson consulting with his brother (who is now a pickled head impaled on a stick) before heading into the convenience store he went to in the beginning of the movie. He visits with Bethany (the clerk) and gives her a single red rose while proposing a romance between them, which Bethany agrees to. As Bethany and Anson share ice cream & flirt, the camera pulls back to reveal Kerry across the street, scarred but alive, taking photos of them. She smiles slyly into the camera before the screen cuts to black.

== Cast ==
- Michael Weston as Anson
- Jimmi Simpson as Stef
- Sutton Foster as Kerry
- Lily Cole as Mimi
- Molly Ephraim as Cricket
- Paul Rodriguez as Chuy
- Lothaire Bluteau as Yannick
- Ethan Sandler as Burt
- Gabriel Luna as Hector
- Gabourey Sidibe as Winketta
- Sarah Silverman as Bethany
- Kate Rogal as Jez

Director James Roday Rodriguez and his Psych co-star Dulé Hill cameo as paramedics Marty and Delroy.

== Production ==
Filming took place in March 2013 in Los Angeles, California, with a cast including Sarah Silverman, Michael Weston, Jimmi Simpson, Sutton Foster, Lily Cole, Gabourey Sidibe, Paul Rodriguez, Molly Ephraim, Lothaire Bluteau, Gabriel Luna, and Ethan Sandler.

On April 5, 2013, after the film had already wrapped, it was officially reported that James Roday Rodriguez was making his film directorial debut with Gravy.

== Release ==
The distribution rights were acquired by Shout! Factory under its subsidiary Scream Factory on June 22, 2015. The film was released in a limited release on October 2, 2015, before being released on video on demand, and DVD and Blu-ray on October 6, 2015.

== See also ==
- List of films set around Halloween
