= Lori Cardille =

American actress

- Born: 1953 or 1954 (age 72–73)
- Occupation: Actress
- Years active: 1978–present
- Children: Kate Rogal
- Father: Bill Cardille

Lori Cardille (born 1953 or 1954) is an American actress, best known for her role in Day of the Dead (1985).

== Career ==
Cardille's notable television roles were the first Winter Austen (1978–1979) on the ABC soap opera The Edge of Night, and Carol Baker on soap opera Ryan's Hope. Her most notable film role is Sarah in George A. Romero's Day of the Dead (1985).

=== Writing ===
She is the author of the book I'm Gonna Tell: ...an Offbeat Tale of Survival, which chronicles her journey after surviving sexual abuse.

== Personal life ==
Cardille is the daughter of Pittsburgh TV personality Bill Cardille, who played himself in George A. Romero's Night of the Living Dead (1968), and Louise Maras. She studied acting at Carnegie Mellon University.

Cardille's daughter is actress Kate Rogal.

== Filmography ==
=== Film ===
Year	Title	Role	Notes
1985	Day of the Dead	Sarah Bowman	
1993	Zombie Jamboree: The 25th Anniversary of Night of the Living Dead	Self	Documentary
1994	No Pets	Lorraine Turner	
2008	Dead On: The Life and Cinema of George A. Romero	Self	Documentary
2019	In Search of Darkness	Self	Documentary
2020	In Search of Darkness: Part II	Self	Documentary
2023	Night of the Living Dead 2	Mandy	
2023	The TRIP	Carol Burch	
2025	Mercy	Director Holden	

=== Television ===
Year	Title	Role	Notes
1975	Ryan's Hope	Carol Baker	
1978–1979	The Edge of Night	Winter Austen #1	
1982	Parole	Suzanne Driscoll	Television film
1985	The Equalizer	Sarah Claxton	Episode: "The Distant Fire"
1986	Tales from the Darkside	Emily McCall	Episode: "Florence Bravo"
1989	The Incredibly Strange Film Show	Self	Episode: "George A. Romero & Tom Savini"
1991	Dead and Alive: The Race for Gus Farace	Female Agent	Television film
2016	Doomsday	Detective Dara Dormand	Episode: "Little Leaks Sink the Ship: Part II"
2019	Stranger Things	Sarah	Archival footage; Episode: "Chapter One: Suzie, Do You Copy?"
