= Danny Roane: First Time Director =

- Theatrical release poster
- Directed by: Andy Dick
- Written by: Andy Dick
- Produced by: Marshall Cook; Chris Romano
- Starring: Andy Dick; Frankie Muniz; Jack Black; Sara Rue; Mo Collins; Ben Stiller; James Van Der Beek; Anthony Rapp; Maura Tierney
- Cinematography: Ben Gamble
- Edited by: John M. Valerio
- Music by: Paul Henderson; Jason Miller
- Distributed by: Lions Gate Entertainment
- Release date: March 11, 2006 (SXSW)
- Running time: 83 minutes
- Country: United States
- Language: English

Danny Roane: First Time Director is a 2006 American mockumentary comedy film written, directed by and starring Andy Dick, and also starring Jack Black and Mo Collins. This independent production is a documentary mixed with a mockumentary on Dick's struggle on making a film. The film premiered at the 2006 South by Southwest Film Festival, and released to DVD on November 6, 2007.

== Plot ==
After being blackballed from Hollywood because of his drunken antics, Danny Roane, a washed up TV actor, sobers up to direct his first feature film. As the pressure builds, Roane turns to the bottle again and attempts to finish his movie about drug and alcohol abuse. But in his drunken madness, he decides to make the film a musical.

== Cast ==
- Andy Dick as Danny Roane
- Frankie Muniz as Himself
- Jack Black as Himself
- Sara Rue as Charlotte Lewis
- Mo Collins as Deidra Fennigan
- Ben Stiller as Himself
- James Van Der Beek as Himself
- Anthony Rapp as Himself
- Maura Tierney as Herself
- Danny Trejo as Hector
