= Kate Rogal =

American actress (born 1983)

- Born: November 2, 1983 (age 42)
- Education: Carnegie Mellon University (BFA)
- Occupation: Actress
- Years active: 1994–present
- Spouse: Dana Ashbrook (m. 2015)
- Mother: Lori Cardille
- Relatives: Bill Cardille (grandfather)

Kate Rogal (born November 2, 1983) is an American actress. Best known for appearing on The Sopranos, Law & Order, Law & Order: Criminal Intent, Law & Order: Special Victims Unit, Psych, and Blue Bloods.

== Early life ==
Rogal is the daughter of actress Lori Cardille who starred in George A. Romero's Day of the Dead (1985). She graduated with a BFA from the Carnegie Mellon School of Drama in 2006, and apprenticed with the United Stuntman's Association.

== Career ==
Rogal has performed mostly in supporting roles. Her most notable roles are Kate Favor on Psych, Jez in Gravy, and Gretchen in Concussion. In theater Rogal starred in the off-Broadway play Muckrakers.

Rogal is an artist, working mostly with beads and other textile mediums.

== Personal life ==
Rogal married actor Dana Ashbrook in 2015.

== Filmography ==
=== Film ===
Year	Title	Role	Notes
1995	Roommates	Papergirl	
2008	The Narrows	Xander	
2010	Date Night	Jade	Uncredited
2011	Coming Up Roses	Prostitute	
2012	Safe	Hooker	
2013	Concussion	Gretchen	
2015	Gravy	Jez	
2016	The End of Mara	Fay	Short
2021	Killer Among Us	Destiny	

=== Television ===
Year	Title	Role	Notes
1994	A Promise Kept: The Oksana Baiul Story	Galya	Television film
2007	The Sopranos	Misha	Episode: "Remember When"
2007	Six Degrees	Bartender	Episode: "Objects in the Mirror"
2007	The Kill Point	Mary Kim	4 episodes
2009	Law & Order: Criminal Intent	Director	Episode: "Salome in Manhattan"
2009	Law & Order	Nina Wilshere	Episode: "Boy Gone Astray"
2009	Crash	Deedee	Episode: "Calm Like a Bomb"
2012	Law & Order: Special Victims Unit	Katrine Kearns	Episode: "Friendly Emily"
2013	Psych	Kate Favor	Episode: "Lassie Jerky"
2014	Royal Pains	Kayla	Episode: "A Bridge Not Quite Far Enough"
2015	Blue Bloods	Valerie Traynor	Episode: "Love Stories"
2015	Forever	Margo	Episode: "Dead Men Tell Long Tales"
