= Ethan Sandler =

American actor

- Occupations: Actor; producer; writer
- Years active: 1988–present
- Spouse: Kathryn Hahn (m. 2002)
- Children: 2

Ethan Sandler is an American actor, film producer and writer known for his role of ADA Jeffrey Brandau on the television series Crossing Jordan.

== Career ==
Sandler's screen credits include The Chocolate War, Flushed, and The Enigma with a Stigma. He can be heard voicing multiple characters in Disney's 2007 animated film Meet the Robinsons. From 2002 to 2007 he was in Crossing Jordan as ADA Jeffrey Brandau.

== Personal life ==
Sandler graduated from Northwestern University, where he met his future wife, actress Kathryn Hahn. They have been married since 2002 and have two children together, Leonard and Mae. They live in Los Feliz, Los Angeles. In his free time, Sandler enjoys gardening and listening to basketball podcasts.

== Filmography ==
=== Film ===
Year	Film	Role	Notes
1988	The Chocolate War	David Caroni	
1992	Adventures in Spying	unknown	
1999	Flushed	unknown	
2001	The Princess Diaries	Tour Bus Driver	
2004	The Bourne Supremacy	Kurt	
2006	The Enigma with a Stigma	Ernie Reynolds	
2007	Meet the Robinsons	DOR-15 (Doris), Uncle Fritz, Aunt Petunia, Uncle Dimitri, Uncle Spike, Cousin Laszlo, CEO of InventCo	Voice
2015	Gravy	Bert	

=== Television ===
Year	Film	Role	Notes
1990	She'll Take Romance	Eddie	TV movie
2000	Sex and the City	Dennis Fincher	1 episode
2000	The $treet	Brad Green	1 episode
2002	Will & Grace	Doctor	1 episode
2002–2007	Crossing Jordan	ADA Jeffrey Brandau	15 episodes
2003	A Carol Christmas	Jerry	TV movie
2013	Psych	Mike	Episode: "Juliet takes a luvvah"
2014–2016	Transparent	Barry	Recurring role
2016	New Girl	Juror 9C	Episode: "Goosebumps Walkaway"
2018	Love	Tom	Episode: "Bertie's Birthday"
2021–2023	HouseBroken	Writer	2 episodes
2021–2024	Monsters at Work	Creative consultant Writer	Episodes: "Adorable Returns" (co-written with Bobs Gannaway), "Field of Screams"
2025	Monster: The Ed Gein Story	Robert Bloch	2 episodes

=== Producer ===
Year	Film	Notes
2010	My Boys	Producer/writer
2011–2012	Whitney	Consulting producer/writer
2013	We Are Men	Co-executive producer
2016–2017	New Girl	Co-executive producer/writer
2017–2020	Man with a Plan	Co-executive producer/writer
