= Anthony Rapp =

American actor (born 1971)

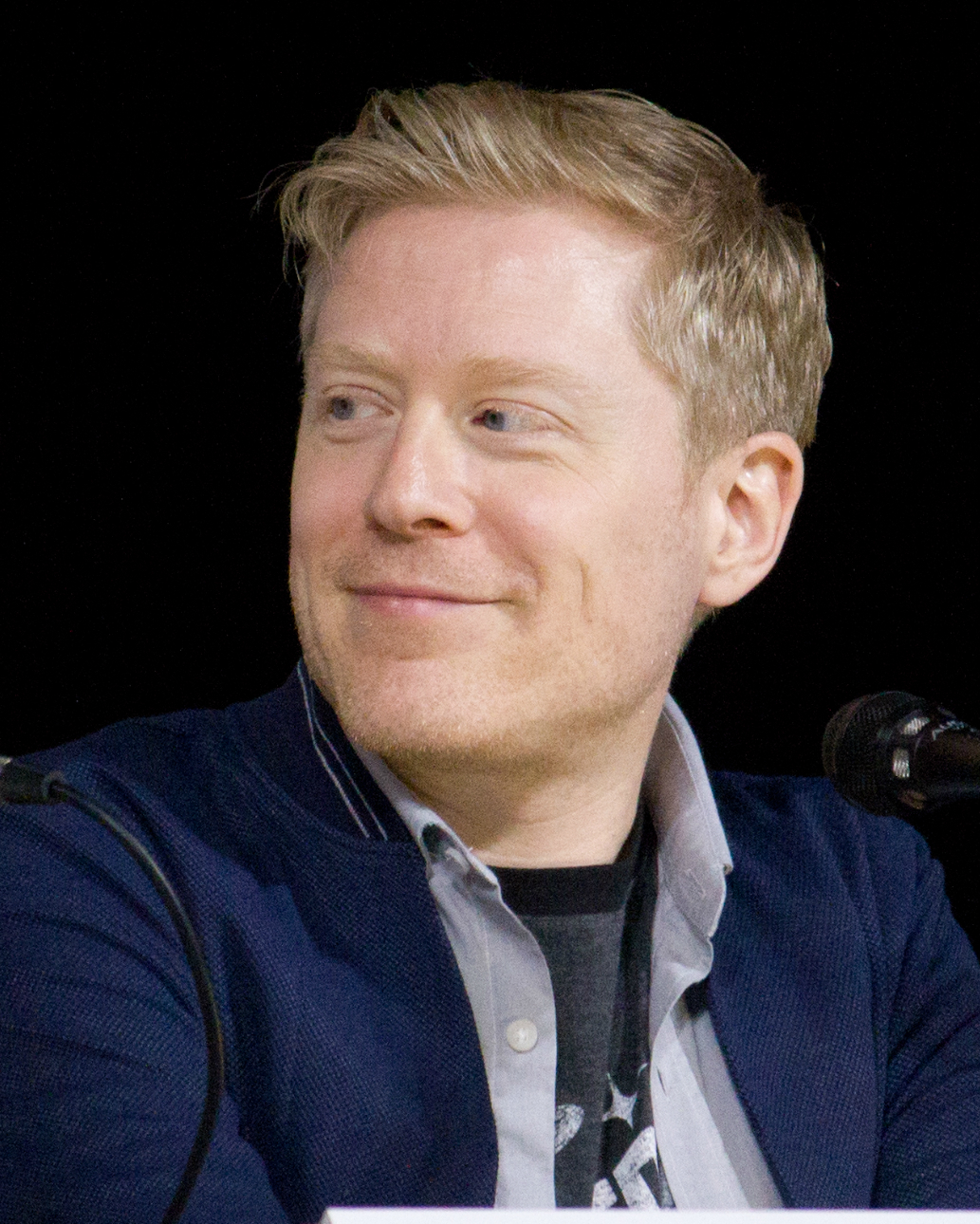
- Rapp in 2017
- Born: Anthony Deane Rapp; October 26, 1971 (age 55); Chicago, Illinois, U.S.
- Occupations: Actor; singer
- Years active: 1981–present
- Partner(s): Ken Ithiphol (2016–present; engaged)
- Children: 2
- Relatives: Adam Rapp (brother)

Anthony Deane Rapp (born October 26, 1971) is an American actor and singer who originated the role of Mark Cohen in the Broadway production of Rent. Following his original performance of the role in 1996, he reprised it in the film version of the show and the show's United States tour in 2009. He also performed Charlie Brown in the 1999 Broadway revival of You're a Good Man, Charlie Brown and originated the role of Lucas in the musical If/Then in 2014. From 2017 to 2024, he played Commander Paul Stamets on the television series Star Trek: Discovery.

Rapp is also known for accusing actor Kevin Spacey of sexual misconduct in 2017 during the #MeToo movement over an alleged event from 1986. The same allegation generated an unsuccessful civil case in 2022 where a jury found Spacey not liable.

== Early life ==
Rapp was born on October 26, 1971, in Chicago, Illinois to Mary Lee (née Baird) and Douglas Rapp and raised in nearby Joliet. After his parents' divorce in 1974, he was raised by his mother, a nurse. His older brother is playwright, novelist and filmmaker Adam Rapp. He also has an older sister.

Rapp participated in community theater as a child and won awards for his singing in junior high school. He attended Joliet West High School and theatre camp at Interlochen Arts Camp in Michigan. He moved to New York in 1989 to attend New York University as a film student, but dropped out after a semester.

== Career ==
Rapp first performed on Broadway in 1981 in The Little Prince and the Aviator, a musical based on Antoine de Saint-Exupéry's novel The Little Prince. It closed during previews. He made his screen debut in the ensemble of the 1987 film Adventures in Babysitting, directed by Chris Columbus, who later directed Rapp in the film version of Rent. Rapp has appeared in several movies and Broadway shows. His notable roles include such films as Dazed and Confused, A Beautiful Mind, School Ties, Road Trip, Six Degrees of Separation (stage and film versions), The Beach Boys: An American Family, and Danny Roane: First Time Director.

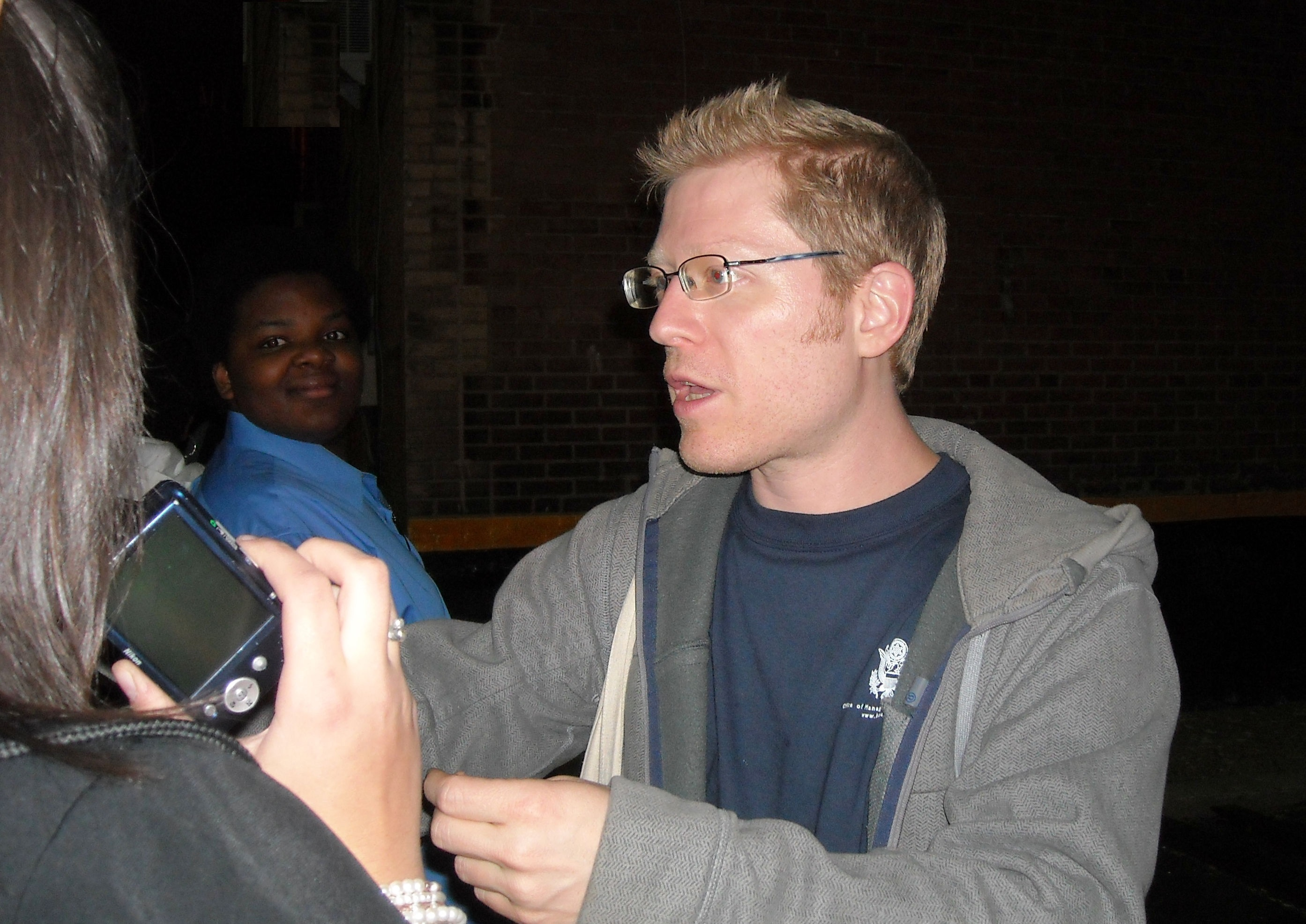
Rapp greeting fans following a 2009 performance of Rent

Rapp played Mark Cohen in the off-Broadway and original Broadway casts of Jonathan Larson's musical Rent. For his audition, he sang R.E.M.'s "Losing My Religion", and received his callback in September 1994. After offering him the role, Jonathan Larson wrote new songs for the production with Rapp's voice in mind. Rapp reprised the role in the film adaptation, released on November 23, 2005. He returned to the stage version with original cast member Adam Pascal, from July 30 to October 7, 2007. Rapp, Pascal and fellow original cast member Gwen Stewart also participated in a national tour of Rent beginning January 6, 2009.

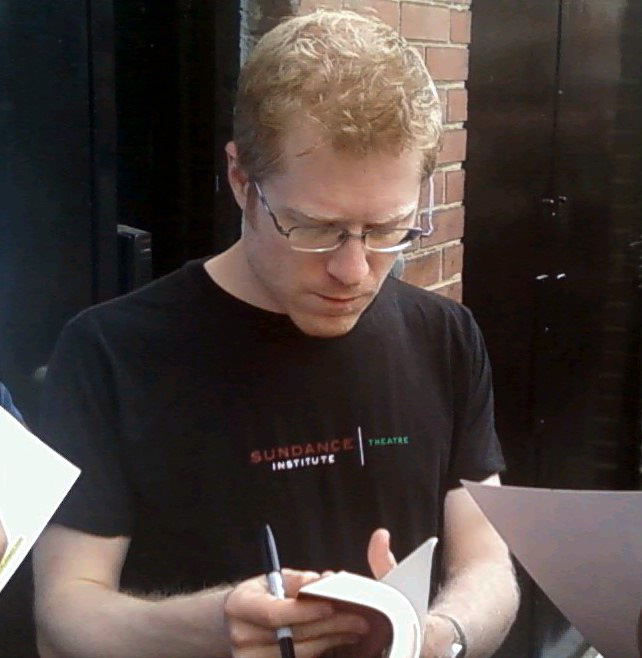
Rapp in 2009 at the Fox Theatre in St. Louis

Rapp released a solo CD, Look Around, in 2000. In 2006, he published a memoir about Rent and his relationship with his mother, Without You: A Memoir of Love, Loss, and the Musical Rent, which he spent six years writing. Rapp developed a one-man stage show with music based on the memoir beginning in 2007, later performing it at such locations as the Edinburgh Festival Fringe. A recording of the show was released on December 11, 2012, by PS Classics.

In 2005, Rapp played The Doctor in the world premiere of Feeling Electric (later the Broadway musical Next to Normal) at the New York Musical Theatre Festival. During Next to Normal's Off-Broadway run in 2008, he worked as assistant director to Michael Greif, who had directed him in Rent, and wrote the introduction to the published script.

Rapp played Lucas in If/Then, starring fellow Rent alum Idina Menzel. It opened at the National Theatre in Washington, D.C., began previews on Broadway on March 5, 2014, and opened on Broadway at the Richard Rodgers Theater on March 30. In July, Rapp had to miss performances due to a knee injury and surgery. It closed on March 22, 2015. Rapp reprised the role in the 2015-2016 National Tour with Menzel and the rest of the main Broadway cast.

Rapp also appeared in "Psych: The Musical", an episode of the TV series Psych, which premiered on USA Network on December 15, 2013. In 2016, Rapp was cast in Star Trek: Discovery as Lt. Commander Paul Stamets, the first openly gay character in the Star Trek television series. It was Rapp's first television regular role; while he had watched some Star Trek as a child, he watched "curated lists" of episodes from the multiple series to prepare for the role.

== Personal life ==
Rapp had a close relationship with his mother, who was battling cancer during the beginning of the off-Broadway and Broadway transfer of Rent. He visited her on weekends. She died at age 55 in 1997. He credits her for instilling values of justice and respect in him.

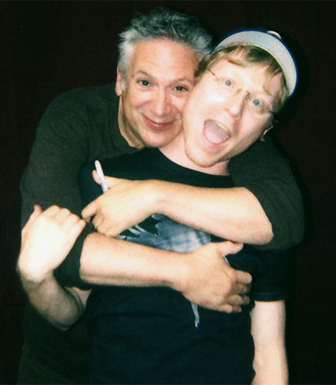
Rapp (right) with Harvey Fierstein at the Annual Flea Market and Grand Auction hosted by Broadway Cares/Equity Fights AIDS in September 2006

In a 1997 Advocate interview, Rapp described himself as bisexual and recounts how he came out to his mother at 18, telling her that he had a boyfriend. Although originally upset, by her death she had grown comfortable with it. In an interview with Oasis magazine from the same year, he explained why he labelled his sexuality as queer rather than gay:

The things [sic] that's been most important to me to be out about is that I have been in loving relationships with men [...] I haven't said 'I am gay.' Because the truth is that I've also been in love with women, although the truth is I do think I'm primarily homosexual. But the whole debate about bisexuality gets tiresome to me and I don't want to enter into it. People have such misconceptions about it. I'm really happy that right now there's a great conversation going on about fluidity, because I think that for a lot of people, that's the case. [...] I label myself as queer because I think if I have to have any label, that encompasses lesbian, gay, bisexual, everyone.

He has also identified as "four-and-a-half" on the Kinsey scale. Despite this, in 2012, Metro Weekly referred to Rapp as "one of the first openly gay men on Broadway". He has cited working with Larry Kramer as a young man (in Kramer's play The Destiny of Me) for his commitment to activism and "liv[ing] an open life".

Rapp is a "die hard" Chicago Cubs fan and co-hosts the baseball podcast The Clubhouse. At the Cubs game on August 29, 2016, he threw the first pitch and sang the Star Spangled Banner. He enjoys playing poker and video games.

In November 2019, Rapp announced his engagement to his partner, Ken Ithiphol. They have two children, both born via surrogacy.

=== Accusations against Kevin Spacey ===
In October 2017, Rapp alleged in an interview with BuzzFeed that actor Kevin Spacey made an unwanted sexual advance toward him in 1986, when Rapp was 14 and Spacey was 26. At the time, Rapp and Spacey were both appearing in Broadway shows – Rapp in Precious Sons, Spacey in Long Day's Journey into Night – and Spacey invited Rapp to a party at his home. Rapp said that at the end of the evening, an apparently drunk Spacey "picked [him] up like a groom picks up the bride over the threshold", placed him on the bed, and held him down while tightening his grip on him. "He was trying to seduce me", Rapp said. "I don't know if I would have used that language. But I was aware that he was trying to get with me sexually." Rapp added that he met with a lawyer to discuss possible legal action, but was told there was no case worth pursuing. He had previously discussed the incident in a 2001 interview with The Advocate, but Spacey's name was redacted from publication to avoid legal disputes and public outing. Rapp claimed he was inspired to come forward in 2017 after the effects of the Harvey Weinstein sexual abuse allegations with the support of his family, boyfriend, and representatives; however, text message evidence shown during Rapp's trial against Spacey showed that Rapp had reported his allegation about Spacey to BuzzFeed before Lupita Nyong'o, whom Rapp previously credited for inspiring him to come forward.

In response, Spacey posted on Twitter that he did not remember the encounter but said that he was "beyond horrified to hear his story", and offered Rapp the "sincerest apology for what would have been deeply inappropriate drunken behavior". After the BuzzFeed article, at least 14 other people came forward to accuse Spacey of sexual misconduct, ultimately leading to him losing his starring role on House of Cards and involvement in other projects. Rapp faced harassment and criticism for the accusation. On September 9, 2020, he sued Spacey for sexual assault, sexual battery, and intentional infliction of emotional distress under the Child Victims Act, which extended New York's statute of limitations for civil suits related to child sexual abuse. Rapp sought $40 million in damages. Joining Rapp in the suit against Spacey was a man who requested to remain anonymous who accused Spacey of sexually abusing him in 1983, when he was 14 and Spacey was 23. On October 20, 2022, a jury found Spacey not liable.

== Filmography ==
=== Film ===
Year	Title	Role	Notes
1987	Adventures in Babysitting	Daryl Coopersmith	
1989	Grave Secrets	Jamie	
1989	Far from Home	Pinky Sears	
1992	School Ties	Richard "McGoo" Collins	
1993	Dazed and Confused	Tony Olson	
1993	Six Degrees of Separation	Ben	
1996	Twister	Tony	
1996	The Mantis Murder	Unknown	
1997	David Searching	David	
1999	Man of the Century	Timothy Burns	
2000	Road Trip	Jacob Schultz	
2001	Cruise Control	Mirror Man	Short
2001	A Beautiful Mind	Bender	
2002	Paradisco	L'ami américain	Short
2004	Open House	Barry Farnsworth	
2005	Rent	Mark Cohen	
2005	Winter Passing	Dean	
2006	Danny Roane: First Time Director	Self	
2007	Let Them Chirp Awhile	Self	
2007	Blackbird	Unknown	
2008	Scaring the Fish	Gene	
2009	The Other Woman	Simon	
2012	Junction	Connor	
2014	Grind	Vincent	Short
2015	Not Again	Dr. Thom	Short
2016	Opening Night	Logan Joyce	
2016	Do You Take This Man	Daniel	
2016	bwoy	Brad	
2022	Scrap	Ben	

=== Television ===
Year	Title	Role	Notes
1990	Sky High	Wes Hansen	TV movie
1994	Assault at West Point: The Court-Martial of Johnson Whittaker	Cadet Frederick G. Hodgson	TV movie
1996	The Lazarus Man	Verity	Episode: "Panorama"
1997	Spin City	Himself	Episode: "An Affair to Remember"
1997	The X-Files	Jeff Glaser	Episode: "Detour"
2000	The Beach Boys: An American Family	Van Dyke Parks	TV movie
2004	Law & Order: Special Victims Unit	Matt Spevak	Episode: "Bound"
2006–07	Kidnapped	Larry Kellogg	4 episodes
2012	Law & Order: Special Victims Unit	Nathan Forrester	Episode: "Lessons Learned"
2013	Psych	Zachary Wallace Zander aka Z	Episode: "Psych: The Musical"
2014	It Could Be Worse	Casting Director	Episode: "Uncharted Territory"
2015	Stop the Bleeding	Buster	2 episodes
2015	The Knick	Dr. Thurman Drexler	3 episodes
2017–2018	The Good Fight	Glenn	3 episodes
2017–2024	Star Trek: Discovery	Lt. Commander Paul Stamets	Regular cast/Lieutenant Paul Stamets (Mirror) 1st and 3rd season
2018	13 Reasons Why	Pastor	Episode: "Bye"
2019	Carpool Karaoke: The Series	Himself	Episode: "Star Trek: Discovery Cast"
2019	Rent: Live	Himself	Cameo
2020	Equal	Harry Hay	Docuseries
2021	Celebrating America	Himself	Virtual Concert for the Inauguration of Joe Biden
2026	The Beauty (TV series)	The Scientist	Episode Beautiful Brothers

=== Theatre ===
Year	Production	Role	Notes
1981–1982	The Little Prince and the Aviator	The Little Prince	Broadway; never opened
1982	Youth is Broken	Unknown	Off-Broadway
1982	Evita	Children's Chorus member	Regional, became National Tour
1982	The King and I	Louis	National Tour
1986	Precious Sons	Freddy	Broadway; Mar. 20 – May 10
1990–1992	Six Degrees of Separation	Ben	Broadway; Nov. 8, 1990 – Jan. 5, 1992
1992	The Destiny of Me	Alexander Weeks	Off-Broadway
1993	Sophistry	Jack Kahn	Off-Broadway
1994	Trafficking in Broken Hearts	Bobby	Off-Broadway
1995	Raised in Captivity	Dylan Taylor Sinclair/Roger	Off-Broadway
1995	Rent	Mark Cohen	Off-Broadway
1996–1997	Rent	Mark Cohen	Broadway
1997	Rent	Mark Cohen	National Tour
1998	Rent	Mark Cohen	West End, London
1998	Bright Lights, Big City	Unknown	Off-Broadway
1999	You're a Good Man, Charlie Brown	Charlie Brown	Broadway; Feb. 4 – Jun. 13
2001	Nocturne	The Son	Berkeley Repertory Theatre; written by brother Adam Rapp
2002	Henry V	King Henry V	Commonwealth Shakespeare Company
2003	Hedwig and the Angry Inch	Hedwig Robinson	City Theatre
2003	Private Jokes Public Places	William	Off-Broadway
2004	Little Shop of Horrors	Seymour Krelbourn	National tour
2005	The 24 Hour Plays	Trisan	Broadway; special benefit production
2005	Feeling Electric	Dr. Madden	New York Musical Theatre Festival; earlier version of Next to Normal
2006	Rent	Mark Cohen	Broadway; 10th anniversary reunion concert
2007	Rent	Mark Cohen	Broadway; Jul. 30 – Oct. 7
2007	Spalding Gray: Stories Left to Tell	Performer	Off-Broadway
2007–2014	Without You	Himself	One-man show with music based on his memoir
2008	Some Americans Abroad	Henry McNeil	Off-Broadway
2009	Rent	Mark Cohen	National tour
2012	POP!	Andy Warhol	City Theatre
2014–2015	If/Then	Lucas	Broadway; Mar. 30, 2014 – Mar. 22, 2015
2015–2016	If/Then	Lucas	National tour; Oct. 13, 2015 – Aug. 15, 2016
2022–2023	Without You	Himself	Off-Broadway: One-man show with music based on his memoir

=== Discography ===
Year	Title	Notes
1996	Rent (original Broadway cast recording)	Solos on twenty-two tracks
1999	You're a Good Man, Charlie Brown (new Broadway cast recording)	Solos on nine tracks
2000	Look Around	Solo album
2012	Without You (original cast recording)	Solo album
2014	If/Then (original Broadway cast recording)	Solos on six tracks
2016	Acoustically Speaking: Live at Feinstein's/54 Below	Solos on fourteen tracks; live concert with Adam Pascal

=== Video games ===
Year	Title	Role	Notes
2019	Star Trek Online: Awakening	Paul Stamets	
2023	Stray Gods: The Roleplaying Musical	Orpheus	

== Bibliography ==
- Without You: A Memoir of Love, Loss, and the Musical Rent (Simon & Schuster, 2006)

== Awards and nominations ==
Year	Award	Category	Nominee	Result
1986	Outer Critics Circle Award	Outstanding Actor in a Musical	Precious Sons	Won
1986	Drama Desk Award	Outstanding Actor in a Musical	Precious Sons	Nominated
1996	Obie Award	Special Citations	Rent	Won
2001	ACC Award	Best Ensemble Cast	A Beautiful Mind	Nominated
2001	Screen Actors Guild Award	Outstanding Performance by a Cast in a Motion Picture	A Beautiful Mind	Nominated
2005	Stinkers Bad Movie Award	Worst Song Performance	Rent	Nominated
2006	Broadcast Film Critics Association Award	Best Song Performance	Rent	Nominated
2006	Broadcast Film Critics Association Award	Best Acting Ensemble	Rent	Nominated
2006	OFTA Film Award	Best Adapted Music	Rent	Nominated
2014	Broadway.com Audience Award	Favorite Featured Actor in a Musical	If/Then	Won
2017	The Advocate's Person of the Year	—N/a	—N/a	Finalist
