= Psych season 1 =

Psych
- Season 1
- The DVD cover of the first season of Psych
- Starring: James Roday; Dulé Hill; Timothy Omundson; Anne Dudek; Corbin Bernsen; Maggie Lawson
- No. of episodes: 15

Release
- Original network: USA Network
- Original release: July 7, 2006 – March 2, 2007

Season chronology
- Next → Season 2

The first season of Psych originally aired in the United States on the USA Network television network between July 7, 2006 and March 2, 2007. Produced by Universal Cable Productions and Tagline Television, the series was created by Steve Franks, who served as executive producer with Kelly Kulchak and Chris Henze.

The comedy-drama series focuses on Shawn Spencer (James Roday), a police consultant who pretends to be psychic, and his assistant Burton "Gus" Guster, a pharmaceuticals salesman. The season consisted of an extended pilot episode and fourteen 43-minute episodes, which aired at 10:00 p.m. on Fridays. Franks conceived the idea for the show when producers at Columbia Pictures requested he pitch them ideas for a TV program while he was working on the film Big Daddy. Initially rejected, the concept was shelved for several years until Franks collaborated with Kulchak to create an hour-long TV show. USA Network picked up the program, initially ordering an eleven-episode season.

Overall, the first season has received generally positive reviews from critics. Initially, the show was met with mixed reviews, with episodes later in the season receiving generally positive reception. Many critics compared the series to its lead-in program, Monk, leading to negative opinions on the program's originality. The premiere episode was watched by approximately 6.1 million viewers, making it the highest-rated scripted series premiere for a cable network. However, ratings decreased for the following episodes, with the next highest-rated episode achieving just 4.76 million viewers, according to the Nielsen ratings. The season finale, "Scary Sherry: Bianca's Toast", received the best reviews of the season and saw an increase in viewership.

== Cast ==
=== Main cast ===
- James Roday as Shawn Spencer
- Dulé Hill as Burton "Gus" Guster
- Timothy Omundson as Carlton Lassiter
- Anne Dudek as Lucinda Barry ("Pilot" only)
- Corbin Bernsen as Henry Spencer
- Maggie Lawson as Juliet O'Hara

=== Recurring cast ===
- Kirsten Nelson as interim police chief Karen Vick
- Liam James, Josh Hayden, and Kyle Pejpar as Young Shawn Spencer
- Sage Brocklebank as police officer Buzz McNab
- Carlos McCullers II, Julien Hill, and Isaah Brown as Young Gus
- Patricia Idlette as Police Officer Allen

=== Guest stars ===
- Don S. Davis as Camden McCallum Sr. ("Pilot")
- Pascale Hutton as Katarina McCallum ("Pilot")
- Richard Zeman as Miklos Prochazka ("Spellingg Bee")
- Bud Collins as himself ("Spellingg Bee")
- Christine Chatelain as Lacey Maxwell ("Speak Now or Forever Hold Your Piece")
- Tom Butler as Attorney General Maxwell ("Speak Now or Forever Hold Your Piece")
- Gina Holden as Bethany ("Speak Now or Forever Hold Your Piece")
- Diego Klattenhoff as Dylan Maxwell ("Speak Now or Forever Hold Your Piece")
- Anne Marie DeLuise as Raylene Wilcroft ("Woman Seeking Dead Husband: Smokers Okay, No Pets")
- Steve Bacic as David Morrison Wilcroft ("Woman Seeking Dead Husband: Smokers Okay, No Pets")
- Ben Cotton as Barlow ("Woman Seeking Dead Husband: Smokers Okay, No Pets")
- Scott Michael Campbell as Wes Hildenbach ("9 Lives")
- Carlos Jacott as Terrance ("9 Lives")
- Peter Michael Goetz as Griffin Mahoney ("Weekend Warriors")
- Claire Coffee as Sally Reynolds ("Weekend Warriors")
- John Ross Bowie as George Cheslow ("Weekend Warriors")
- Frank Whaley as Robert Dunn ("Who Ya Gonna Call?")
- Bre Blair as Talia ("Shawn vs. the Red Phantom")
- George Takei as himself ("Shawn vs. the Red Phantom")
- Wanda Cannon as Leslie Breyfogle ("Shawn vs. the Red Phantom")
- Ashley Williams as Trish Connors ("Forget Me Not")
- Lisa Banes as Edna Crocker ("Forget Me Not")
- Kurtwood Smith as Brett Connors ("Forget Me Not")
- Richard Kind as Hugo ("From the Earth to Starbucks")
- Tamara Mello as Amanda ("From the Earth to Starbucks")
- Nicole Lyn as Jessica ("From the Earth to Starbucks")
- Ryan Robbins as Vernon Stallings ("From the Earth to Starbucks")
- Mayte Garcia as Darcy ("He Loves Me, He Loves Me Not, He Loves Me, Oops He's Dead")
- Colin Cunningham as Marvin ("He Loves Me, He Loves Me Not, He Loves Me, Oops He's Dead")
- Teryl Rothery as Glenda ("He Loves Me, He Loves Me Not, He Loves Me, Oops He's Dead")
- Michael Weston as Adam Hornstock ("Cloudy... With a Chance of Murder")
- Jolie Jenkins as Sandra Panitch ("Cloudy... With a Chance of Murder")
- Donnelly Rhodes as Judge Horace Leland ("Cloudy... With a Chance of Murder")
- Keegan Connor Tracy as Priscilla Osterman ("Cloudy... With a Chance of Murder")
- Christopher Moynihan as Tom ("Game, Set... Muuurder?")
- Thomas Kopache as Leonard Sirtis ("Game, Set... Muuurder?")
- Dan Lauria as Bill Peterson ("Poker? I Barely Know Her")
- Kris Lemche as Brandon Peterson ("Poker? I Barely Know Her")
- Debra Mooney as Mrs. Lassiter ("Poker? I Barely Know Her")
- Chris W. Martin as J. P. Berger ("Poker? I Barely Know Her")
- Mercedes Ruehl as Detective Goochberg ("Scary Sherry: Bianca's Toast")
- Shannon Woodward as Alice Bundy ("Scary Sherry: Bianca's Toast")
- Alexandra Breckenridge as Becky ("Scary Sherry: Bianca's Toast")
- Chelan Simmons as Bianca ("Scary Sherry: Bianca's Toast")

== Episodes ==
List of Psych season 1 episodes
No. overall	No. in season	Title	Directed by	Written by	Original release date	U.S. viewers (millions)
1	1	"Pilot"	Michael Engler	Steve Franks	July 7, 2006	6.06
When Shawn Spencer offers a tip to the local police department regarding a crime, he becomes subject to questions about where he is getting his information. Realizing that he cannot convince the detective interrogating him that he is merely hyperobservant, he resorts to the lie that he is psychic. Following this proclamation, the police request Shawn's help on a case regarding the kidnapping of the son of a local textile company owner. Shawn recruits his childhood friend, Burton "Gus" Guster to help him. Meanwhile, Detective Carlton Lassiter's relationship with Detective Barry is exposed. Shawn and Gus discover the son's cabin, and alert the police. They discover the boy and his friend dead, as an apparent murder-suicide. Shawn does not believe this, and goes to his father, Henry Spencer for help. Shawn believes that the boy's father is the killer, and after investigating, proves his theory.
2	2	"Spellingg Bee"	Mel Damski	Steve Franks	July 14, 2006	4.71
Shawn meets a young woman, Juliet O'Hara, at a local restaurant, where she turns out to be a cop. At a nearby spelling bee, a contestant faints, and Shawn and Gus are brought in to investigate. They interview all of the contestants, getting no leads, until the spellmaster for the bee falls to his death. The case becomes a murder investigation. Gus believes the spellmaster's lunch was poisoned; Shawn takes it to Henry for analysis. After making a deal with Henry, Shawn is injured in a severe car accident. Gus looks into the case while Shawn is recovering, and finds several leads. Henry confirms that the food was poisoned, and after breaking into the spellmaster's booth, Shawn discovers that everything that had occurred was covering up one of the contestants cheating. He reveals this to police, who arrest the cheater and his father.
3	3	"Speak Now or Forever Hold Your Piece"	Michael Zinberg	Steve Franks	July 21, 2006	4.69
A five-million dollar engagement ring disappears from a hotel vault. Shawn and Gus overhear the police discussing the case, and decide to take the case on their own. They visit the hotel where the ring was held, and discover several things from the police. Shawn gathers keys to all of the wedding ceremony's attendees, and talks with them. He becomes involved in the wedding, and helps with much of the preparations. While attempting to gather more clues, Shawn discoverers the police's main suspect dead. He "psychically" reveals this to the police. During the wedding ceremony, Shawn realizes who the perpetrator is, and interrupts the ceremony to reveal it.
4	4	"Woman Seeking Dead Husband: Smokers Okay, No Pets"	Jeff Melman	Steve Franks	July 28, 2006	4.35
Two men are paroled after serving four years in prison for robbery. The widow of a third robber is at risk of being attacked by the two men so they can find the money they stole; she hires Shawn and Gus to find the stolen money so she will not have to worry about the two men. While Shawn and Gus begin their investigation, detectives Lassiter and O'Hara tail the paroled criminals in hope that they will lead them to the money. Shawn and Gus travel to a cemetery run by the woman's cousin, where they discover that her husband is alive and well. Shawn tries to put the robbers back in jail, but realizes his client is actually the criminal, and rushes back to have her arrested and find the money.
5	5	"9 Lives"	Matt Shakman	Andy Berman	August 4, 2006	4.72
Shawn and Gus visit the scene of a suspected suicide, one of several in a short span of time. He finds signs point to murder, and uses the victim's cat to help keep the case open. Another suicide is reported shortly afterwards, strengthening Shawn's theory. Finding no clues, Shawn and Gus revisit the beginning of the string of "suicides", and talk with the brother of the original victim. They discover that every victim called the same stress line before they died. They open up a fake business in the same building as the stress line, in order to gather more information. Shawn realizes that a repairman has been working on phone lines outside the stress line for several weeks. He discovers Officer McNab recently called the line, and breaks into McNab's apartment just before the killer can strike again.
6	6	"Weekend Warriors"	John Fortenberry	Douglas Steinberg	August 11, 2006	4.76
Detective Lassiter is leading a Civil War reenactment when he discovers one of the actors dead. Although evidence points to an accident, he and Shawn and Gus believe it was murder. While Shawn and Gus visit their prime suspect, a dentist and former friend, Lassiter interrupts and arrests the man. They realize that the man could not have been the killer, and join the regiment in order to find out more. They visit a Civil War memorabilia collector, who tells them about his involvement in the reenactment. While in a practice run, Shawn realizes who the real killer was, and reveals it shortly after the actual reenactment.
7	7	"Who Ya Gonna Call?"	Michael Lange	Kerry Lenhart & John J. Sakmar	August 18, 2006	4.89
Shawn and Gus are investigating the death of a psychiatrist when they are removed by Detective Lassiter. Before they can close the Psych office for the day, a man arrives and tells them that a ghost is trying to kill him. They decide to quickly help the man; however, they stay the night at his house, and are nearly killed in a fire while they sleep. Meanwhile, the police are looking for the psychiatrist's last patient. Shawn and Gus visit the man's old girlfriend, but discover nothing. While returning, they are nearly hit by a drunk driver. They return to their client's house, and discover a secret room filled with women's clothing. Shawn realizes the man has multiple personalities. They race to another psychiatrist's office, and stop the man's violent personality from killing the doctor.
8	8	"Shawn vs. the Red Phantom"	John T. Kretchmer	Anupam Nigam	August 25, 2006	4.64
Detective O'Hara asks Shawn and Gus to investigate a missing persons case for an 18-year-old boy. They visit the boy's house, where they discover a large amount of money hidden in his bedroom, and evidence suggesting he went to a comic book convention. They pose as assistants for George Takei to get in, where they discover that the boy ran a popular blog, and received the money as a bribe for writing a good review for a movie being produced. Two of the executives for the production company go missing. While this is happening, Chief Vick's water breaks, and she is taken to the hospital by Detective Lassiter. Gus realizes that the whole crime is based on a previous comic book, and Shawn "psychically" solves everything. Chief Vick gives birth to her daughter in the hospital.
9	9	"Forget Me Not"	Mel Damski	Lee Goldberg & William Rabkin	January 19, 2007	3.78
Henry's former boss visits Shawn and Gus for help; he witnessed a murder, but due to Alzheimer's disease he cannot remember who was killed, and by whom. They visit a coffeehouse where the man might have seen the murder, and Shawn discovers who it was. Meanwhile, a woman visits the police station, asking about her husband, who was the murder victim. Their client believes one of his old enemies committed the murder, but cannot prove it, as the death was made to look like a puma attack. They investigate, and find evidence that the death was covered up. Shawn and Gus talk with the woman, who reveals details to them that make them suspect that the victim was related to their possible suspect. They look into the lead, and realize that it was their suspect's wife that was the actual murderer.
10	10	"From the Earth to the Starbucks"	Michael Zinberg	Steve Franks	January 26, 2007	3.70
Shawn talks with Detective Lassiter at a bar, and gets details on the potential homicide of an astronomer. Lassiter is depressed about the fact that he has not been able to solve a crime in a while, so Shawn decided to solve the case, but credit Lassiter with everything. Shawn gets a job at the observatory where the man worked, and surprises Gus, who visits the building frequently. Shawn breaks into the astronomy lab, looks through the log books, and discovers a missing page. He realizes that the other astronomer likely killed his co-worker. Shawn and Gus try to break into the man's house; while there, they notice a weird flower, and decide to take it. Gus discovers that the living astronomer is about to announce something big. They find out the flower is toxic, and Shawn realizes that this was how the man was murdered, and they catch the man.
11	11	"He Loves Me, He Loves Me Not, He Loves Me, Oops He's Dead!"	Tim Matheson	Andy Berman	February 2, 2007	3.81
Detective Lassiter gives Shawn and Gus a case involving a man who believes he was abducted by aliens. Shawn discovers clues from the man to prove that the man was not abducted, but was drugged and likely robbed. When Shawn goes to where the man says he woke up, the police are already there with another man, in the same situation. Shortly afterwards, the police discover another man in the same place, but this time, the victim is dead. A lead takes Shawn to an Irish-themed pub, where speed-dating is held. To get more information, Shawn, Gus, and several detectives go undercover in the speed dating event. They discover several suspects, but none could have been the perpetrator. Police arrest the man running the event, who Shawn realizes is the actual criminal, as well as his wife, who is disguised as one of the speed daters.
12	12	"Cloudy... With a Chance of Murder"	Lev L. Spiro	Andy Berman	February 9, 2007	3.60
While visiting the courthouse to get his impounded motorcycle, Shawn notices a woman pick up and throw away a piece of trash. While watching TV, Shawn discovers the woman is accused of murdering a weatherman. He is already convinced that she is innocent. Shawn and Gus get jobs as legal consultants for the woman's defense in order to investigate. In a visit to the weather station, they find a number of suspects. They appear for the beginning of the trial, and find detectives Lassiter and O'Hara to be helping the district attorney in the case. The DA presents a video of the murder, which seemingly confirms that the woman is guilty. Shawn takes the video to Henry's house, who gives him advice on the case. After repeatedly viewing the tape, Shawn notices a small detail to prove his client's innocence. He presents this in court, and gets a full confession from the true killer. Note: The episode would later be remade in the final season episode "Remake A.K.A. Cloudy... With a Chance of Improvement". According to series star James Roday, the cast and crew considered it to be one of the weaker episodes of the series, citing the lack of the humour compared to the rest of the series. As a result, the episode was completely redone to improve on those issues.
13	13	"Game, Set... Muuurder?"	James L. Conway	Anupam Nigam	February 16, 2007	3.20
Shawn is patrolling the police station when Chief Vick asks him to try to locate a missing tennis star. Gus is out of town at an event for work. After preliminary investigation, Shawn convinces Gus's boss to let him leave. They visit the woman's house, and discover several clues which lead them to a local house. When they arrive, the police are already there, loading the barely alive woman into an ambulance. Police are convinced that the star's former stalker is the kidnapper, but Shawn is convinced that she is having an affair, and her boyfriend is the perpetrator. Shawn goes to Henry for advice; while at Henry's house, Shawn notices several issues with the crime scene photos, and goes back to the house to investigate. After going back over the evidence, he and Gus realize who the secret boyfriend is, and reveal it to the police.
14	14	"Poker? I Barely Know Her"	Joanna Kerns	Kerry Lenhart, John J. Sakmar & Douglas Steinberg	February 23, 2007	3.74
Shawn and Gus are sitting in the Psych office when Henry enters, insults the office, and tells them he's their client, informing them that the son of his friend has gone missing. Henry's friend tells them that his son stole $30,000 from him, and disappeared. At the police station, Detective O'Hara talks to Chief Vick about throwing a birthday party for Detective Lassiter, which Vick tells her is a bad idea. Shawn and Gus visit the boy's former apartment, where they find a card leading them to an underground poker game at a plant nursery. While playing online poker, Gus finds the boy, and discovers that he owes large amounts of money to the man who owns the underground poker operation. He steals money from his father again, and enters a poker tournament. Shawn takes his place, and wins every match until he is against the underground operation leader. Shawn realizes the man is cheating, and busts him, winning the tournament and the money. Meanwhile, Juliet throws Lassiter's party, but accidentally invites several people who Lassiter arrested on multiple occasions, mistakenly assuming his notebook entries to refer to friends instead of suspects.
15	15	"Scary Sherry: Bianca's Toast"	John Landis	Steve Franks & James Roday	March 2, 2007	4.48
In 1987, Shawn and Gus witness an insane woman jump from a window of a mental institution; in the present, a girl falls to her death through the same window after being chased. Detective O'Hara is working undercover in the girl's sorority, and Shawn and Gus are asked to help. While at the sorority house, they are attacked by the girl's "ghost", which turns out to be man-made. Meanwhile, Detective Lassiter is assigned to a trigger-happy elderly rookie. Shawn discovers that the girl's longtime best friend is likely the "phantom". Gus discovers that her death was likely an accident. Shawn realizes that one of the sorority sisters is the target of the "phantom", but she is killed before he can get to her. Several of the sorority girls admit that they accidentally killed the girl, but are being attacked by someone. Shawn visits the girl's friend's house, and realizes that she is the killer. She invites O'Hara to a candlelight vigil at the mental institution, where she tries to kill her. Shawn, Gus, and Lassiter arrive at the last second to help Juliet.

== Production ==
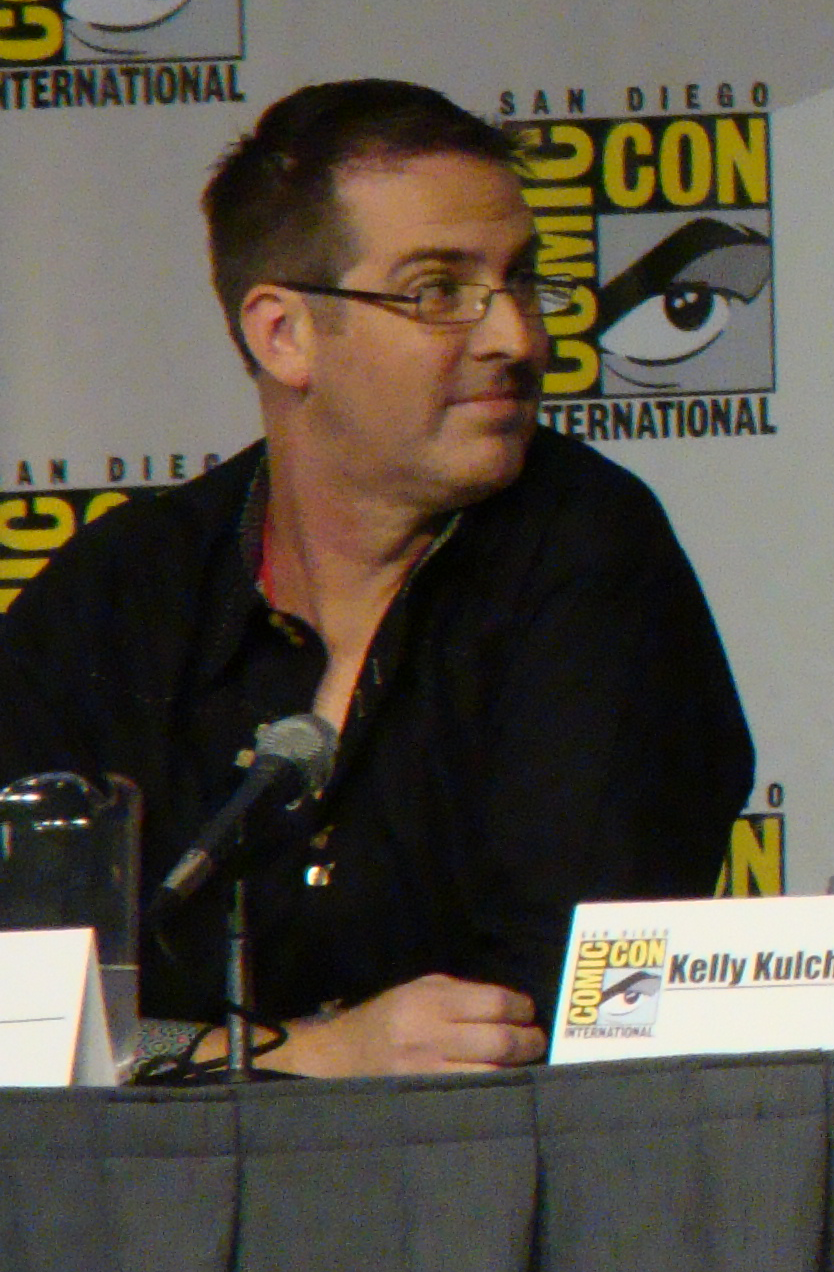
Steve Franks created Psych after his pitch for the film Big Daddy

=== Conception and development ===
Steve Franks originally conceived the concept for Psych while working as the lead writer for the 1999 film Big Daddy. After he successfully pitched the film to producers with Columbia Pictures, Franks was requested to come up with ideas for five new TV programs. He presented the shows to Columbia, who rejected all proposals. Among the outlines he presented was the source for Psych. After the programs were rejected, he shelved the ideas. Franks would not reopen the idea for Psych until several years later, when he met with producer Kelly Kulchak about creating a one-hour long TV program. After discussion, Franks presented the idea for Psych, which Kulchak deemed to be "brilliant".

After finalizing an episode draft for Psych, Franks and Kulchak pitched the show to all major TV networks, including the Fox Broadcasting Company, NBC, ABC, and CBS. The show was rejected by each network they presented the idea to. Kulchak stated that "it was a great pitch and that everybody laughed, but no one wanted to buy it". She attributed its rejection to the show's unique comedy–drama format, which was virtually unused by a TV show at the time. They then pitched the show to several cable networks, where it was again rejected. The final network Franks and Kulchak pitched the show to was USA Network. The network "loved the concept", and decided to produce the show.

I chose a different path, and so I sort of thought about taking that a little further. When I was a kid, we'd be in a restaurant, [and my dad] would actually ask me how many people were wearing hats in the restaurant. And he was training me in his own way to follow his footsteps. And then of course I chose the one profession he has no concept of in the world.

— Steve Franks, speaking about his inspiration for creating Psych.

Franks has cited multiple sources as inspiration for the show. His father, as well as multiple uncles, are former Los Angeles Police Department officers; Franks has given real-life experiences as direct inspiration for numerous events which occurred in the first season. Franks later explained that his comedic inspiration for the program was that he always "thought it would be fun to apply my comic sensibility to a cop show". He has since explained that the inspiration for the fake-psychic concept in the show was due to a longtime wish to write a show about a man with "no psychic abilities but just had a great grasp of details". The program's unique comedy drama format has been explained by producers to have been inspired by several 1980s detective shows. A prominent source cited by executives and actors was the TV show Moonlighting. Other sources include programs Remington Steele and Simon & Simon.

USA Network first announced their potential broadcasting of Psych on June 17, 2005. The network stated that they had requested a pilot episode of the series, to be managed by Tagline Productions. The original working name for the series was "Psyche". It was announced on August 30 that the production for the show's pilot episode would begin shortly, and the episode would likely air in 2006. On January 5, 2006, USA announced the Psyche would be competing against In Plain Sight, written by David Maples, and Underfunded, written by David Breckman, for air time and broadcasting slots. Later in January, the network confirmed that the pilot episode for the show would air later that year. They also announced that the show's name had changed to Psych. On February 21, 2006, USA Network announced that it had ordered eleven one-hour episode scripts for Psych. They confirmed that the show would take Monk's Friday night time slot, and that the pilot episode, planned to be two hours in length, would be broadcast on July 7.

=== Broadcast ===
Psych's first season aired directly after hit-series Monk in the hope that it would help bring in high ratings.

Psych's first season commenced broadcasting in the United States on July 7, 2006, and ended with the airing of "Scary Sherry: Bianca's Toast" on March 2, 2007. The season's first eight episodes aired during July and August 2006, while the remaining seven were broadcast from January through March of the next year. For the entire first season, Psych aired at a 10:00 P.M. ET/PT time slot on Fridays. Every episode in the season, save the premiere, ran for an hour, including commercials. Twelve of the season's fifteen episodes were 43 minutes in length, while "Speak Now or Forever Hold Your Piece" and "Woman Seeking Dead Husband: Smokers Okay, No Pets" ran for one minute less, and "Pilot" was a special extended episode. The episode "Pilot" ran for 66 minutes, in an hour-and-a-half time slot with commercials. The international version of the episode ran for an extended 90 minutes. USA Network's sister broadcast network NBC aired episodes from season 1 on August 7 and 14, 2006.

The show's time slot had previously been occupied by the first season of USA Network's revival of Kojak, which lasted for ten episodes in mid-2005 before being cancelled. After Kojak's cancellation, the slot was replaced by hit series Monk. The show was entering its fifth season, and received very high ratings in the Friday timeslot. Hoping that Psych would share in Monk's successful ratings, USA Network executives moved the fifth season to a 9:00 P.M. slot on the same day, airing directly before Psych. The pairing was well-received, being called a "well-written comedy-mystery block that comprises some of the best two hours on television".

=== Crew ===
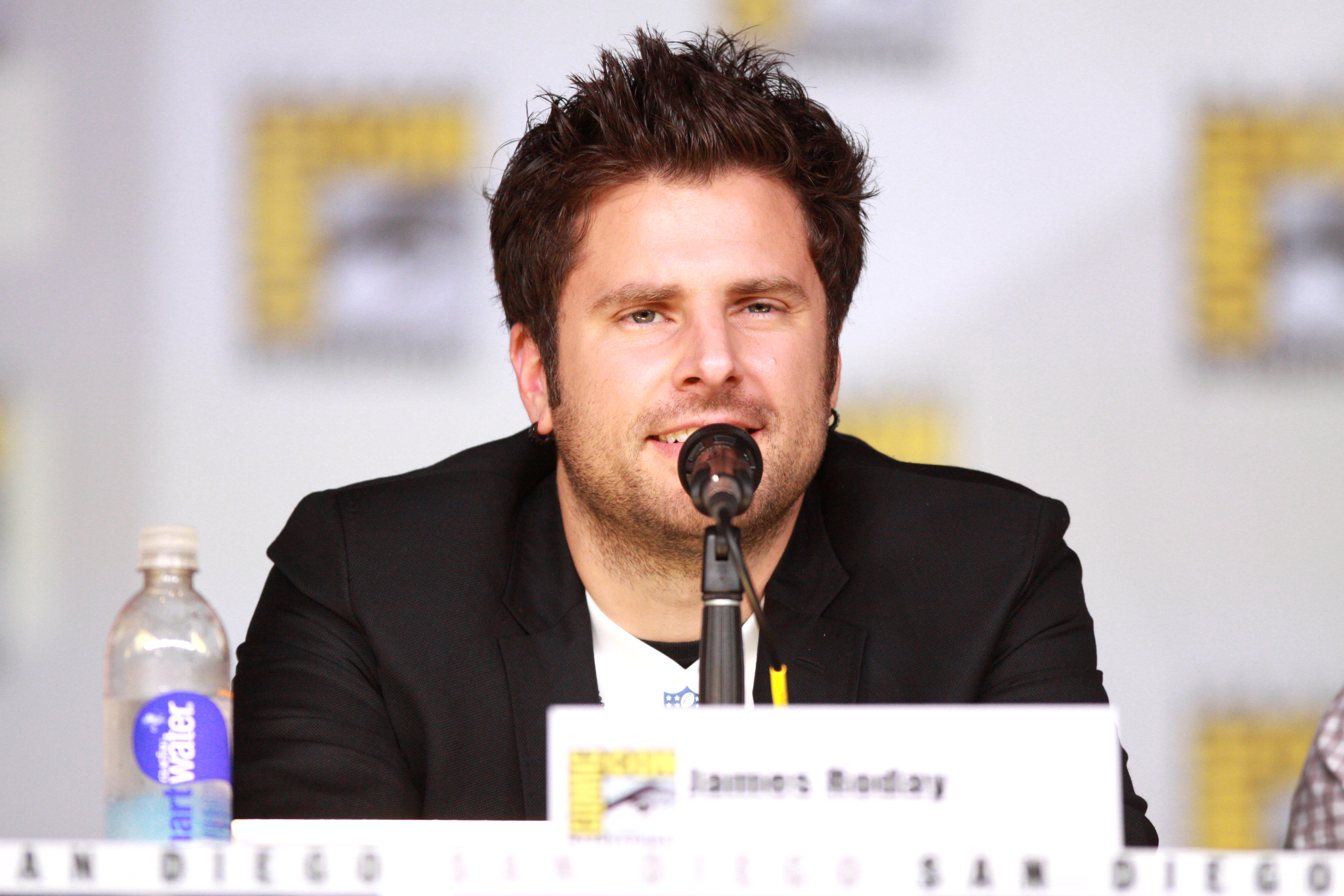
James Roday, who portrays Shawn Spencer on the show, co-wrote the season finale with creator Steve Franks

Tagline Productions and Universal Cable Productions produced the first season of Psych; series creator and showrunner Steve Franks was the executive producer, along with Kelly Kulchak and Tagline executive Chris Henze. Jack Sakmar, Kerry Lenhart, and Mel Damski were co-executive producers, while Paulo De Olviera and Wendy Belt Wallace produced, and Tracey Jeffery was the consulting producer. Erin Smith was the production manager and Michael McMurray was the director of photography, while Allan Lee and Anupam Nigam acted as the season's script editors. David Crabtree, James Ilecic, Allan Lee, and Gordon Rempel were the script editors. Music for the first season was written and composed by Adam Cohen, John Wood, and Brandon Christie.

Michael Engler directed the pilot episode, which was written by Steve Franks. The following three episodes were developed by Franks, who returned to write the season's tenth episode, "From the Earth to the Starbucks", as well as co-authoring the season finale with James Roday. Andy Berman, who would often present scripts which were a few dozen pages too long, wrote the third, eleventh, and twelfth episodes for the season. Executive producers Kerry Lenhart and John J. Sakmar collaborated to write the seventh and fourteenth episodes, with assistance from Douglas Steinberg on the latter. Script editor Anupam Nigam also wrote two episodes. William Rabkin, who would later write a series of novels for the series, collaborated with Lee Goldberg to write the ninth episode.

Executive producer Mel Damski, who had been nominated for the Emmy Award for Outstanding Directing in a Drama for his work on the series Lou Grant, directed the second and ninth episodes of the season. Michael Zinberg, who was working as a director on Monk, was the only other person who directed more than a single episode; he directed two, the third and tenth episodes. The people who directed a single episode were Grey's Anatomy director Jeff Melman, It's Always Sunny in Philadelphia producer Matt Shakman, occasional Rescue Me director John Fortenberry, frequent Dawson's Creek director Michael Lange, frequent Veronica Mars director John T. Kretchmer, Tim Matheson, who played John Hoynes on The West Wing, infrequent Weeds director Lev L. Spiro, long-time Charmed executive producer and director James L. Conway, Growing Pains actress and experienced director Joanna Kerns, and movie writer, director, and actor John Landis.

=== Casting ===
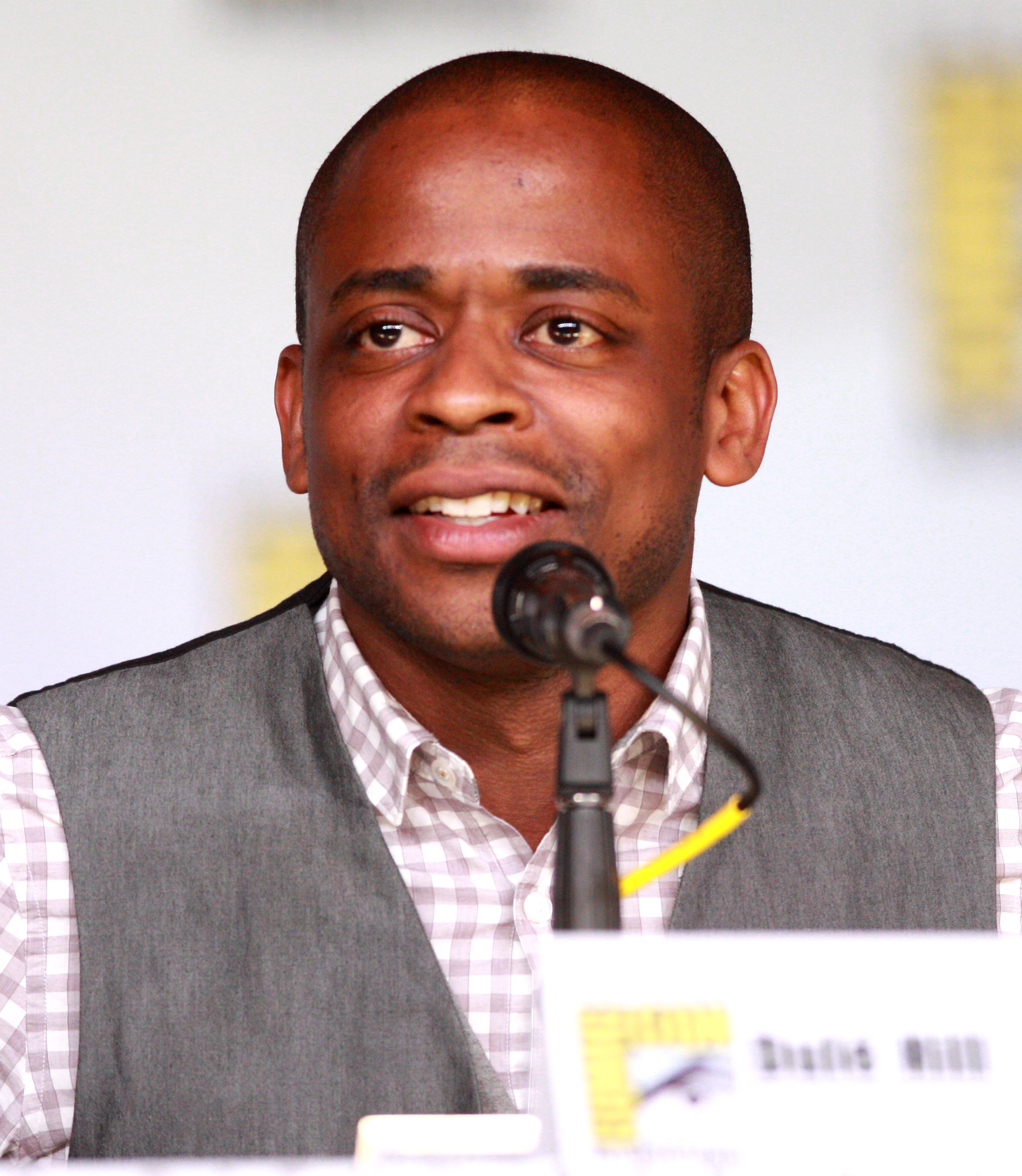
Dulé Hill was cast to a main role after James Roday met with him in his home

Two actors received star billing for the first season, while three additional actors were considered part of the main cast. James Roday Rodriguez portrayed Shawn Spencer, a life-long slacker who uses his hyperobservant ability to claim he is a psychic. Dulé Hill plays Burton "Gus" Guster, a pharmaceutical salesman who is Shawn's best friend. Timothy Omundson portrays detective Carlton Lassiter, the level-headed lead detective for the Santa Barbara Police Department, and Maggie Lawson represents Juliet O'Hara, the department's naive junior detective. Shawn's father, Henry Spencer, a former police officer, is played by Corbin Bernsen and Karen Vick, the pregnant interim police chief is portrayed by Kirsten Nelson. By August 30, James Roday and Dulé Hill had been cast to play the show's main characters. The network also revealed that Corbin Bernsen had been cast as another of the show's major characters. On April 27, USA Network announced that Timothy Omundson and Kirsten Nelson would have starring roles in the episode.

=== Writing ===
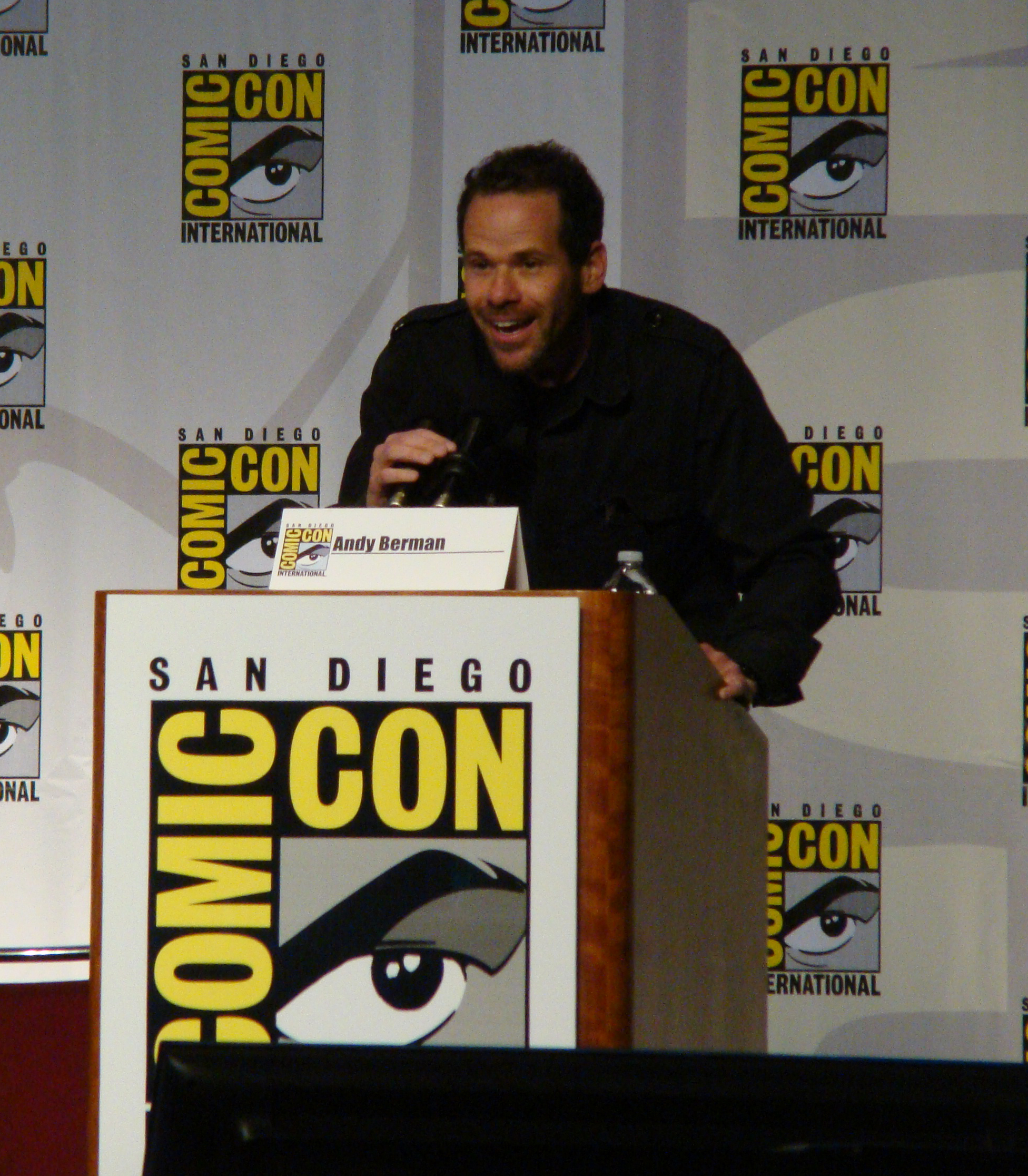
Andy Berman was added to the show's writing team after pitching a one-line episode plot

All fifteen episodes of Psych's first season were written with a stand-alone plot, meaning that no episode built off of a previous one. However, the installments were noted that even though they were stand-alone, episodes often built on each other for character development and would occasionally reference each other, creating a feel of continuity. To save production time, nearly all the pilot episode was adapted from the original pitch to USA Network; the pitch focused on a man who would call in tips to the police department until he finally got mixed up in a situation with the police. The rest of the writing for the episode was added late in pre-production. Corbin Bernsen requested and was granted the addition of two scenes in the installment. Both involved his character confronting Shawn. The episode included multiple flashbacks, which in subsequent episodes were used as an opening scene. In the pilot, flashbacks were also included in the middle of the episode. The majority of alteration to the script occurred with the arrest of the episode's antagonist, a scene which the writers felt was never perfectly right.

While in early development for the series, Franks and the show's writing team consulted several outside sources to help make the show seem more realistic. Franks regularly consulted with his family, especially his father, when writing the police-related aspects of the show. Some scenes from episodes were actually taken directly from the teachings of Franks' father. The opening scene for the pilot episode, where Henry Spencer asks Shawn how many hats are in the room, was a test that the elder Franks would challenge his son with. The show's writers and actors also met with actual psychics before writing and editing portions of episodes. James Roday met with two psychics before his performance in the pilot, and adjusted his performance to make it seem more realistic.

=== Filming ===
Steve Franks and his wife, April, went to Santa Barbara on their honeymoon. At the time, he was developing the idea for Psych. He knew he didn't want a big city atmosphere. He wanted a place that was beautiful.

— Mel Damski, speaking on the decision for the filming location for Psych.

Franks wanted to set Psych in a city that reflected the show's personality; he knew that he did not want the show to be set in a big city atmosphere. While developing Psych, Franks visited Santa Barbara during his honeymoon. He felt that Santa Barbara was the perfect place to set the show, but that they would be unable to film the show there. Executive producer Mel Damski commented the filming of the show, that "We wanted to set and film it in Santa Barbara, but the area doesn’t really have enough crewmembers". After the show was approved, Franks began looking for places to film, settling for Vancouver, British Columbia. He felt that Vancouver was "the next best location" to Santa Barbara. Although he chose to film the show in Vancouver, most of the show is actually filmed in the surrounding communities. About half of each episode is filmed in the Vancouver suburb of White Rock, including most scenes focusing on coastal areas. Portions of the episodes are also filmed in the mountain ranges surrounding Vancouver, and occasionally in the Pacific Ocean around the city.

The episode "Pilot" was filmed entirely on location in and around Vancouver. Due to uncertainty about the show succeeding, producers decided to film the episode at actual locations in the community, instead of on a sound stage. The decision led to several issues while filming. On multiple occasions the film crew had to alter several scenes and repeatedly re-shoot a scene. For the episode's opening, the film crew had only a few feet of space to operate and maneuver the camera. The multiple scenes involving the police station were filmed in a former children's hospital and army barracks and a supposedly "haunted" former insane asylum. The decision to shoot outside also created multiple issues with weather. Filmed in November and December, the temperature while filming was usually between 1°C and 4 °C (33.8°F–39.2 °F). Rain also affected filming, forcing the crew to purchase and use multiple tarps and additional sound equipment.

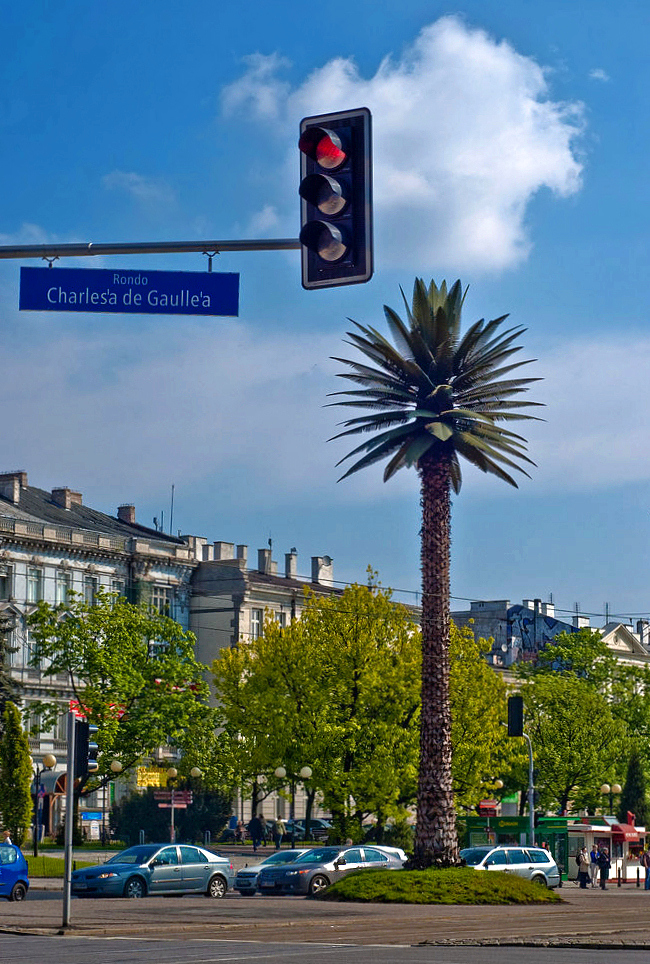
An artificial palm tree. The set designers had to transport eight fake palms between each set while filming

Following the success of the pilot episode and the troubles of filming it, the entire rest of the season was filmed on several sound stages. Aside from an occasional scene in the mountains or city, the majority of each episode is filmed on one of several stages at North Shore Studios. Each episode is allotted a two-week window for filming. The first week is dedicated entirely to construct and alter the sets for that week's episode. In order to make the show seem more convincing, the set designers purchased and imported eight artificial palm trees, surf boards, and large quantities of both real and fake newspapers. Several of the props, including the palm trees, had to be moved between sets while filming. The second week is devoted entirely to filming, which often requires several takes for each scene.

The majority of the sets for the show are located within two warehouses on the North Shore Studios property. The police station occupies nearly an entire warehouse, while assorted other sets, like the Psych office, take up the other one. Henry Spencer's house was originally filmed at actual houses, moving from the one used in the pilot to one closer to the ocean before filming the rest of the season. Most of the sets were constructed shortly after filming for the pilot episode concluded. However, the design team disliked how some of the sets turned out, so several were altered before filming for the next episodes began. Before the filming for "Spellingg Bee" began, the Psych office was significantly expanded, becoming the second largest stage for the show and the office for the police chief was rearranged and repainted to brighten it.

Although most episodes were filmed almost entirely on main stages and a few surrounding areas, a few installments required special sets and filming areas. Several parts of "Spellingg Bee" were filmed in a set designed to look like Santa Barbara's Arlington Theater, while other portions were filmed in a basement on the North Shore facility. For "9 Lives", the crew created a large, complex set for a fake suicide hotline company. A few scenes in the episode were filmed in a large apartment complex, portions of which they rented out for other episodes, like "Poker? I Barely Know Her". It was one of several episodes where the seven-day time restraint affected numerous shots. The majority of the episode "Weekend Warriors" was filmed outdoors, which led to many problems. The episode's filming was the most troublesome of any for the first season. Numerous logistical errors caused long delays and re-shoots for the installment. The episode nearly caused a delay in the entire show, but production on it was replaced by work on "9 Lives", and was continued after that episode was finished. It was one of several episodes which were filmed out of running order.

=== Music ===
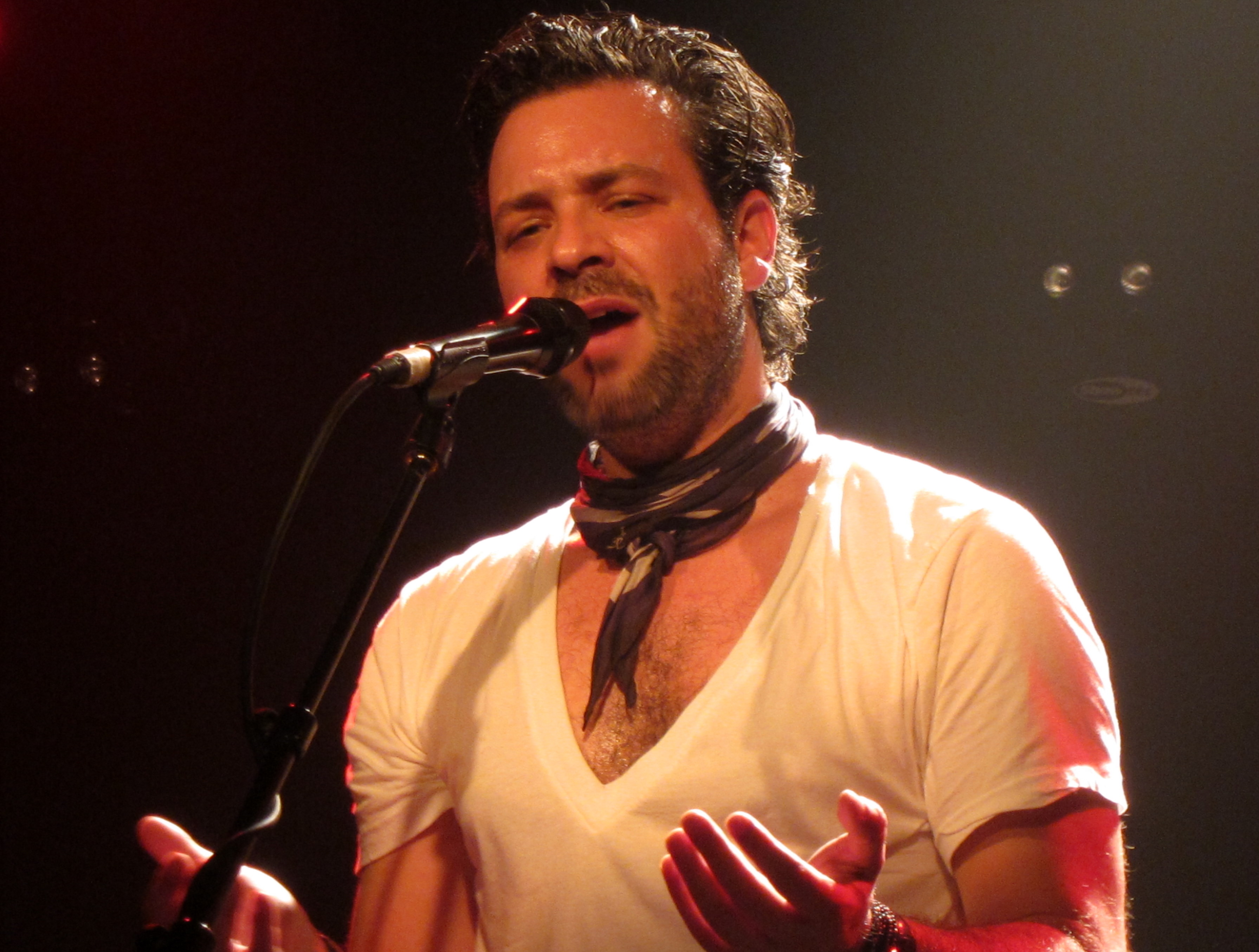
Musician Adam Cohen helped compose much of the first season's music

The show's theme song, which functions as the main title music, was composed by the group The Friendly Indians. The song, titled "I Know, You Know" was written and performed by the band, which both Steve Franks and writer Tim Meltreger are members of, as the lead guitarist and vocalist, respectively. The group formed in 1991, and the song was their first original performance. The group went on hiatus due to the series, not performing from 2006 until 2010. A shortened portion of the song is actually used for the show. Other music for the show was composed by a team of musicians Adam Cohen, John Wood, and Brandon Christie. Music was generally used on the show sparingly, usually as a background during a scene. One of the few important instances of music was the short performance of a song called "Dazzle and Stretch". The song was an improvisation by Roday, which the crew loved. Just before the episode was given to the network, the music team composed and added an original piece to the scene. Most other instances of music were the playing of a radio, which was most apparent in "9 Lives".

== Reception ==
=== Critical reception ===
Critical reception to Psych's first season was mixed. At the media review aggregator website Rotten Tomatoes the first season currently holds a 50% approval rating from critics, giving it an overall "rotten" rating. The score is based on reviews from twelve critics who gave the season an average rating of 4.9/10. Among the site's top critics, it holds a 38% approval rating with an average score of 5.4/10. The site's consensus states "Its premise is sure to draw comparisons to Monk, and Psych's lead character that is an acquired taste at best [sic]". At review aggregator Metacritic the season currently holds a rating of 58 (out of 100) from mainstream critics, indicating "mixed or average" reviews. The rating is based on twenty critical opinions, consisting of nine positive, eight mixed, and three negative reviews.

Linda Stasi, writing for the New York Post gave the show a highly positive review, saying that "it's not only laugh-out-loud-until-soda-squirts-out-of-your-nose funny, but it's also perfectly cast" and "'Psych' is just terrific". Writing for the Chicago Tribune, television critic Maureen Ryan presented a positive review of the show, saying that the writers "manage to send up the trend in their clever new 'psychic detective' show while also charming the socks off the viewer" and that "if you like Monk, you'll probably love this show, which may actually be even more enjoyable". Seattle Post-Intelligencer television critic Melanie McFarland gave the show a generally favorable review, calling it "one of those happy collisions of an intelligent script and an appealing cast" and "more than adequate, thankfully for us". In his review of the show for USA Today, critic Robert Bianco gave the pilot episode three out of four stars and called it "an auspicious debut", adding that the show's "gimmick allows for some clever comic jibes while creating some useful dramatic tension".

In a more mixed review, Variety's Brian Lowry said that while "the 90-minute premiere does at least establish a premise with potential legs", "'Psych' isn’t nearly as much fun as it ought to be, offering a breezy but not particularly captivating twist on a very well-worn buddy formula". Amy Finnerty of The Wall Street Journal also presented a mixed opinion of the show, saying that "the premise is promising", but also that Shawn and Gus' relationship "is a tired formula, and the pair's supposedly spontaneous banter feels forced". Tom Gliatto of People magazine gave the show a highly negative review, saying it was "not in the same league. Or astral plane" with Monk and compared it to "watching someone test Christmas lights for faulty bulbs". He gave the series an overall rating of one-and-a-half stars.

The rest of the first season received less mainstream critical attention. Reviews for the first few episodes were polarized; while one critic described several episodes as "unintentionally lackluster", "mildly boring", "a mediocre adventure in detective comedy television", and "drop[ping] in posthaste behind Monk", (Note: Reviewing the series for IGN, Colin Moriarty was highly critical of the show's first few episodes. In his review of "Spellingg Bee", he criticized the "lackluster show quality", assessing the installment "mildly entertaining and mildly boring", calling the show miscast and stating that the minor characters are "rather forgettable". He continued to criticize the show, calling the episode "Speak Now or Forever Hold Your Piece" "sub-par", claiming that "things in Psych simply don't make any sense", and suggesting "you continue to take a pass on Psych and save yourself from the mindlessness of it all". While stating the show was beginning to improve, Moriarty was still negative towards the episode "Woman Seeking Dead Husband:Smokers Okay, No Pets", considering it to be predictable and that its "stride is below average".) another critic used terms like "pretty unique", "will only get stronger from here", and containing "manic personality". (Note: In contrast to Moriarty's reviews, Richard Keller of AOL's TV Squad presented generally positive opinions towards the episodes. For "Spellingg Bee", he called the installment "pretty unique", though with visible flaws. He praised the show's characterization, especially the "fleshing out" of the relationships between major characters. His main criticism of the episode was the weakness of Timothy Omundson's character. He generally praised the following installment, calling it "a very good episode", that "it showed that Psych could be more than just a one trick pony", and that "Psych is finally settling into its niche and, hopefully, will only get stronger from here". His review of "Woman Seeking Dead Husband" was less positive, but he still presented support for the installment, calling it "the funniest episode of the series so far" and praising the development of characters in the police department. His major criticism of the episode was that it did not utilize Corbin Bernsen and lacked proper closure.) As the season progressed, critics from both IGN and TV Squad agreed that the episode quality continuously improved. IGN's Colin Moriarty stated that "Weekend Warriors" was, when "taken at face-value, [...] both laugh-out-loud funny and more clever than we've given it credit for". Richard Keller of TV Squad praised the character development and acting quality of the same episode. The installment "Forget Me Not" was the first of the season to receive a rating of 9 out of 10 from IGN, which on their scale translates to "Amazing". Five of the following six episodes also received the same rating, with one episode given an 8.5 rating.

Several episodes from the first season have retrospectively considered some of the show's best. Writing for The Macomb Daily, editor Amanda Lee named "Scary Sherry: Bianca's Toast", "Shawn vs. the Red Phantom", and "Spellingg Bee" to her list of the show's best installments, and gave "9 Lives" an honorable mention.

=== Accolades ===
Psych's first season received a total of five award nominations, winning one of them. Three of the nominations were for acting on the show. For his performance in portraying Burton "Gus" Guster in the episode "Spellingg Bee", Dulé Hill was nominated to win the award for "Best Actor–Comedy" at the 13th Annual NAMIC Vision Awards. The awards are organized by the National Association for Multi-ethnicity in Communications (NAMIC), and are given for "outstanding achievements in original, multi-ethnic cable programming". Other nominees for the award were Carlos Mencia, Romany Malco, and Damon Wayans. Hill lost the award to Mencia. The International Press Academy recognized James Roday's portrayal of Shawn Spencer by nominating him as the best actor in a comedy or musical series at the 11th Satellite Awards. Other nominees for the award were Steve Carell, James Spader, Ted Danson, Stephen Colbert, and Jason Lee. Spader received the award for his work. Calum Worthy, who appeared as a guest star in the episode "Shawn vs. The Red Phantom" and in the second season episode "If You're So Smart, Then Why Are You Dead", was nominated for Best Performance in a TV Series - Recurring Young Actor at the 29th Young Artist Awards. Presented by the Young Artist Association, the awards honor the best performances by young performers in television. Ten other actors were also nominated, with the award going to Connor Price for his work on The Dead Zone.

In addition to the award nominations for acting, the season also received two nominations for other purposes. The pilot episode received a nomination for Best Comedy Pilot Casting at the 2007 Artios Awards. The Artios Awards are annually presented by the Casting Society of America and recognize the "originality, creativity and the contribution of casting to the overall quality of a project". The awards honor members of the Casting Society, and have been awarded yearly since 1985. Casting for theatrical, film, and television performances are all eligible. Liz Marx was listed as the nominee for the casting; she did not receive the award. The season's only win came at the IIG Awards. The awards are presented yearly by the Independent Investigations Group and recognize "movies, television shows, and people in the entertainment field for promoting scientific knowledge and values". The awards were first presented in 2007, honoring the best and worst representations of science in the media. The show was honored with an Iggie Award at the inaugural ceremony, which was accepted by staff writer Daniel Hsia.

List of awards and nominations for Psych season 1

Year	Award	Category	Recipient	Result	Notes
2006	11th Satellite Awards	Best Actor in a Series, Comedy or Musical	James Roday	Nominated	
2007	Casting Society of America's Artios Awards	Best Comedy Pilot Casting	Liz Marx	Nominated	
2007	Independent Investigations Group Awards	Iggie Award	Daniel Hsia for "Pilot"	Won	
2007	13th NAMIC Vision Awards	Best Actor–Comedy	Dulé Hill for "Spellingg Bee"	Nominated	
2008	29th Young Artist Awards	Best Performance in a TV Series - Recurring Young Actor	Calum Worthy for "If You're So Smart, Then Why Are You Dead?" and "Shawn vs. The Red Phantom"	Nominated	

== DVD release ==
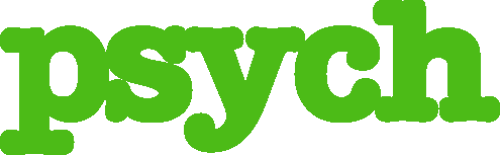
Each Psych DVD release has a different color scheme. The first season uses green, similar to the regular color for the show

The entire first season was officially released on DVD in Region 1 on June 26, 2007, becoming available in both the United States and Canada. The release came nearly a year after the pilot premiered. The box set is simply titled "Psych, the Complete First Season" and is marked with a green color scheme. The release set consists of episodes with Dolby Digital 5.1 surround sound and widescreen format, enhanced for television with a 16:9 aspect ratio, although not in high definition (HD). It received no rating from the MPAA. The set is distributed by NBCUniversal, USA Network's parent company. The same set was released in Region 4 on April 30, 2008, being made available first in Australia. It was first released in Region 2 on January 9, 2008, shortly before the start of season 3, with first availability being made in the United Kingdom. The entire season and each individual episode are available on the iTunes store.

The box set includes all fifteen original episodes that aired on USA Network, which are divided into four separate discs. Subtitles are available in English for people who have impaired hearing, and the only available language for episodes is English. The first disc only contains a single episode, the pilot; however, several special features are also on the disc. Both an audio commentary with Steve Franks, Kelly Kulchak, and Chris Henze and a blooper reel are available for the episode. Also included are character profiles, the extended international version of the pilot, James Roday's audition tape, and two behind-the-scenes featurettes, Psych Revealed and Inside the Writer's Room. The remainind discs have four or five episodes on each and contain a few special features. Included are audio commentaries for the episodes "Spellingg Bee", "9 Lives", "Weekend Warriors", "From the Earth to the Starbucks", and "Scary Sherry: Bianca's Toast" with Franks, Kulchak, and occasionally Dulé Hill, James Roday, Henze, or the episode's respective writer. Deleted scenes are also included for the majority of episodes. The box set's materials combine for a total of eleven hours and nine minutes of footage.

Four episodes, "Pilot", "Spellingg Bee", "From the Earth to the Starbucks", and "Scary Sherry: Bianca's Toast", were included in Psych: Twelve Episodes That Will Make You Happy, a compilation of Steve Franks' favorite episodes (as of season 3). Following season 6, Psych: James and Dule's Top 20 included "Pilot" and "From the Earth to the Starbucks" among Hill's selections and "Scary Sherry" among Roday's.

" Overall, then, it's a pretty neat little package when taken on an episode-by-episode basis. The lack of more broadly based extras – such as interviews or documentaries about the show or production – is not a big deal since this show is intended to be fun, disposable entertainment and not a thesis presentation.

So, if you're a fan of this show, you'll like the way they've put together this package. And if you're not a fan, well, all we can say is get ready for the new season of Heroes and make sure you have your annotated Necronomicon handy."

— Scott Harris, UGO.com

The season's DVD release has received generally positive reviews from television critics. Scott Harris of UGO.com gave the box set a positive review, stating that the show translated "pretty well" to DVD. He praised the ability to "sit down and view an episode here or there whenever you want without making a giant production out of it". Harris also liked the set's special features, stating that they allowed viewers to "[turn] each episode into a giant production" and praised the inclusion of the special features on the discs alongside their respective episodes, instead of placing them on another disc. He summed up his review by stating that "it's a pretty neat little package when taken on an episode-by-episode basis" and that fans of the show would enjoy the release. Harris rated three aspects of the release; he gave the look a B−, the sound a B, and the extras an A−.

In his review for MovieFreak.com, critic Richard Scott presented a mixed-to-generally positive review of the set. Scott was positive about the audio and video, but presented a mixed view towards the extras. He enjoyed the commentaries, saying that they are "more chatty than informative, but everyone is relaxed, and the result is entertaining and fun", but was not favorable about the international pilot. Scott was generally mixed towards the deleted scenes and character profiles, but liked the blooper reel and called it "better than most". He gave the video and audio an eight of ten, and the extras a seven. Scott presented an overall rating of "Recommended" to the release. Reviewing the show and release for WF DVD Report, Zach Demeter presented a generally positive review. He praised the set's audio and video, calling them "absolutely awesome" and being better than the show's original broadcast. He stated that the set has "cool packaging" but that it is "just a bit on the strange side". Demeter also praised the set's special features, but was disappointed by the short length of the blooper reel and other things like the full screen release of the features. He liked the commentaries and deleted scenes, but was mixed in his opinion on the international pilot. Overall, Demeter stated that it "comes with a high level of re-play value even after already knowing how the stories end" and gave the box set a rating of "Highly Recommended".

Psych, The Complete First Season
Set Details			Special Features
15 episodes; 4-disc set; 1.78:1 aspect ratio; Languages: English (Dolby Digital 5.1 Surround, with subtitles)			Optional audio commentaries for "Pilot", "Spellingg Bee", "9 Lives", "Weekend Warriors", "From the Earth to the Starbucks", and "Scary Sherry: Bianca's Toast"; Deleted scenes for most episodes; Audition tapes; Inside the Writer's Room featurette; Character Profiles; Blooper Reals for some episodes; Behind-the-Scenes Featurettes; Psych Revealed; International version of the Pilot episode
Release Dates			Optional audio commentaries for "Pilot", "Spellingg Bee", "9 Lives", "Weekend Warriors", "From the Earth to the Starbucks", and "Scary Sherry: Bianca's Toast"; Deleted scenes for most episodes; Audition tapes; Inside the Writer's Room featurette; Character Profiles; Blooper Reals for some episodes; Behind-the-Scenes Featurettes; Psych Revealed; International version of the Pilot episode
Region 1	Region 2	Region 4	Optional audio commentaries for "Pilot", "Spellingg Bee", "9 Lives", "Weekend Warriors", "From the Earth to the Starbucks", and "Scary Sherry: Bianca's Toast"; Deleted scenes for most episodes; Audition tapes; Inside the Writer's Room featurette; Character Profiles; Blooper Reals for some episodes; Behind-the-Scenes Featurettes; Psych Revealed; International version of the Pilot episode
June 26, 2007	January 9, 2008	April 30, 2008	Optional audio commentaries for "Pilot", "Spellingg Bee", "9 Lives", "Weekend Warriors", "From the Earth to the Starbucks", and "Scary Sherry: Bianca's Toast"; Deleted scenes for most episodes; Audition tapes; Inside the Writer's Room featurette; Character Profiles; Blooper Reals for some episodes; Behind-the-Scenes Featurettes; Psych Revealed; International version of the Pilot episode
