= Who Ya Gonna Call? =

- Psych episode
- Episode no.: Season 1 Episode 7
- Directed by: Michael Lange
- Written by: Kerry Lenhart & Jack Sakmar
- Production code: 1005
- Original air date: August 18, 2006
- Running time: 43 minutes

Guest appearances
- Kirsten Nelson as Chief Karen Vick; Sage Brocklebank as Officer Buzz McNab; Liam James as Young Shawn; Frank Whaley as Robert/Regina/Martin; Nico McEown as Young Bully; Tracy Trueman as Amy

Episode chronology
← Previous "Weekend Warriors"	Next → "Shawn vs. the Red Phantom"
- Psych season 1

"Who Ya Gonna Call?" is the seventh episode of the first season of the American comedy-drama television series Psych. It was written by co-executive producers Jack Sakmar and Kerry Lenhart, and was directed by Michael Lange. The episode originally aired on USA Network in the United States on August 18, 2006. The installment features guest appearances by Kirsten Nelson, Sage Brocklebank, Frank Whaley, and Nico McEown among others. The title refers to the song Ghostbusters, written and performed by Ray Parker Jr.

The series follows Shawn Spencer (James Roday) and his colleague and best friend Burton "Gus" Guster (Dulé Hill), who claim to operate a psychic detective agency; it is actually based on Shawn's hyperobservant ability. In the episode, an obviously disturbed man requests help from the two, believing that he is being haunted. Upon investigation, they decide it is actually the man's ex-girlfriend but find she is engaged and could not be the "ghost". After an attempt on their lives, Shawn and Gus look through the man's house again, finding a room full of women's belongings, where Shawn realizes the man has dissociative identity disorder and is the perpetrator of a murder spree. They rush to where they think the man is and prevent one of his other personalities from murdering a doctor.

"Who Ya Gonna Call?" received generally positive reviews from critics. At the time of its broadcast, the installment was considered to be one of the best episodes of the first season. According to Nielsen Media Research, the episode was watched by approximately 4.80 million viewers during its original broadcast and received a 1.5/4 share in the 18-49 demographic.

== Plot ==
In a flashback to 1986, young Shawn Spencer (Liam James) runs to his house, pursued by a bully (Nico McEown). After explaining the situation to his father, Henry (Corbin Bernsen), Shawn is forced to go outside and talk to the bully. Henry hides within his lecture that Shawn cannot run from his fears forever. In the present, Shawn (James Roday) and his partner Burton "Gus" Guster (Dulé Hill) arrive at the office of Dr. Blinn, a psychiatrist who has been killed by a blow to the head. Detective Carlton Lassiter (Timothy Omundson) throws them out of the crime scene shortly after they arrive, but not before Shawn is able to gather several details from the area. Back at the Psych office, Robert Dunn (Frank Whaley) asks the two to help him, believing that he is being haunted by ghosts. Agreeing to assist him, they go to his house, where Shawn finds evidence pointing to Dunn's ex-girlfriend. Staying the night, they wake up to find the house on fire. During that time, Detective Lassiter and Juliet O'Hara (Maggie Lawson) have been trying to track down a "Regina Kane", believing her to be the murderer.

The fire having done only moderate damage, Shawn and Gus leave, visiting Lassiter and O'Hara before driving to talk with Dunn's ex-girlfriend. Her alibi checks out, and Shawn gains another lead. While returning from the woman's house, Shawn and Gus's car is nearly rammed off the road, the driver fleeing after the attempt. Shawn notices several details, and comes up with an idea for who Dunn's ghost is. Returning to Robert's house, they search most of the house for him. Instead of finding him, they discover a secret room in the attic, which is filled with women's clothing and accessories. Shawn realizes that Robert is "Regina Kane", and that he unknowingly has dissociative identity disorder. They find Robert, and trigger his "Regina" personality, but it turns out not to be violent. They decide that there has to be a third personality, a violent one. Remembering what the ex-girlfriend had said, Shawn realizes afterwards that it is "Martin Brody", who is likely the person who tried to take them out. Remembering that "Regina" scheduled a meeting with another doctor to discuss gender reassignment, Shawn and Gus alert the police and rush to the doctor's office, stopping "Martin" right before he kills the doctor.

== Production ==
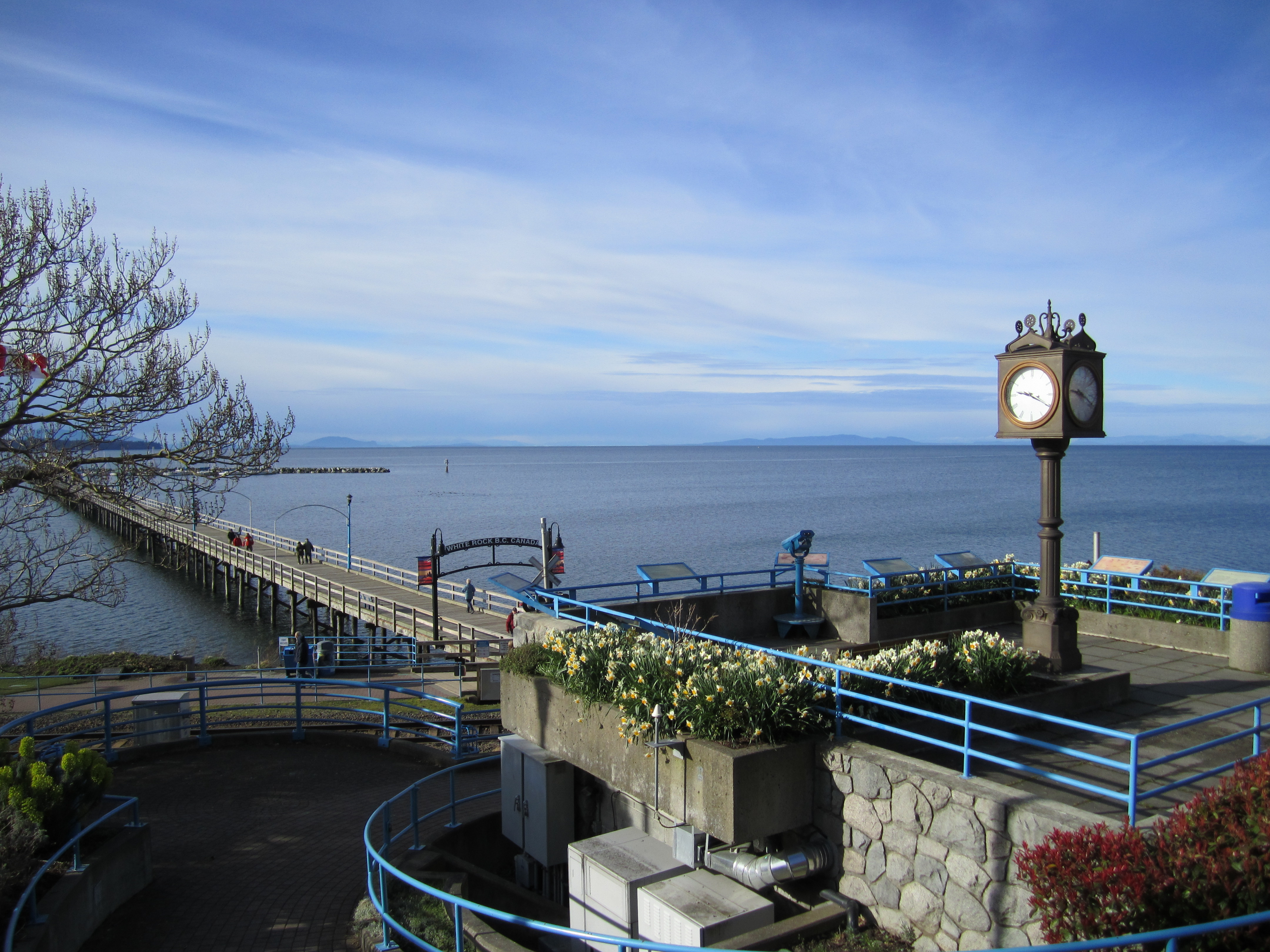
White Rock, British Columbia, where the majority of Psych episodes are filmed

"Who Ya Gonna Call?" was the only episode directed by Michael Lange. The episode was the first installment written by co-executive producers Kerry Lenhart and John J. Sakmar, who later collaborated with Douglas Steinberg to write the season's fourteenth episode, "Poker? I Barely Know Her". Tracey Jeffery was the episode's producer, John J. Sakmar and Jerry Lenhart were the consulting producers, and Mel Damski, Steve Franks, Kelly Kulchak, and Chris Henze were the associate producers. Erin Smith was the production manager. Tracy Hillman was the installment's associate producer, and Michael McMurray was the director of photography, while Allan Lee and Anupam Nigam acted as the editors. David Crabtree, James Ilecic, Allan Lee, and Gordon Rempel were the script editors. The music for the episode was written by Adam Cohen and John Robert Wood. Assistant directors for the installment were Jack Hardy and Roger Russell.

Although meant to take place in Santa Barbara, California, the installment, like the majority of Psych's episodes, was filmed in and around the Vancouver area of British Columbia. According to the show's creator Steve Franks, about half of the scenes in each episode are filmed in the suburb town of White Rock. Several of the sets, like the Psych office and Henry Spencer's house, are located along the coast in the White Rock area. Because of the differences between Vancouver and Santa Barbara, the show's producers were forced to bring in props for each episode, such as nine fake palm trees which had to be trucked to the set every day. The scripts for each Psych episode had to go through several reviews, and often were cut down by as many as one hundred pages. A large portion of show's dialogue consists of on-the-spot improvisation by the actors, specifically Roday and Hill. The writers noted that much of the humor in the installments came from improvisation. The episode also included several reoccurring gags on the show, such as an introductory flashback and the inclusion of a pineapple; both gags were created by the action of one of the actors.

The installment featured several guest stars. Kirsten Nelson, Sage Brocklebank, and Liam James all reprised their roles as the reoccurring characters police chief Karen Vick, officer Buzz McNab, and Young Shawn Spencer, respectively. Nico McEown played the young bully in the flashback introduction, Tracy Trueman played Robert Dunn's ex-girlfriend Amy, and John Dadey acted as the murdered Dr. Blinn. The episode's main guest star was Frank Whaley, who played Robert/Regina/Martin. Whaley had been an actor on NCIS and The Dead Zone before his role on the episode, and was described as an actor who fades into the background.

=== Release ===
The episode was originally broadcast in the United States on August 8, 2006, on USA Network as the seventh episode of the show's first season. It aired at a 10:00 P.M. EST/PST time slot, following a new episode of the show Monk. The episode aired under a rating of TV-PG, meaning that some of its content may not be appropriate for young children. The show's following installment, "Shawn vs. The Red Phantom", was the final episode to air in 2006; the show took a mid-season break, and returned in January 2007. "Who Ya Gonna Call?" runs for approximately 43 minutes, the average length for a Psych episode.

"Who Ya Gonna Call?", along with the fourteen other episodes from Psych's first season were released on a four-disc DVD set in the United States and Canada on June 26, 2007. The set includes full audio commentaries for six episodes, deleted scenes for most episodes, blooper reals, audition tapes, character profiles, the international version of the episode "Pilot", an "Inside the writers' room" featurette, and other special features. The set is filmed in 1.78:1 aspect ratio, with English subtitles available, and Dolby Digital 5.1 Surround. The DVD set was released in the United Kingdom and other Region 2 countries on January 9, 2008, and was released in Australia on April 30 of the same year. The entire first season has also been released on the iTunes store for digital download, as well as independent downloads of each individual episode.

== Reception ==
According to Nielsen Media Research, "Who Ya Gonna Call?" was viewed by approximately 4.80 million people in its original American broadcast. The episode earned a 1.5 rating/4 share in the 18–49 demographic, meaning that on average 1.5 percent of all television-equipped households were tuned into the installment at any given moment, while 4 percent of households watching TV were tuned into it during the time slot. The installment was the sixth most watched cable program on its air date, falling behind its lead-in, Monk, which was seen by about 5.6 million people and placed fourth. The episode's ratings were a slight improvement from the previous episode, "Weekend Warriors", which was viewed by 4.76 million people, and was also better than the following episode, which was viewed by approximately 4.6 million people.

Since airing, the episode has received generally positive reviews from critics. In his review for IGN, contributor Colin Moriarty stated that the episode was "as strong as we've come to expect in recent weeks" and called it "undeniably fun to watch and has the ability to get a laugh out of you even if you're in the worst of moods". Moriarty praised the chemistry that was developing between the actors, and hoped that "all of the characters will get more involved to really see where they are all going". He hoped that the show "ends on the high note it's been reaching towards rather than heading towards a decrescendo that hurts many a promising show" and added that "in the meantime, check out this episode for a good laugh, and wait patiently for the culmination of the first season". Overall, the installment was given a rating of 8, or "great", tying it for the best rated episode of the show at the time of the review; it was rated as being equal to the preceding episode, "Weekend Warriors".

In his review for TV Squad, writer Richard Keller presented a favorable view toward the episode, beginning by pointing out how the episode put " a little twist on who committed the crime". Keller liked how Gus seemed to take a more dominant role, pointing out the Dulé Hill "continued to grow into his character" and "seemed to have a bit more confidence". He presented mixed feelings towards Roday's performance, calling it "fine as usual, but not as laugh out-loud funny". Keller liked the performances of Omundson and Lawson, but criticized the wardrobe for Lawson's character, pointing out that "she wears the same pants suit" and hoped that "she can mix it up a bit once in awhile".
