= Joshua Sasse =

British actor (born 1987)

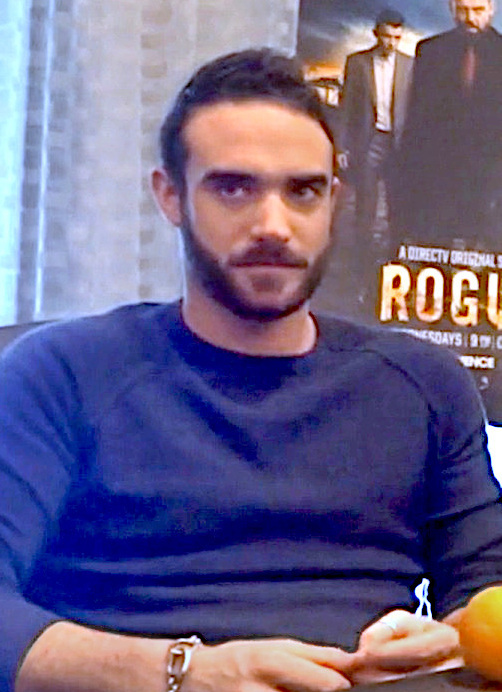
- Sasse in 2013
- Born: 9 December 1987 (age 38); Westminster, London
- Occupation: Actor
- Years active: 2010–2017; 2021–present
- Spouse: Louisa Ainsworth (m. 2018; sep. 2025)
- Children: 3

Joshua Seymour Sasse (/sæs/ SASS) (born 9 December 1987) is an English actor. On television, he is known for his roles in the police procedural Rogue (2013–2014), the ABC series Galavant (2015-2016) as the titular character, the CW series No Tomorrow (2016–2017), the Fox series Monarch (2022) and the U&Drama series Outrageous (2025). His films include The Big I Am (2010), Frankenstein's Army (2012) and Love Is in the Air (2023).

== Early life ==
Sasse was born 9 December 1987 in Westminster, London to poet Dominic Sasse and Mary Rosalind Macauley, a granddaughter of British peer and publisher William Berry, 1st Viscount Camrose. He was raised Roman Catholic and has Irish, Welsh, Scottish, Indian and Jewish ancestry.

When he was four, Sasse lost his father. After his mother remarried, he and his older sister grew up in Ludlow, Shropshire and then Aymestrey, Herefordshire. Sasse attended Shrewsbury School and then Hurtwood House boarding school in Surrey for sixth form. After leaving Hurtwood, he studied at Cygnet Training Theatre in Exeter.

== Career ==
His first major role was on the British gangster film The Big I Am in 2010. That same year, Sasse took over the role of Sky in the West End production of Mamma Mia! at the Prince of Wales Theatre.

In March 2012, Sasse was cast in the horror film Frankenstein's Army. In April 2013, he was cast in the Movie Network police series Rogue. He had a recurring role on the show which lasted for two series and 13 episodes.

In December 2013, he was cast in Dan Fogelman's fairy tale-themed musical comedy pilot Galavant. The pilot was shot in London due to the UK's new tax credit for high-end television shows. He was also cast in a recurring role on Fogelman's award-winning comedy The Neighbors as DJ Jazzy Jeff.

In May 2014, Galavant was picked to series and premiered on 4 January 2015. The second season premiered on 3 January 2016.

In 2016, he was selected to co-star in The CW's series No Tomorrow.

In 2021, he was cast in Her Pen Pal alongside former Galavant co-star Mallory Jansen.

In 2025, Sasse founded The Darling Theatre Company in Byron, Australia offering a range of training opportunities for actors, including camera workshops, audition surgeries and one on one coaching.

Sasse also wrote and directed the original stage play Thrust Issues, in which he is set to portray the character Valerian. The play premieres in August 2026 and centres on a book club whose members become captivated by a steamy fantasy novel, exploring themes of friendship, marriage, loneliness and hidden desires.

== Personal life ==
Sasse was engaged to Australian singer Kylie Minogue from February 2016 to 2017.

Sasse was married to Louisa Ainsworth from 2018 to 2025. They have two children, Dominic and Delilah. Sasse also has a child from a previous relationship.

== Filmography ==
=== Film ===
Year	Title	Role	Notes
2010	The Big I Am	Rixie	
2012	Frankenstein's Army	Sergei	
2021	Her Pen Pal	Jacques	Hallmark Movie
2023	Love Is in the Air	William Mitchell	Netflix
2023	One Perfect Match	Finn Grayson	Great American Family

=== Television ===
Year	Title	Role	Notes
2013–2014	Rogue	Alec Laszlo	13 episodes
2014	The Neighbors	DJ Jazzy Jeff	3 episodes
2015–2016	Galavant	Galavant	Main role
2016–2017	No Tomorrow	Xavier	Main role
2022	Monarch	Luke Roman	Main role
2024	Outrageous	Sir Oswald Mosley	
