= Madame Hydra =

- Marvel Comics character
- First appearance: Comic: Captain America #110 (1969); Film: Nick Fury: Agent of S.H.I.E.L.D. (1998); Television: X-Men: Evolution (2000)
- First game: Captain America: Super Soldier(2011)
- Created by: Jim Steranko
- Portrayed by: Lisa Ann Beley, Vanessa Marshall, Audrey Wasilewski, Tasia Valenza, Kari Wahlgren, Vanessa Marshall, Nicolette Reed
- Motion capture: Lisa Rinna, Sandra Hess, Mallory Jansen, Julia Louis-Dreyfus

In-story information
- Title: Madame Hydra
- Occupation: Top female operative of Hydra
- Affiliation: Hydra

Madame Hydra is the name of several supervillains appearing in American comic books published by Marvel Comics. It is a name given to a top female operative of Hydra.

== Fictional character biography ==
=== Elisa Sinclair ===
Elisa Sinclair originates from an alternative timeline created by Kobik where Steve Rogers (Captain America) was captured by Hydra as a child and made into a sleeper agent for Hydra. In the present, Sinclair intercepts Taskmaster and Black Ant, who intended to give evidence of Captain America's brainwashing to Maria Hill. Sinclair recruits Taskmaster and Black Ant as her personal guards.

In the storyline Secret Empire, Sinclair reunites with Captain America after he overthrows the Red Skull for leadership of Hydra. Following Hydra's takeover of the United States, Sinclair uses her magic to counter Doctor Strange's attempts to destroy the Darkforce dome surrounding Manhattan. While having tea with Captain America, Sinclair is informed of Captain America's suspicion about Baron Zemo and Doctor Faustus' disloyalty. Sinclair brushes off the suspicion and tells Captain America that Hydra plans to assemble the Cosmic Cube to restore Earth to their vision. During Hydra's attack on the Underground's base, Sinclair sacrifices herself to save Captain America.

== Other versions ==
=== Heroes Reborn ===
In the Heroes Reborn reality, Madame Hydra is a terrorist leader. She answers to Hydra's leader the Mandarin, who is actually a robot built by Doctor Doom. She is killed in battle against Iron Man.

== In other media ==
=== Television ===
- The Viper incarnation of Madame Hydra appears in X-Men: Evolution, voiced by Lisa Ann Beley.
- The Viper incarnation of Madame Hydra appears in The Avengers: Earth's Mightiest Heroes, voiced by Vanessa Marshall.

=== Film ===
Valentina Allegra de Fontaine and Viper appear in Nick Fury: Agent of S.H.I.E.L.D., portrayed by Lisa Rinna and Sandra Hess respectively.

=== Marvel Cinematic Universe ===
Mallory Jansen as Madame Hydra, as depicted in Agents of S.H.I.E.L.D.

Variations of individuals who have used the Madame Hydra alias in the comics appear in media set in the Marvel Cinematic Universe (MCU):

- A variation of Ophelia / Madame Hydra appears in the fourth season of the television series Agents of S.H.I.E.L.D. as an alias for the AI Aida, portrayed by Mallory Jansen. Aida only has the title of Madame Hydra in the Framework, while she chose the name Ophelia due to disliking her acronym name.
- Valentina Allegra de Fontaine appears in the Disney+ miniseries The Falcon and the Winter Soldier and the films Black Widow, Black Panther: Wakanda Forever, and Thunderbolts* portrayed by Julia Louis-Dreyfus. This version is unconnected to Hydra.

=== Video games ===
- Madame Hydra appears as a boss in Captain America: Super Soldier, voiced by Audrey Wasilewski.
- Viper appears as the first boss in Marvel: Avengers Alliance.
- Viper appears as a boss in Marvel: Avengers Alliance Tactics.
- Madame Hydra appears in Marvel Heroes, voiced by Tasia Valenza.
- Viper appears in Lego Marvel Super Heroes, voiced by Kari Wahlgren.
- Viper appears in Lego Marvel's Avengers.
- Madame Hydra appears as a boss in Marvel Avengers Academy.
- The Viper incarnation of Madame Hydra appears in Marvel Powers United VR, voiced again by Vanessa Marshall.

=== Miscellaneous ===
- The Viper incarnation of Madame Hydra appears in the Spider-Woman: Agent of S.W.O.R.D. motion comic, voiced by Nicolette Reed.
- Madame Hydra appears in Marvel Universe Live!.

=== Merchandise ===
An action figure of the Viper incarnation of Madame Hydra was released in Hasbro's "Marvel Legends" line as part of the "Marvel's Madames" sub-line.
