= Galavant =

American television series

- Genre: Fantasy comedy; Musical
- Created by: Dan Fogelman
- Starring: Joshua Sasse; Timothy Omundson; Vinnie Jones; Mallory Jansen; Karen David; Luke Youngblood
- Narrated by: Ben Presley
- Theme music composer: Alan Menken
- Composers: Alan Menken; Christopher Lennertz; Glenn Slater
- Country of origin: United States
- Original language: English
- No. of seasons: 2
- No. of episodes: 18

Production
- Executive producers: Dan Fogelman; Alan Menken; Glenn Slater; Chris Koch; Kat Likkel; John Hoberg; John Fortenberry; David Windsor
- Producers: Marshall Boone; Helen Flint
- Production location: United Kingdom
- Cinematography: Chris Seager; Ashley Rowe
- Editors: David L. Bertman; Lance Luckey
- Camera setup: Single-camera
- Running time: 22 minutes
- Production companies: Rhode Island Ave. Productions; ABC Studios

Original release
- Network: ABC
- Release: January 4, 2015 – January 31, 2016

Galavant is an American musical fantasy comedy television series, created and written by Dan Fogelman, with music and lyrics by Alan Menken and Glenn Slater. Fogelman, Menken and Slater also serve as executive producers alongside Chris Koch, Kat Likkel and John Hoberg. Joshua Sasse stars as the titular character, and is joined by principal cast members Timothy Omundson, Vinnie Jones, Mallory Jansen, Karen David, and Luke Youngblood. Jansen described Galavant as "the bastard child of Monty Python and The Princess Bride."

The series premiered on January 4, 2015, with its first season consisting of eight episodes which aired over four weeks. The series was renewed for a second season of ten episodes on May 7, 2015, which premiered on January 3, 2016, following the same airing scheme as the first season. On May 12, 2016, the series was canceled after two seasons.

== Plot ==
Galavant is a dashing knight, down on his luck, determined to reclaim his reputation and his "happily ever after" by going after the evil King Richard, who ruined it the moment he kidnapped the love of Galavant's life, Madalena, who then decided to stay with Richard for his money and power. Galavant is assisted by his faithful squire, Sid, and the lovely Princess Isabella, whose kingdom of Valencia has been conquered by Richard. Meanwhile, the malevolent but weak-willed Richard tries to win over the scheming Madalena and seeks help from his brawny henchman, Gareth, and his chef, Vincenzo. The episodes chronicle Galavant's journeys (and the twists and turns that go along with them) through musical numbers composed and written by Menken and Slater. They participate in a joust, visit Sid's hometown, are captured by shipwrecked pirates, and make a stop with a band of singing monks before finally being captured by Richard and Gareth as they try to infiltrate the castle to rescue Madalena, who, it turns out, doesn't want or need to be rescued as Isabella had told the group. Richard is knocked off the throne when his older brother, Kingsley, shows up and claims it, and everyone finds themselves locked in the dungeon together. Richard's brother orders the captives executed. Gareth refuses and sets them all free but Sid, but before the new king can retaliate he is stabbed in the back and Madalena puts Gareth on the throne of Valencia beside her. Isabella and crew seek shelter with her cousin Harry in Hortensia, where she is locked away until they can marry, and Richard and Galavant (who, it turns out, is more than a little fickle) set sail with the pirates to rescue her.

In the second season, Richard attempts to find a new role for himself in life, and he falls in love with Roberta Steinglass, a childhood friend. Galavant goes to great lengths to recruit an army to help him on his quest. Richard also adopts a lizard, believing it will grow into a dragon and draws a sword that he does not know can only be drawn by the "one true king to unite them all." At the same time, Chester Wormwood, an evil sorcerer who doubles as a wedding planner, has taken control of Isabella's mind so she is now accepting being married to her cousin. When his plan eventually backfires, Isabella exiles him, and he flees to Valencia, where he encourages Gareth and Madalena to start an unplanned war with Hortensia. Wormwood also offers to teach them his "Dark Dark Evil Way" (abbreviated as D'DEW) of sorcery, which Gareth rejects but Madalena secretly accepts. All the episodes lead up to the finale, a huge battle between three armies, including the Valencians, the Hortensians, and a swarm of zombies led by Galavant and Richard.

== Cast and characters ==
=== Main ===
- Joshua Sasse as Sir Gary Galavant
- Timothy Omundson as King Richard
- Vinnie Jones as Gareth
- Mallory Jansen as Queen Madalena
- Karen David as Princess Isabella "Izzy" Maria Lucia Elizabetta of Valencia
- Luke Youngblood as Sidney "Sid"

=== Recurring ===
- Ben Presley as Steve Mackenzie the Jester. Briefly Madalena's lover, who later becomes Isabella's confidant. He also serves as the series' occasional narrator.
- Darren Evans as Vincenzo, the royal chef of Valencia and Gwynne's love interest.
- Sophie McShera as Gwynne, Madalena's maidservant and Chef Vincenzo's love interest.
- Stanley Townsend as the King of Valencia, Isabella's father.
- Genevieve Allenbury as the Queen of Valencia, Isabella's mother.
- Hugh Bonneville as Peter Pillager, the Pirate King
- "Weird Al" Yankovic as the Head Monk, leader of a group of monks who have taken a vow of singing.
- Rutger Hauer as Kingsley (season 1), Richard's older brother.
- Kemaal Deen-Ellis as Prince Harry of Hortensia, Isabella's eleven-year-old cousin and fiancé.
- Robert Lindsay as Chester Wormwood (season 2), an evil sorcerer and occasional wedding planner who follows the Dark Dark Evil Way (or "D'DEW").
- Clare Foster as Roberta Steingass (season 2), Richard's childhood friend and eventual love interest.
- Muzz Khan as Barry (season 2), Wormwood's assistant.
- Alfie Simmons as Young Richard
- Sonnyboy Skelton as Young Gareth
- Anthony Head (season 1) and Greg Wise (season 2) as Arnold Galavant, Galavant's estranged father and a former knight who opened a home for troubled youth.
- John Stamos as Sir Jean Hamm, a legendary jouster and Galavant's rival.

=== Cameos ===
- Ricky Gervais as Xanax, a magician who offers psychedelic therapy sessions.
- Kylie Minogue as Queen of The Enchanted Forest, a Medieval gay bar.
- Simon Williams as Uncle Keith, who helps Galavant and Richard escape from The Enchanted Forest.
- Simon Callow as Edwin the Magnificent, a fortune teller who helps Galavant communicate with Isabella.
- Matt Lucas as Peasant John.
- Nick Frost as Andre, the leader of the "very short giants".
- Eddie Marsan as Death.

== Episodes ==
Season	Episodes	Originally released	
Season	Episodes	First released	Last released
1	8	January 4, 2015	January 25, 2015
2	10	January 3, 2016	January 31, 2016

=== Season 1 (2015) ===
No. overall	No. in season	Title	Directed by	Written by	Original release date	US viewers (millions)
1	1	"Pilot"	Chris Koch	Dan Fogelman	January 4, 2015	7.42
Madalena, the love of famous knight Galavant, is kidnapped by King Richard. Galavant tries to get her back but she decided to marry Richard anyway for the fame and fortune, crushing him. During the next year, Richard conquers the kingdom of Valencia. Madalena has started a secret affair with the Jester, and demands the Jewel of Valencia from her husband, whom she keeps comparing to Galavant to his great anger. When Richard threatens to kill the King and Queen of Valencia, their daughter, Princess Isabella, offers the gem. But instead of giving it to his ungrateful wife, he makes Isabella lure Galavant to him under the false pretense of helping her save her people, so Richard can kill Galavant and prove himself superior to Madalena. She finds Galavant an out-of-shape drunk who gave up his heroic lifestyle after his heart was broken. Seeing that Galavant has not gotten over his lost love, Isabella convinces him that Madalena still has feelings for him. The two then prepare to embark on a quest to Valencia along with Galavant's squire, Sid.
2	2	"Joust Friends"	Chris Koch	Dan Fogelman	January 4, 2015	7.42
To win money for their journey, Galavant enters a jousting tournament. He is up against his old rival Sir Jean Hamm (John Stamos). When Isabella realizes that Galavant is in terrible shape, she trains him and sabotages Hamm, to make sure that Galavant wins. King Richard asks Gareth to show him how to become more manly for Madalena.
3	3	"Two Balls"	Chris Koch	Dan Fogelman	January 11, 2015	4.11
When the party stops at Sid's hometown for a rest, they are surprised to find he was raised in a Jewish community and that he has become a legendary hero through his exaggerated stories. Sid asks Galavant to play along as his squire and Isabella as his promised wife to impress his foster parents (Faith Prince and Michael Brandon) and the townspeople. This teaches Galavant a new perspective on Sid's role as his devoted helper. After King Richard has burned the crops and the people of Valencia are starving, he organizes a ball to force them to cheer up, during which the eunuch accidentally reveals the secret affair between Madalena and the Jester.
4	4	"Comedy Gold"	John Fortenberry	Kat Likkel & John Hoberg	January 11, 2015	4.11
The party is captured and robbed by a group of stranded pirates led by the pirate King Peter the Pillager (Hugh Bonneville), an old acquaintance of Galavant. When finally everyone learns to work together, they can free their ship and sail towards Valencia. King Richard thinks he can win back Madalena by becoming as funny as the Jester, so he takes comedy lessons with him. When the Jester becomes too scared and asks Madalena to end their affair, she has him thrown into the dungeon.
5	5	"Completely Mad...Alena"	John Fortenberry	Casey Johnson & David Windsor	January 18, 2015	3.42
Richard is excited for Galavant's arrival in Valencia and plans a feast for the execution. Madalena is impatient and promises Chef Vincenzo a date with her maiden Gwynne in exchange for Richard's secrets. She finds out about Galavant's arrival and sends a letter. Galavant, Sid, and Isabella stop at a monastery of monks that have all taken a "vow of singing". Riddled by remorse, Isabella takes a confession with the lead monk (Al Yankovic) and tries to negotiate with Richard, but he wants Galavant or he will kill her parents. When the group sneaks into the castle, Richard captures them and throws them into the dungeon. Galavant learns that Isabella betrayed him, and is saved by Madalena just before the hanging.
6	6	"Dungeons and Dragon Lady"	James Griffiths	Kirker Butler	January 18, 2015	3.42
Hoping that Madalena saved him to run away and spend their lives together, Galavant has to realize that she does not want to leave her castle and fortune for him. Instead, she offers to keep him on as the Queen's boytoy when her secret plan works out. Richard is furious about Madalena, so the Chef takes him to see the famous magician Xanax (Ricky Gervais), who brings back memories of when his older brother Kingsley humiliated him. In the dungeon, Galavant and Isabella realize their love for one another. When Richard returns from Xanax, he wants to throw Madalena into the dungeon, but is stopped by Kingsley, who has returned on Madalena's request to reclaim the throne.
7	7	"My Cousin Izzy"	Chris Koch	Scott Weinger	January 25, 2015	4.37
Kingsley challenges Richard for a duel over the throne and Madalena, but with Gareth as Kingsley's champion. Thinking about his father's (Anthony Head) lessons on being a hero, Galavant offers to fight for Richard if his friends are released when he wins. Just as the duel starts, Isabella's much younger cousin and fiance Harry arrives, who was sent for by her parents to save them. In preparation for his welcome feast, Gwynne wants Vincenzo to poison the royals so they can be free, but he only serves them food which aggravate their allergies. The Jester, Sid, and Isabella break out of the dungeon. When seeing Isabella with Galavant, Harry leaves, and the duel is on again, but this time Richard for himself against Gareth.
8	8	"It's All in the Executions"	Chris Koch	Kristin Newman	January 25, 2015	4.37
The night before the duel, Galavant and Richard bond over drinks and decide to kill Kingsley in his sleep, but they get caught and thrown into the dungeon. Gareth sneaks Galavant and Richard out of the castle to flee with the pirates. Galavant promises to take care of Richard, and in return Gareth helps the others escape, keeping Sid as a hostage. Kingsley is about to punish him, but is stabbed by Madalena, so she and Gareth seize control of Valencia. Isabella and her parents, the Jester, Vincenzo and Gwynne have fled to Hortensia where Harry locks Isabella in a giant dollhouse so he can always have an eye on her.

=== Season 2 (2016) ===
No. overall	No. in season	Title	Directed by	Written by	Original release date	US viewers (millions)
9	1	"A New Season aka Suck It Cancellation Bear"	John Fortenberry	Dan Fogelman	January 3, 2016	3.20
After everyone sings a song about how excited they are to have gotten another season for the show (with Sid accidentally spoiling the show's climax), Galavant and Richard crash land the pirate ship and make their way on foot back to Richard's kingdom. They accidentally find themselves in The Enchanted Forest, a gay bar where the Queen (Kylie Minogue) captures Galavant and forces him to tend the bar. Gareth gets no respect from Madalena but with Sid's help claims the title of king. Isabella repeatedly fails to escape from Harry and asks for help from Chef and Gwynne, and Chef agrees. Richard finds his long-lost Uncle Keith (Simon Williams) at the bar and Keith helps them to escape.
10	2	"World's Best Kiss"	John Fortenberry	Kat Likkel & John Hoberg	January 3, 2016	3.20
Isabella and Galavant share a memory of their kiss and begin to doubt it was very good. Galavant and Richard stop at a village where they meet a fortune teller (Simon Callow) who is able to communicate with Isabella via an amulet she wears. However, the amulet gets very bad reception, and it breaks up during a conversation leading Galavant to believe the kiss was wonderful, while Isabella believes that Galavant does not love her and she abandons her escape attempts. Chef also tells Richard that Gareth has betrayed him by becoming king. Gareth brings some of his possessions to be displayed, leading to an argument where Gareth and Madalena finally find mutual appreciation for each other. As Richard and Galavant leave the village, Richard unknowingly removes a magic sword from a tree stump. They then travel to his castle and find the entire building is gone.
11	3	"Aw, Hell, the King"	Declan Lowney	Kat Likkel & John Hoberg	January 10, 2016	2.41
Richard discovers his former kingdom has been converted into a democracy while he was gone using the resources of his former castle. Gareth has nightmares about betraying Richard, and Madalena forces Sid to help him. Sid makes Gareth realize he is feeling guilty over his decision. Isabella mourns her breakup and wants nothing to do with her upcoming wedding to Harry, but wedding planner/evil sorcerer Chester Wormwood has plans to take over Hortensia and deceives Isabella into wearing an enchanted tiara, putting her under his control. Galavant asks the citizens to volunteer for his army to rescue Isabella, but the only volunteer is a lady named Roberta. Galavant, Richard, and Roberta set off to find more members for their army.
12	4	"Bewitched, Bothered, and Belittled"	John Fortenberry	Maggie Bandur	January 10, 2016	2.41
Richard realizes that Roberta is a former childhood playmate of his. Galavant wants to get rid of Richard, so he tries to set them up together with a romantic dinner, which works for Roberta but not for Richard. Chef and Gwynne celebrate their new status as upper lower class citizens, but Gwynne is unable to adjust to it, and she convinces Chef to leave with her and return to their former lifestyle of abject poverty. Madalena is invited to a party by two snobby sisters (Sarah Hadland and Sally Phillips) who used to shun her when she was poor, but it really turns out to be a roast of her and she is humiliated again. On her return to Valencia, she realizes that she is feeling hurt for the first time. But when Gareth takes revenge on the sisters, she kisses him and notices another new feeling.
13	5	"Giants vs. Dwarves"	Declan Lowney	Dan Kopelman	January 17, 2016	2.32
Richard trades the Jewel of Valencia for a lizard he believes is a baby dragon, whom he names "Tad Cooper". Since he was planning on selling the Jewel to buy an army and rescue Isabella, a disgusted Galavant abandons Richard. The pair later wind up on opposite sides in a war between "very short giants" (led by Nick Frost) and "very tall dwarves", who are actually all normal-sized people, before Roberta makes peace. Isabella, who has imprisoned her own parents under Wormwood's control, visits wild Princess Jubilee (Sheridan Smith) who accidentally knocks her tiara off and frees her. Sid advises a love-sick Gareth that Madalena is a dangerous choice for a partner, but Gareth betrays his insults to Madalena, and Sid is forced to flee.
14	6	"About Last Knight"	Paul Murphy	Scott Weinger	January 17, 2016	2.32
Isabella kicks Wormwood out of Hortensia and breaks her engagement with her cousin. Madalena tries to get Gareth what he most wants for his birthday, a bar brawl, but everyone is too afraid to fight him as he is now a king. Wormwood, who has been banished from Hortensia, arrives in Valencia and convinces the royals to go to war. Galavant seeks shelter with his estranged father, Arnold (Greg Wise) and is shocked to find his emotionally distant father now runs a home for at-risk youth. When Sid reunites with Galavant, he throws him his lost sword, but accidentally impales Galavant's chest.
15	7	"Love and Death"	Paul Murphy	Robin Shorr	January 24, 2016	2.10
Richard, Sid, and Roberta bring the severely wounded Galavant to a healer, Neo of Sporin (Reece Shearsmith). Galavant dies, but Neo makes a potion allowing Galvant to defeat Death (Eddie Marsan) and return to life. Neo then provides Galavant with an army of zombies. Wormwood plans for war with Madalena and Gareth, who realize they may be falling in love. Isabella readies Hortensia for war but finds they have no weapons. Richard and Roberta admit they have feelings for each other.
16	8	"Do the D'DEW"	Chris Koch	Jeremy Hall	January 24, 2016	2.10
Roberta and Richard finally make love, and Richard loses his virginity. Isabella meets with Gareth and Madalena to discuss terms of surrender but Isabella leaves more determined to defeat them. Wormwood offers to teach them his "dark dark evil way" (abbreviated as D'DEW) of magic, which Gareth refuses but Madalena secretly accepts. Galavant has troubles controlling the zombies until he realizes they respond positively to his idea of fighting for love. Sid leaves to redeem himself since he feels guilty for briefly killing Galavant, and Roberta, believing Richard will be killed in battle, refuses to watch him die and breaks things off. All three armies prepare for battle.
17	9	"Battle of the Three Armies"	John Fortenberry	Rick Wiener & Kenny Schwartz	January 31, 2016	2.15
The armies of Valencia, Hortensia, and the undead clash, right on top of Chef and Gwynne's hovel. Gareth, angry at Madalena's use of the dark arts, defects and makes peace with Richard. Galavant and Isabella reunite on the battlefield and plan to marry if they survive. Wormwood uses his magic to turn the zombies against everyone. The heroes retreat into the castle. Madalena tries to persuade Gareth to leave with her. When he refuses, she releases the undead army.
18	10	"The One True King (To Unite Them All)"	John Fortenberry	Rick Wiener & Kenny Schwartz	January 31, 2016	2.15
Richard reflects on his unhappy childhood. Sid returns with an army consisting of minor characters, turning the tide of the battle. Isabella and Madalena fight face to face, with Isabella emerging victorious. Richard faces Wormwood, who seems to kill Tad Cooper, the lizard Richard believes is a dragon. Enraged, Richard strikes down Wormwood with his magical sword, revealing himself to be the true king of the Seven Realms. Gareth tries to make up with Madalena, but she has tasted the ultimate power and wants more; she magically vanishes. Richard catches up with Roberta before she leaves the kingdom and confesses his love. In the final song, everyone is seen getting their happy ending: Galavant and Isabella marry in a ceremony backed by the Singing Monks (once again led by "Weird Al" Yankovic) and retire to a house by the sea. Isabella's parents return to Valencia and reclaim the throne. Chef and Gwynne rebuild their house. Gareth invites Sid on a quest to "save Madalena from herself", finally giving Sid an adventure of his own. Madalena arrives at a spooky castle to meet with the Dark Evil Lord (abbreviated as DEL) to master her powers of D'DEW. Richard, who has settled down with Roberta, feeds Tad Cooper, who has grown into an actual fire-breathing dragon.

== Production ==
=== Development ===
The series reunites screenwriter Dan Fogelman, composer Alan Menken, and lyricist Glenn Slater, who had worked together on the 2010 animated film Tangled (produced by ABC's corporate sibling Walt Disney Animation Studios). The pilot was ordered by ABC in October 2013, and picked up to series in May 2014.

=== Filming ===
Principal photography took place in the Bottle Yard Studios in Bristol, United Kingdom. Peter the Pillager's pirate ship in season one is filmed on the life-size reproduction of the Matthew which lives in Bristol's Floating Harbour.

Other filming locations include Caldicot Castle and Caerphilly Castle in Wales, Southern Down on the Bristol Channel, Berkeley Castle, Cosmeston Medieval Village, and Wells Cathedral.

=== Release ===
The series premiered on January 4, 2015, taking over the timeslot of fellow ABC series Once Upon a Time for the mid-season period. It was billed as a four-week "comedy extravaganza".

On May 7, 2015, the series was renewed for a 10-episode second season. The title of the second-season premiere, "A New Season aka Suck It Cancellation Bear", mocks the predicted cancellation by the ratings website TV by the Numbers after the first season.

The series was cancelled on May 12, 2016. Upon cancellation, composer Menken expressed interest in continuing the series on stage.

=== Music ===
Galavant is a comedy musical. The incidental music is composed by Menken and Christopher Lennertz. The songs are composed by Menken with lyrics by Slater, and have been described as "self-knowing parodies", both on Menken and Slater's previous work, as well as on classic musicals such as West Side Story. According to Fogelman, the lyrics of the opening song of the second season makes fun of the "eventization" of every limited-run series. They also comment on the shows' broadcast time slot and the missed Emmy nomination.

The following songs featured on Galavant are performed by the Galavant cast.

==== Season 1 (2015) ====
No.	Episode	Song names
1	"Pilot"	"Galavant"
1	"Pilot"	"Galavant Rides"
1	"Pilot"	"Galavant (Isabella Reprise)"
1	"Pilot"	"She'll Be Mine"
1	"Pilot"	"Galavant Wrap-Up"
2	"Joust Friends"	"Hero's Journey"
2	"Joust Friends"	"Stand Up"
2	"Joust Friends"	"Maybe You're Not the Worst Thing Ever"
3	"Two Balls"	"Previously On Galavant"
3	"Two Balls"	"Oy! What a Knight"
3	"Two Balls"	"Jackass in a Can"
3	"Two Balls"	"Dance Until You Die"
4	"Comedy Gold"	"Togetherness"
4	"Comedy Gold"	"Lords of the Sea"
4	"Comedy Gold"	"Comedy Gold"
4	"Comedy Gold"	"Togetherness (Reprise)"
5	"Completely Mad...Alena"	"Galavant Gallivants"
5	"Completely Mad...Alena"	"No One But You"
5	"Completely Mad...Alena"	"Hey, Hey, We're the Monks"
5	"Completely Mad...Alena"	"Hey, Hey, We're the Monks (Reprise)"
5	"Completely Mad...Alena"	"If I Could Share My Life With You"
6	"Dungeons and Dragon Lady"	"I Love You (As Much As Someone Like Me Can Love Anyone)"
6	"Dungeons and Dragon Lady"	"A Day in Richard's Life"
6	"Dungeons and Dragon Lady"	"Love Is Strange"
7	"My Cousin Izzy"	"Moment in the Sun #1"
7	"My Cousin Izzy"	"Moment in the Sun #2"
7	"My Cousin Izzy"	"A Happy Ending For Us"
7	"My Cousin Izzy"	"Moment in the Sun #3"
7	"My Cousin Izzy"	"Moment in the Sun #4"
7	"My Cousin Izzy"	"Moment in the Sun #5"
8	"It's All in the Executions"	"Galavant Finale"
8	"It's All in the Executions"	"Goodnight My Friend (Short)"
8	"It's All in the Executions"	"Secret Mission"
8	"It's All in the Executions"	"Goodnight My Friend"
8	"It's All in the Executions"	"Goodnight My Friend (Reprise)"

An official soundtrack for the first season was released on January 19, 2015.

No.	Title	Performers	Length
1.	"Galavant"	Ben Presley and the Cast of Galavant	2:21
2.	"She'll Be Mine"	Timothy Omundson, Vinnie Jones, and the Cast of Galavant	2:11
3.	"Maybe You're Not the Worst Thing Ever"	Timothy Omundson, Mallory Jansen, Karen David, and Joshua Sasse	1:42
4.	"Oy! What a Knight"	Faith Prince, Michael Brandon, Luke Youngblood, Karen David, and the Cast of Galavant	1:52
5.	"Jackass in a Can"	Joshua Sasse and the Cast of Galavant	1:44
6.	"Togetherness"	Joshua Sasse, Luke Youngblood, and Karen David	2:23
7.	"Comedy Gold"	Ben Presley and Timothy Omundson	2:21
8.	"Lords of the Sea (feat.Hugh Bonneville)"	Cast of Galavant	1:46
9.	"No One But You"	Mallory Jansen	2:00
10.	"Hey, Hey, We're the Monks (feat. "Weird Al" Yankovic)"	Cast of Galavant	1:16
11.	"If I Could Share My Life With You"	Darren Evans and Sophie McShera	2:20
12.	"A Day in Richard's Life (feat. Ricky Gervais)"	Cast of Galavant	2:47
13.	"Love Is Strange"	Karen David and Joshua Sasse	1:43
14.	"Goodnight My Friend"	Timothy Omundson	2:20

==== Season 2 (2016) ====
No.	Episode	Song names
1	"A New Season aka Suck It Cancellation Bear"	"A New Season"
1	"A New Season aka Suck It Cancellation Bear"	"Off With His Shirt"
1	"A New Season aka Suck It Cancellation Bear"	"A New Season (Reprise)"
2	"World's Best Kiss"	"World's Best Kiss"
2	"World's Best Kiss"	"Let's Agree to Disagree"
2	"World's Best Kiss"	"World's Best Kiss (Reprise)"
3	"Aw, Hell, the King"	"Build a New Tomorrow"
3	"Aw, Hell, the King"	"If I Were a Jolly Blacksmith"
3	"Aw, Hell, the King"	"The Happiest Day of Your Life"
4	"Bewitched, Bothered and Belittled"	"As Good as it Gets"
4	"Bewitched, Bothered and Belittled"	"Serenade (Maybe You Won't Die Alone)"
4	"Bewitched, Bothered and Belittled"	"What Am I Feeling"
5	"Giants vs. Dwarves"	"My Dragon Pal and Me"
5	"Giants vs. Dwarves"	"Different Kind of Princess"
5	"Giants vs. Dwarves"	"Dwarves Vs Giants"
5	"Giants vs. Dwarves"	"My Dragon Pal and Me (Reprise)"
6	"About Last Knight"	"Today We Rise"
6	"About Last Knight"	"He Was There"
6	"About Last Knight"	"He Was There (Reprise)"
7	"Love and Death"	"Time is of the Essence"
7	"Love and Death"	"Love Makes the World Brand New"
7	"Love and Death"	"Goodbye"
8	"Do the D'DEW"	"I Don't Like You"
8	"Do the D'DEW"	"Finally"
8	"Do the D'DEW"	"A Dark Season"
9	"Battle of the Three Armies"	"Galavant Recap"
9	"Battle of the Three Armies"	"A Good Day to Die"
9	"Battle of the Three Armies"	"Do the D'Dew"
9	"Battle of the Three Armies"	"A Good Day to Die (Reprise)"
10	"The One True King (To Unite Them All)"	"Will My Day Ever Come"
10	"The One True King (To Unite Them All)"	"A Real Life, Happily Ever After"
10	"The One True King (To Unite Them All)"	"Season 2 Finale"

An official soundtrack for the second season was released on January 29, 2016.

No.	Title	Performers	Length
1.	"A New Season"	Joshua Sasse, Hugh Bonneville, Timothy Omundson, Ben Presley, Darren Evans, Sophie McShera, Karen David, Mallory Jansen, Vinnie Jones, Luke Youngblood, and the Cast of Galavant	4:14
2.	"Off with His Shirt (feat. Kylie Minogue)"	Cast of Galavant	2:18
3.	"World's Best Kiss"	Karen David, and Joshua Sasse	1:45
4.	"Let's Agree to Disagree"	Vinnie Jones and Mallory Jansen	1:41
5.	"Build a New Tomorrow (feat. Matt Lucas)"	Timothy Omundson and the Cast of Galavant	1:50
6.	"The Happiest Day of Your Life (feat. Robert Lindsay)"	Karen David and the Cast of Galavant	2:25
7.	"If I Were a Jolly Blacksmith"	Timothy Omundson	2:14
8.	"As Good As It Gets"	Darren Evans and Sophie McShera	2:05
9.	"Serenade"	Joshua Sasse, Timothy Omundson, and Clare Foster	2:08
10.	"What Am I Feeling"	Mallory Jansen	2:14
11.	"My Dragon Pal and Me"	Timothy Omundson and the Cast of Galavant	1:42
12.	"Different Kind of Princess (feat. Sheridan Smith)"	Cast of Galavant	1:51
13.	"Dwarves vs. Giants"	Timothy Omundson, Joshua Sasse, Clare Foster and the Cast of Galavant	1:52
14.	"Today We Rise"	Luke Youngblood and the Cast of Galavant	2:10
15.	"He Was There"	Joshua Sasse and the Cast of Galavant	1:29
16.	"Time Is of the Essence (feat. Reece Shearsmith)"	Luke Youngblood	1:30
17.	"Goodbye (feat. Eddie Marsan)"	Joshua Sasse, Luke Youngblood, Mallory Jansen, Timothy Omundson, Clare Foster Karen David, and the Cast of Galavant	2:40
18.	"Love Makes the World Brand New"	Vinnie Jones	1:32
19.	"I Don't Like You"	Mallory Jansen and Karen David	1:36
20.	"Finally"	Timothy Omundson, Clare Foster and the Cast of Galavant	2:04
21.	"A Dark Season"	Karen David, Vinnie Jones, Mallory Jansen, Luke Youngblood, Clare Foster, Timothy Omundson, and Joshua Sasse	1:09
22.	"Galavant Recap"	Ben Presley	2:04
23.	"A Good Day to Die"	Vinnie Jones, Karen David, Ben Presley, Darren Evans, Sophie McShera, and the Cast of Galavant	3:13
24.	"Do the D'Dew"	Robert Lindsay and Mallory Jansen	1:48
25.	"Will My Day Ever Come (feat. Alfie Simmons)"	Timothy Omundson	2:10
26.	"A Real Life, Happily Ever After"	Joshua Sasse and Karen David	2:23
27.	"A Good Day to Die (Reprise)"	Joshua Sasse, Karen David, Vinnie Jones, Ben Presley and the Cast of Galavant	1:12
28.	"Season 2 Finale (feat. "Weird Al" Yankovic)"	Joshua Sasse, Karen David, Ben Presley, Vinnie Jones, Luke Youngblood, Mallory Jansen and the Cast of Galavant	3:51

== Home media ==
Galavant – The Complete Collection was released on DVD as a set consisting of both seasons in Region 1 on November 10, 2017. The series was made available to stream on Netflix. Galavant was later released on Hulu.

== Reception ==
=== Critical response ===
On the review aggregator website Rotten Tomatoes, for the first season, 78% of 40 critics' reviews are positive, with an average rating of 6.60/10. The website's consensus reads: "While the jokes in Galavant ride the line of predictability, their execution, along with campy themes and silly musical numbers, make it memorably entertaining." On Metacritic, it has a score of 64 out of 100, based on reviews from 30 critics, indicating "generally favorable reviews".

Brian Lowry of Variety praised Galavant for its spirited and cheeky take on the TV musical genre, observing that the show addresses the typical challenges of TV musicals by utilizing a half-hour format, which, as stated, condenses the "need to create songs into a manageable task." Lowry highlighted the influences of the show, saying that Galavant "draws a strong debt to Monty Python and a lesser one to spoofs like When Things Were Rotten," and commended the series, featuring music by Alan Menken and lyrics by Glenn Slater, for its "rambunctious energy" and "cheeky lyrics". The show's blend of serialized storytelling and comedic elements, such as landlocked pirates and anachronistic jokes, also earned Lowry's approval. Matt Mitovich of TVLine said they were initially approaching Galavant with some hesitation but were unexpectedly drawn into the show, even binge-watching the six episodes available. They acknowledged that the plot progression can feel slow due to the inclusion of song-and-dance numbers and the antics of the more colorful characters, such as the king. Mitovich remarked, "ABC is smart to double-pump episodes," suggesting that viewers will feel more satisfied watching two episodes at a time. Mitovich likened Galavant to Robin Hood: Men in Tights, noting its musical elements and higher production values, with a hint of The Princess Bride in its tone. They found the title track catchy, though they mentioned that while the other tunes might not be as memorable, the lyrics are often clever. Mitovich also highlighted some humorous lines, and praised Timothy Omundson for his portrayal of the clueless monarch.

Neil Genzlinger of The New York Times said Galavant is a playful yet inconsistent attempt at blending musical theater with television, stating that while the series, featuring Joshua Sasse as the titular hero, aims for a whimsical tone reminiscent of The Princess Bride and Monty Python's Spamalot, it often feels labored and doesn't fully capture the magic of live theater, though it earns points for trying something different. Nevertheless, it was recognized by Genzlinger for its inventive approach to the genre. Alan Sepinwall of HitFix, however, was more negative, writing, "...the whole is less than the sum of its comic and musical parts."

The second season was met with equally positive critical response: On Rotten Tomatoes, it has a 100% rating, based on 11 reviews, with an average rating of 7.80/10. The consensus reads: "The surprise second season of Galavant sends its cast in many directions, but keeps the fun and music that made it a hit firmly at its center." On Metacritic, it has a score of 77 out of 100, based on reviews from 4 critics, indicating "generally favorable reviews".

=== Ratings ===
==== Season 1 (2015) ====
The first season averaged 4.83 million live viewers, and 6.52 million including DVR-playback.

Viewership and ratings per episode of Galavant
No.	Title	Air date	Rating/share (18–49)	Viewers (millions)	DVR (18–49)	DVR viewers (millions)	Total (18–49)	Total viewers (millions)
1	"Pilot"	January 4, 2015	2.0/5	7.42	0.9	2.53	2.9	9.95
2	"Joust Friends"	January 4, 2015	2.0/5	7.42	0.9	2.53	2.9	9.95
3	"Two Balls"	January 11, 2015	1.3/3	4.11	—N/a	—N/a	—N/a	—N/a
4	"Comedy Gold"	January 11, 2015	1.3/3	4.11	—N/a	—N/a	—N/a	—N/a
5	"Completely Mad...Alena"	January 18, 2015	0.9/2	3.42	0.6	—N/a	1.5	—N/a
6	"Dungeons and Dragon Lady"	January 18, 2015	0.9/2	3.42	0.6	—N/a	1.5	—N/a
7	"My Cousin Izzy"	January 25, 2015	1.1/3	4.37	—N/a	—N/a	—N/a	—N/a
8	"It's All in the Executions"	January 25, 2015	1.1/3	4.37	—N/a	—N/a	—N/a	—N/a

==== Season 2 (2016) ====
Viewership and ratings per episode of Galavant
No.	Title	Air date	Rating/share (18–49)	Viewers (millions)	DVR (18–49)	DVR viewers (millions)	Total (18–49)	Total viewers (millions)
1	"A New Season aka Suck It; Cancellation Bear"	January 3, 2016	0.9/3	3.20	—N/a	—N/a	—N/a	—N/a
2	"World's Best Kiss"	January 3, 2016	0.9/3	3.20	—N/a	—N/a	—N/a	—N/a
3	"Aw, Hell, the King"	January 10, 2016	0.6/2	2.41	0.3	0.75	0.9	3.16
4	"Bewitched, Bothered, and Belittled"	January 10, 2016	0.6/2	2.41	0.3	0.75	0.9	3.16
5	"Giants vs. Dwarves"	January 17, 2016	0.6/2	2.32	—N/a	0.71	—N/a	3.03
6	"About Last Knight"	January 17, 2016	0.6/2	2.32	—N/a	0.71	—N/a	3.03
7	"Love and Death"	January 24, 2016	0.5/2	2.10	—N/a	—N/a	—N/a	—N/a
8	"Do the D'DEW"	January 24, 2016	0.5/2	2.10	—N/a	—N/a	—N/a	—N/a
9	"Battle of the Three Armies"	January 31, 2016	0.6/2	2.15	—N/a	—N/a	—N/a	—N/a
10	"The One True King (To Unite Them All)"	January 31, 2016	0.6/2	2.15	—N/a	—N/a	—N/a	—N/a

Galavant : U.S. viewers per episode (millions)

Season	Episode number									
Season	1	2	3	4	5	6	7	8	9	10
1	7.42	7.42	4.11	4.11	3.42	3.42	4.37	4.37	–	
2	3.20	3.20	2.41	2.41	2.32	2.32	2.10	2.10	2.15	2.15

Audience measurement performed by Nielsen Media Research

== Accolades ==
Galavant was nominated for Outstanding Achievement in Sound Editing – Music Score and Musical for Episodic Short Form Broadcast Media at the 2015 Golden Reel Awards. It was also nominated for Outstanding Original Music and Lyrics at the 2016 Primetime Emmy Awards.
