= Love Is in the Air (2023 film) =

2023 Australian film

- Official promotional poster
- Directed by: Adrian Powers
- Screenplay by: Adrian Powers; Caera Bradshaw; Katharine E. McPhee
- Produced by: Steve Jaggi; Kelly Son Hing; Kylie Pascoe
- Starring: Delta Goodrem; Joshua Sasse; Roy Billing
- Cinematography: Tony O'Loughlan
- Edited by: Ahmad Halimi
- Production company: The Steve Jaggi Company
- Distributed by: Netflix
- Release date: 28 September 2023 (Netflix)
- Running time: 88 minutes
- Country: Australia
- Language: English

Love Is in the Air is a 2023 Australian romantic comedy film co-written and directed by Adrian Powers. The film stars Delta Goodrem and Joshua Sasse.

Seaplane pilot Dana flies for her family company in the north Australian tropics, inadvertently mutually falling in love with William, the man sent to shut down their business.

The film became available for streaming on Netflix from 28 September 2023.

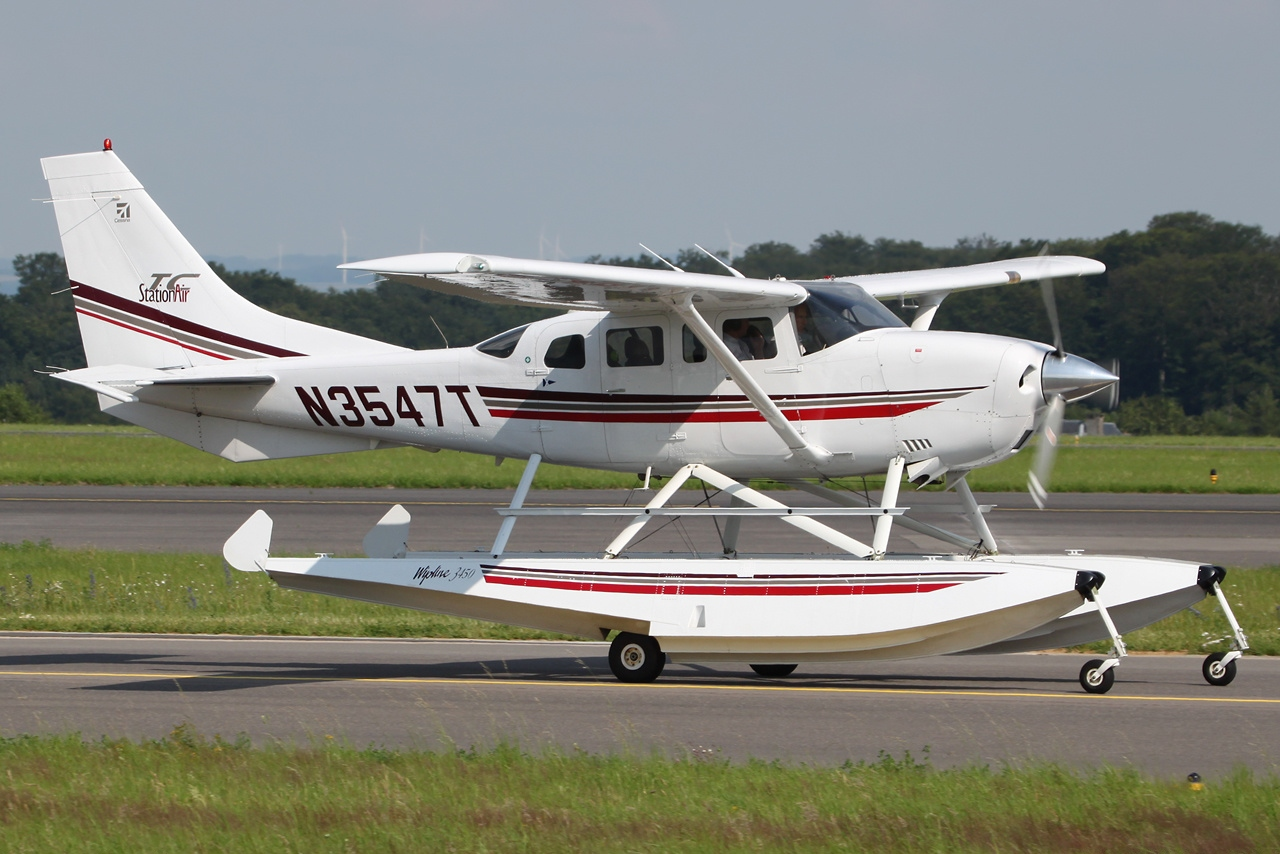
A Cessna 206 similar to the one in the movie

== Plot ==
Dana Randall is the pilot for Fullerton Airways, the tiny Queensland company which both aids people in the remote area and serves visiting tourists. Her dad Jeff chides her for blowing off high-paying visitors to transport a resident's dog to the vet, as their bills are mounting.

William Mitchell is sent all the way from London by ITCM Financial, his father Duncan's UK investment firm, to the tropics of Australia to shut down Fullerton Airways. He had researched companies they have been backing and pinpoints the small, flailing, family-run seaplane business as ideal for liquidation as it lacks income. He is given a week to visit the company, go over their financials in person and return to the Board to shut them down, proving to his father he is ready to move up in the company. Duncan warns not to get involved emotionally to the place.

Fullerton's airplane mechanic Nikki pushes Dana to find time to date, but she hesitates. The next morning, Jeff warns them a rep from ITCM Financial is coming for an inspection. Dana is asked to pick up Will from the ferry, and initially they have a testy relationship. She is quick to defend their remote air support, although Jeff tries to downplay it.

Dana whizzes Will around to a community off the coast of far-north Queensland to deliver parcels to people in need, which she visits every two weeks as they would otherwise be totally cut off. Again, Nikki and Jeff convince him to accompany her on her rounds a second day. This time the engine fails, but Dana keeps her cool and fixes the problem. Afterwards, having drinks in Fullerton, Dana's ex Heath sees her chemistry with Will and both he and Nikki encourage her to pursue him. So, they spend time together while crossing the tarmac, star-gazing and sharing.

On the third day of helping Dana, Will's father loses patience with him. Will tries to convince Duncan that they were wrong to want to write off the small aeronautical company, but Nikki overhears. Dana chews Will out without hearing his part, much to Nikki's pepping, when confirmation of an impending cyclone reaches them.

Will helps Dana find an injured Jeff, who had been trying to help others seek safety against the cyclone. Dana continues to accuse Will, but he explains he plans to officially support their airline. The three-person staff of Fullerton Airways hole up with Will in the hangar's storage room to wait out the storm. He pledges to fight for their company at his headquarters, as he cares for Dana.

The next morning, after the storm passes, Will helps Dana deliver emergency supplies to many remote locations. By nightfall, she has made peace with him. However, as they are closing up the hangar for the night, Jeff announces that ITCM Financial has sent an e-mail shutting them down immediately.

Will returns to London and had been unsuccessful in swaying the board. Dana arrives unannounced, armed with a plan to revamp and expand Fullerton Airways. In response to Duncan's negative response, Will resigns and offers himself to Dana to aid them in their expansion.

ITCM Financial backs their endeavour with Will, and Fullerton Airways is shown to have expanded and now has a more professional look. Will is happily installed there with the company and Dana, as the two have fallen for each other.

== Cast ==
- Delta Goodrem as Dana Randall
- Joshua Sasse as William Mitchell
- Roy Billing as Jeff Randall
- Steph Tisdell as Nikki
- Simon Brook McLachlan as Heath
- Daniela Pizzirani as Serena
- Mia Grunwald as Michelle
- Hugh Parker as Duncan Mitchell
- Dante Surace as Lachie
- Richard Wheeler as Packers Bay Resident

== Production ==
Produced by Brisbane-based Jaggi Entertainment and directed by Adrian Powers, the film was shot in Queensland's Whitsunday Region including Lake Proserpine, supported by the Queensland Government via Screen Queensland. In a statement producer Steve Jaggi said, "Shot entirely on location, we pushed the boundaries by shooting in glorious 8K Vista Vision."

== Release ==
Netflix made the film available globally for streaming on 28 September 2023. In its first two weeks, the movie had been streamed 20 million times.

== Reception ==
On the review aggregator Rotten Tomatoes website, the film had an approval rating of 25% based on 8 reviews, with an average rating of 3.9/10.

Luke Buckmaster reviewing for The Guardian criticised the screenplay describing it as predictable. Commenting on Goodrem’s performance, Buckmaster said, "it is far from great, but delivering lines like that without blushing does require some talent." Buckmaster rated the film with 1 star out of 5, describing "a very corny and saccharine romance: a galumphing heffalump of a movie that is best – and perhaps only – enjoyed by devotees of the Sydney-born performer (Delta Goodrem)." Lori C., writing in Ready Steady Cut graded the film 2.5/5, describing "how soothingly predictable the script is," with viewers remaining far from "the edge of your seat. And that’s not necessarily a bad thing."
