= Underfunded =

- Directed by: John Fortenberry
- Written by: David Breckman; Ross Abrash
- Starring: Mather Zickel; Joanna Canton
- Narrated by: Mather Zickel
- Music by: David Schwartz
- Distributed by: USA Network
- Release date: November 8, 2006
- Country: United States
- Language: English

Underfunded is a comedy-drama made-for-TV movie that aired the United States cable television channel USA Network on November 8, 2006 at 10 PM EDT.

It stars Mather Zickel as Darryl Freehorn, an agent in the Canadian Secret Service (CSS).

== Plot ==
Caught between a constricting budget and an inane American Intelligence Community, Canadian Secret Service agent Darryl Freehorn works as a liaison with the U.S. State Department to solve international conspiracies and busts American prescription drug smugglers. Freehorn is frequently met with skepticism by American officials when he introduces himself as an agent of the CSS, to which he always responds with "We have one, too." Costar Joanna Canton plays Naomi Lutz, a smitten assistant to Freehorn bucking for a job as a full-blown agent. Occasionally over-enthusiastic and she cites her knowledge of the West Wing on NBC as her qualification for a trip to Washington, D.C.

== See also ==
- InSecurity
