= Mallory Jansen =

Australian actress

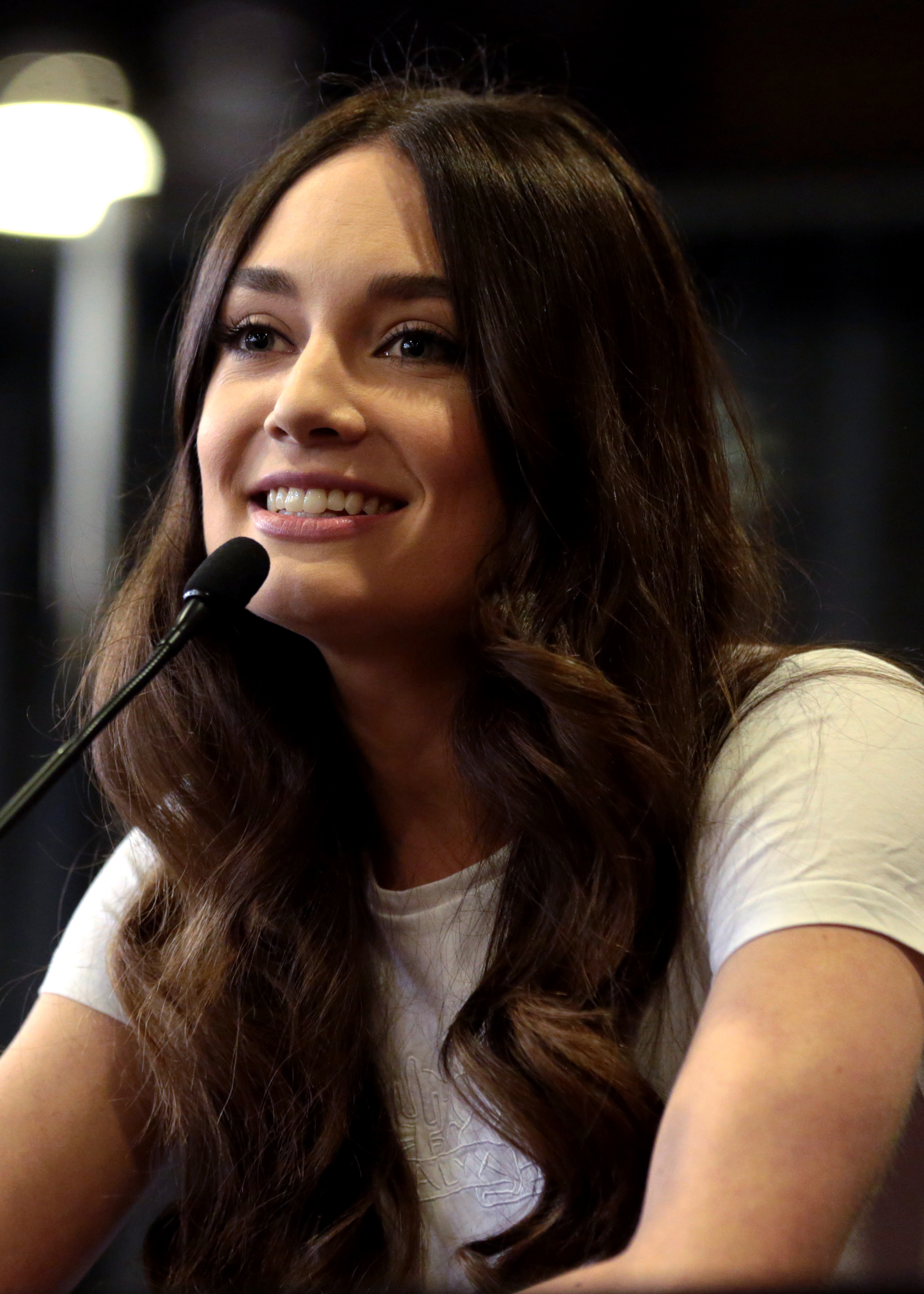
- Jansen in 2017
- Born: 1989 or 1990 (age 36–37)
- Occupation: Actress
- Years active: 2012–present
- Spouse: Simon Phan

Mallory Jansen (born 1989 or 1990) is an Australian actress and model. She is best known for playing Aida / Ophelia / Madame Hydra in the Marvel Cinematic Universe (MCU) television series Agents of S.H.I.E.L.D.

== Early life ==
Jansen was born in Australia. In 2011, she moved to New York to train at the Stella Adler Studio of Acting and the T. Schreiber Studio & Theatre.

== Career ==
In 2013, Jansen was cast as Madalena in the ABC series Galavant.

In 2014, Jansen played Helena Christensen in the two-part miniseries INXS: Never Tear Us Apart. She had recurring roles in the ABC Family sitcoms Baby Daddy and Young & Hungry.

Following the cancellation of Galavant, Jansen joined the cast of Agents of S.H.I.E.L.D. in 2016 as Aida, Agnes Kitsworth, the human template of the former, and Madame Hydra.

In 2019, Jansen was cast in the pilot of the ABC drama Triangle alongside Edwin Hodge. In 2020, she was cast in the Fox series The Big Leap, which was canceled after one season.

== Personal life ==
Jansen moved to Los Angeles in 2013. She is married to Simon Phan.

== Filmography ==
=== Film ===
Year	Title	Role	Notes
2013	Half Way	Syd	Short film
TBA	R.U.R.	Helena Glory	

=== Television ===
Year	Title	Role	Notes
2012	Howzat! Kerry Packer's War	Sharon	Miniseries
2013	Mr & Mrs Murder	Rachel Glass	Episode: "En Vogue"
2013	Twentysomething	Kelly	Episode: "Fake It Till You Make It"
2014	INXS: Never Tear Us Apart	Helena Christensen	Miniseries
2014	Baby Daddy	Georgie Farlow	4 episodes
2014	Young & Hungry	Caroline Penelope Huntington	Recurring role
2015–2016	Galavant	Madalena	Main role
2016–2017	Agents of S.H.I.E.L.D.	Aida / Madame Hydra, Agnes Kitsworth	Recurring role
2017	American Housewife	Nina	Episodes: "Back to School" & "The Uprising"
2018	This Is Us	Emma Wade	Episode: "Vegas, Baby"
2018	Shooter	Margo	4 episodes
2020	On the 12th Date of Christmas	Jennifer Holloway	Television film
2021	The Big Leap	Monica Suillvan	Main role
2021	Her Pen Pal	Victoria	Television film
2022	Francesca Quinn, PI	Francesca Quinn	Television film
2022	Bugs Bunny Builders	Moxie Manatee (voice)	2 episodes
2024	Paging Mr. Darcy	Eloise Cavendish	Television film
2024	All I Need for Christmas	Maggie McKenzie	Television film
2025	The Royal We	Bea	Television film
2026	A Melbourne Match	Georgie	Television film
2026	Will Trent	Adelaide Trevens	3 episodes
