= John Fortenberry =

American film and television director

- Born: Jackson, Mississippi, U.S.
- Education: University of Mississippi
- Occupations: Film director, film editor, television director, television producer

John Fortenberry is an American film and television director.

== Early life ==
Born in Jackson, Mississippi, Fortenberry graduated from the University of Mississippi.

== Career ==
After leaving the University of Mississippi, Fortenberry worked at Lorne Michaels' Broadway Video, serving as an editor for eight years before becoming a film and television producer.

Fortenberry has directed the films A Night at the Roxbury, Underfunded, Medusa: Dare to Be Truthful, Fred 2: Night of the Living Fred and Jury Duty. He has also directed episode of the television shows Sonny with a Chance, It's Always Sunny in Philadelphia, Everybody Loves Raymond, The King of Queens, Blue Mountain State, Rescue Me, Memphis Beat, Arrested Development, and Galavant.

In 2020, Fortenberry appeared as a guest on the Studio 60 on the Sunset Strip marathon fundraiser episode of The George Lucas Talk Show.

== Filmography ==
- Medusa: Dare to Be Truthful (1991)
- Jury Duty (1995)
- A Night at the Roxbury (1998)
- Underfunded (2006)
- Fred 2: Night of the Living Fred (2011)
