= Michael Lange =

American television director (born 1950)

Michael Lange (born March 1, 1950) is an American television director and record producer. Lange first developed a taste for drama in college, where he served as both an actor and director in a number of productions. He studied theatre at George Washington University. After college, he started his own regional theatre in Teaneck, New Jersey before moving onto advertising. In 1980, after 8 years in the advertising business, he had moved to California aspiring to become a film and television director. His first job was on The Fall Guy in 1982 as a post production assistant. He went on to gain directorial credits from two hundred and forty television episodes, including The O.C., Beverly Hills, 90210, Northern Exposure, Buffy the Vampire Slayer, The X-Files, One Tree Hill, Dawson's Creek, Everwood, Criminal Minds and Bones. He has directed one feature film, Intern, the Disney Channel television movie Jumping Ship, and the ABC Family TV film "My Future Boyfriend". He is a co-executive producer/director of the ABC Family series, "Greek" and Lifetime's "Drop Dead Diva". In 2010, Lange co-created Flashbang Productions, LLC, a partnership with Shannon Murphy. In 2018, Lange launched his own radio show and podcast called "From The Set With Michael Lange".

== Early life ==
Born and raised just outside New York City, in Mamaroneck, New York and attending Mamaroneck High School where he was heavily involved in music and a bit in drama, Michael Lange first developed a taste for drama in college, where he served as both an actor and director in a number of productions. Although pressured by his parents to become a doctor, he went on to study theatre at The George Washington University in Washington, D.C. After college, he started his own regional theatre in Teaneck, New Jersey, and was also active in a number of musical groups. He produced and directed several plays at the theatre before moving onto advertising. He then worked at an advertising company, Cunningham & Walsh, for five years as a producer, before he moved to Creamer Advertising in New York City for which he served as head of television and radio production. In 1980, he quit after eight years in the advertising business and moved to California aspiring to become a film and television director.

== Career ==
Lange's first job was on The Fall Guy in 1982 as a post production assistant and after a year he was promoted to second unit director, in which role he shot almost thirty episodes (second unit only) for the show. He then moved on to Riptide and later, in his self-described leap to "quality television", Life Goes On in 1993. Since then, he has garnered directorial credits from two hundred and forty television episodes, including amongst many others The O.C., Beverly Hills, 90210, The Larry Sanders Show, Tracey Takes On..., Northern Exposure, Eureka, The Pretender, Buffy the Vampire Slayer, The X-Files, Eli Stone Brothers & Sisters, One Tree Hill, Dirty Sexy Money, Dawson's Creek, Point Pleasant, Miss Match, Everwood, Diagnosis: Murder, Jake and the Fatman, The Royals, and Greek. He has directed one feature film, Intern, and the Disney Channel television movie Jumping Ship. In late 2010 he directed a TV Movie for ABC Family entitled "My Future Boyfriend". He has recently been working on the ABC Family series, "Greek" as a Co-Executive Producer/Director. Additionally, he's the Co-Executive Producer/Director on Lifetime's "Drop Dead Diva". He's about to begin working on a new ABC Family series called "Jane By Design" as Co-Executive Producer/Director.

Having been in a number of bands growing up, Lange's other business is in music. He and his colleague and roommate from college days, Peter Gorin, run Silly Music Corporation, a record company that produces song parodies of Broadway musicals with a Jewish spin. Their music arranger/composer is Michael's High School friend, Marc Ellis.

In 2010, Lange co-created Flashbang Productions, LLC, a partnership with Shannon Murphy. Flashbang developed several projects involving the Bureau of Alcohol, Tobacco, Firearms and Explosives; a one-hour drama, tentatively titled "ATF", a documentary/reality show about the dogs of the ATF called "At The Frontline: ATF", in partnership with MPH Productions, and a reality show about Search and Rescue dogs. However, none of the projects came to fruition.

In the last few years Lange has directed several episodes of Switched at Birth, Criminal Minds and Bones. He has begun preparation for his second indie film, Cowboy Drifter, to be shot in Albuquerque, New Mexico.

=== Radio show ===
In 2018, Lange launched his own radio show and podcast called "From The Set With Michael Lange" the show is co-produced by Ethan Dettenmaier and centers around his work on X Files, Bones, Criminal Minds and more.

== Personal life ==
Lange is Jewish, a background that has given him inspiration for Kosher Christmas Carols, a collection of musical parodies written by Peter Gorin and himself, and also landed him a minor role in an episode of The O.C. in which he played a Rabbi.
