= List of musicals adapted into feature films =

This is a list of musicals that have been adapted into feature films.

The title of the musical is followed by its first public performance, the composer, the lyricist, the book writer, the title of the film adapted from the musical, the year of the film, and the film's director. If a film has an alternate title based on geographical distribution, the title listed will be that of the widest distribution area.

Musical	Music	Lyrics	Book	Film	Film director
13 (2007)	Jason Robert Brown	Jason Robert Brown	Dan Elish; Robert Horn	13: The Musical (2022)	Tamra Davis
1776 (1969)	Sherman Edwards	Sherman Edwards	Peter Stone	1776 (1972)	Peter H. Hunt
Alma, Where Do You Live? (1910)	Jean Briquet	George V. Hobart	George V. Hobart	Alma, Where Do You Live? (1917)	Hal Clarendon
Animal Crackers (1928)	Bert Kalmar; Harry Ruby	Bert Kalmar; Harry Ruby	George S. Kaufman; Morrie Ryskind	Animal Crackers (1930)	Victor Heerman
Annie (1976)	Charles Strouse	Martin Charnin	Thomas Meehan	Annie (1982)	John Huston
Annie (1976)	Charles Strouse	Martin Charnin	Thomas Meehan	Annie: A Royal Adventure! (1995)	Bille Woodruff
Annie (1976)	Charles Strouse	Martin Charnin	Thomas Meehan	Annie (1999)	Rob Marshall
Annie (1976)	Charles Strouse	Martin Charnin	Thomas Meehan	Annie (2014)	Will Gluck
Annie Get Your Gun (1946)	Irving Berlin	Irving Berlin	Herbert and Dorothy Fields	Annie Get Your Gun (1950)	George Sidney
Annie Get Your Gun (1946)	Irving Berlin	Irving Berlin	Herbert and Dorothy Fields	Annie Get Your Gun (1957)	Vincent J. Donehue
Annie Get Your Gun (1946)	Irving Berlin	Irving Berlin	Herbert and Dorothy Fields	Annie Get Your Gun (1967)	Clark Jones
Anything Goes (1934)	Cole Porter	Cole Porter	Guy Bolton; P. G. Wodehouse	Anything Goes (1936)	Lewis Milestone
Anything Goes (1934)	Cole Porter	Cole Porter	Guy Bolton; P. G. Wodehouse	Anything Goes (1956)	Robert Lewis
Are You with It? (1945)	Harry Revel	Arnold B. Horwitt	Sam Perrin; George Balzer	Are You with It? (1939)	Jack Hively
Av. Larco: El Musical			Rasec Barragán & Giovanni Ciccia	Av. Larco (2017)	Jorge Carmona
Babes in Arms (1937)	Richard Rodgers	Lorenz Hart	Rodgers and Hart	Babes in Arms (1939)	Busby Berkeley
Balalaika (1936)	George Posford; Bernard Grun	Eric Maschwitz	Eric Maschwitz	Balalaika (1939)	Reinhold Schünzel
The Band Wagon (1931)	Arthur Schwartz	Howard Dietz	George S. Kaufman; Howard Dietz	Dancing in the Dark (1949)	Irving Reis
The Band Wagon (1931)	Arthur Schwartz	Howard Dietz	George S. Kaufman; Howard Dietz	The Band Wagon (1953)	Vincente Minnelli
Beatlemania (1977)	The Beatles	The Beatles	Bob Gill; Robert Rabinowitz; Lynda Obst	Beatlemania: The Movie (1981)	Jason Manduke
Been So Long (2009)	Arthur Darvill	Arthur Darvill	Ché Walker	Been So Long (2018)	Tinge Krishnan
Bells Are Ringing (1956)	Jule Styne	Betty Comden; Adolph Green	Betty Comden; Adolph Green	Bells Are Ringing (1960)	Vincente Minnelli
Best Foot Forward (1941)	Hugh Martin and Ralph Blane	Hugh Martin and Ralph Blane	John Cecil Holm	Best Foot Forward (1943)	Edward Buzzell
The Best Little Whorehouse in Texas (1978)	Carol Hall	Carol Hall	Larry L. King; Peter Masterson	The Best Little Whorehouse in Texas (1982)	Colin Higgins
The Better 'Ole (1917)	Herman Darewski	Percival Knight; James Heard	Bruce Bairnsfather; Arthur Elliot	The Romance of Old Bill (1918)	George Pearson
The Better 'Ole (1917)	Herman Darewski	Percival Knight; James Heard	Bruce Bairnsfather; Arthur Elliot	The Better 'Ole (1926)	Charles Reisner
Big Boy (1925)	James F. Hanley; Joseph Meyer	Buddy DeSylva	Harold Atteridge	Big Band (1930)	Alan Crosland
Black Nativity (1961)	Traditional gospel spirituals chosen by Langston Hughes	Traditional gospel spirituals chosen by Langston Hughes	Langston Hughes	Black Nativity (2013)	Kasi Lemmons
The Boy Friend (1953)	Sandy Wilson	Sandy Wilson	Sandy Wilson	The Boy Friend (1971)	Ken Russell
The Boys from Syracuse (1938)	Richard Rodgers	Lorenz Hart	George Abbott	The Boys from Syracuse (1940)	A. Edward Sutherland
Bran Nue Dae (1990)	Jimmy Chi; Kuckles	Jimmy Chi; Kuckles	Jimmy Chi	Bran Nue Dae (2009)	Rachel Perkins
Brigadoon (1947)	Frederick Loewe	Alan Jay Lerner	Alan Jay Lerner	Brigadoon (1954)	Vincente Minnelli
Brigadoon (1947)	Frederick Loewe	Alan Jay Lerner	Alan Jay Lerner	Brigadoon (1966)	Fielder Cook
Bye Bye Birdie (1960)	Charles Strouse	Lee Adams	Michael Stewart	Bye Bye Birdie (1963)	George Sidney
Bye Bye Birdie (1960)	Charles Strouse	Lee Adams	Michael Stewart	Bye Bye Birdie (1995)	Gene Saks
Cabaret (1966)	John Kander	Fred Ebb	Joe Masteroff	Cabaret (1972)	Bob Fosse
Cabin in the Sky (1940)	Vernon Duke	John Latouche	Lynn Root	Cabin in the Sky (1943)	Vincente Minnelli
Camelot (1960)	Frederick Loewe	Alan Jay Lerner	Alan Jay Lerner	Camelot (1967)	Joshua Logan
Can-Can (1953)	Cole Porter	Cole Porter	Abe Burrows	Can-Can (1960)	Walter Lang
Carmen Jones (1943)	Georges Bizet	Oscar Hammerstein II	Oscar Hammerstein II	Carmen Jones (1954)	Otto Preminger
Carousel (1945)	Richard Rodgers	Oscar Hammerstein II	Oscar Hammerstein II	Carousel (1956)	Henry King
Carousel (1945)	Richard Rodgers	Oscar Hammerstein II	Oscar Hammerstein II	Carousel (1967)	Paul Bogart
The Cat and the Fiddle (1931)	Jerome Kern	Otto Harbach	Otto Harbach	The Cat and the Fiddle (1934)	William K. Howard
Cats (1981)	Andrew Lloyd Webber	T. S. Eliot; Trevor Nunn; Richard Stilgoe	T. S. Eliot	Cats (1998)	David Mallet
Cats (1981)	Andrew Lloyd Webber	T. S. Eliot; Trevor Nunn; Richard Stilgoe	T. S. Eliot	Cats (2019)	Tom Hooper
Chicago (1975)	John Kander	Fred Ebb	Fred Ebb; Bob Fosse	Chicago (2002)	Rob Marshall
A Chorus Line (1975)	Marvin Hamlisch	Edward Kleban	James Kirkwood Jr. Nicholas Dante	A Chorus Line (1985)	Richard Attenborough
The City Club	James Compton; Tony de Meur; Tim Brown	James Compton; Tony de Meur; Tim Brown	Glenn M. Stewart	Dark Streets (2008)	Rachel Samuels
The Cocoanuts (1925)	Irving Berlin	Irving Berlin	George S. Kaufman; Morrie Ryskind (additional text)	The Cocoanuts (1929)	Robert Florey; Joseph Santley
Cyrano (2018)	The National		Erica Schmidt	Cyrano (2021)	Joe Wright
Damn Yankees (1955)	Richard Adler and Jerry Ross	Richard Adler and Jerry Ross	George Abbott; Douglass Wallop	Damn Yankees (1958)	George Abbott; Stanley Donen
Damn Yankees (1955)	Richard Adler and Jerry Ross	Richard Adler and Jerry Ross	George Abbott; Douglass Wallop	Damn Yankees! (1967)	Kirk Browning
Darling, I Love You (1930)			Stanley Brightman; Arthur Rigby	The Deputy Drummer (1935)	Lupino Lane
Dear Evan Hansen (2015)	Benj Pasek; Justin Paul	Pasek and Paul	Steven Levenson	Dear Evan Hansen (2021)	Stephen Chbosky
The Deb (2022)	Megan Washington	Megan Washington; Hannah Reilly	Hannah Reilly	The Deb (2024)	Rebel Wilson
Dreamgirls (1981)	Henry Krieger	Tom Eyen	Tom Eyen	Dreamgirls (2006)	Bill Condon
Don't Play Us Cheap (1970)	Melvin Van Peebles	Melvin Van Peebles	Melvin Van Peebles	Don't Play Us Cheap (1973)	Melvin Van Peebles
Du Barry Was a Lady (1939)	Cole Porter	Cole Porter	Herbert Fields and Buddy DeSylva	Du Barry Was a Lady (1943)	Roy Del Ruth
Ever Green (1930)	Richard Rodgers	Lorenz Hart	Benn Levy	Evergreen (1934)	Victor Saville
Everybody's Talking About Jamie (2017)	Dan Gillespie Sells	Tom MacRae	Tom MacRae	Everybody's Talking About Jamie (2021)	Jonathan Butterell
Fanny (1954)	Harold Rome	Harold Rome	S. N. Behrman; Joshua Logan	Fanny (1968)	Joshua Logan
The Fantasticks (1960)	Harvey Schmidt	Tom Jones	Tom Jones	The Fantasticks (2000)	Michael Ritchie
Fiddler on the Roof (1964)	Jerry Bock	Sheldon Harnick	Joseph Stein	Fiddler on the Roof (1971)	Norman Jewison
Fifty Million Frenchmen (1929)	Cole Porter	Cole Porter	Herbert Fields	50 Million Frenchmen (1931)	Lloyd Bacon
Finian's Rainbow (1947)	Burton Lane	Yip Harburg	Yip Harburg; Fred Saidy	Finian's Rainbow (1968)	Francis Ford Coppola
Flower Drum Song (1958)	Richard Rodgers	Oscar Hammerstein II	Oscar Hammerstein II; Joseph Fields	Flower Drum Song (1961)	Henry Koster
Flying High (1930)	Ray Henderson	Lew Brown; Buddy DeSylva	Buddy DeSylva; Lew Brown; Jack McGowan	Flying High (1931)	Charles Reisner
Follow Thru (1929)	Ray Henderson	Lew Brown; Buddy DeSylva	Laurence Schwab Buddy DeSylva	Follow Thru (1930)	Laurence Schwab Lloyd Corrigan
For Goodness Sake (1922)	William Daly; Paul Lannin	Arthur Jackson	Frederick J. Jackson	Stop Flirting (1925)	Scott Sidney
Freaky Friday (2016)	Tom Kitt	Brian Yorkey	Bridget Carpenter	Freaky Friday (2018)	Steve Carr
Fucking Identical Twins (2016)	Karl St. Lucy		Aaron Jackson; Josh Sharp	Dicks: The Musical (2023)	Larry Charles
Funny Face (1927)	George Gershwin	Ira Gershwin	Paul Gerard Smith; Fred Thompson	She Knew What She Wanted (1936)	Thomas Bentley
Funny Face (1927)	George Gershwin	Ira Gershwin	Paul Gerard Smith; Fred Thompson	Funny Face (1957)	Stanley Donen
Funny Girl (1964)	Jule Styne	Bob Merrill	Isobel Lennart	Funny Girl (1968)	William Wyler
A Funny Thing Happened on the Way to the Forum (1962)	Stephen Sondheim	Stephen Sondheim	Burt Shevelove; Larry Gelbart	A Funny Thing Happened on the Way to the Forum (1966)	Richard Lester
Gay Divorce (1932)	Cole Porter	Cole Porter	Dwight Taylor; Adapted by: Kenneth Webb and Samuel Hoffenstein	The Gay Divorcee (1934)	Mark Sandrich
Gentlemen Prefer Blondes (1949)	Jule Styne	Leo Robin	Joseph Fields; Anita Loos	Gentlemen Prefer Blondes (1953)	Howard Hawks
Girl Crazy (1930)	George Gershwin	Ira Gershwin	Guy Bolton; John McGowan	Girl Crazy (1932)	William A. Seiter
Girl Crazy (1930)	George Gershwin	Ira Gershwin	Guy Bolton; John McGowan	Girl Crazy (1943)	Norman Taurog; Busby Berkeley
Girl Crazy (1930)	George Gershwin	Ira Gershwin	Guy Bolton; John McGowan	When the Boys Meet the Girls (1965)	Alvin Ganzer
The Glorious Days (1952)	Harry Parr Davis; Harold Purcell		Robert Nesbitt; Miles Malleson	Lilacs in the Spring (1954)	Herbert Wilcox
Godspell (1971)	Stephen Schwartz	Stephen Schwartz	John-Michael Tebelak	Godspell (1973)	David Greene
Good News (1927)	Ray Henderson	Buddy DeSylva; Lew Brown	Laurence Schwab; Buddy DeSylva	Good News (1930)	Nick Grinde
Good News (1927)	Ray Henderson	Buddy DeSylva; Lew Brown	Laurence Schwab; Buddy DeSylva	Good News (1947)	Charles Walters
Grease (1971)	Jim Jacobs; Warren Casey	Jim Jacobs; Warren Casey; John Farrar	Jim Jacobs; Warren Casey	Grease (1978)	Randal Kleiser
Greatest Days (2017)	Take That	Take That	Tim Firth	Greatest Days (2023)	Coky Giedroyc
Guys and Dolls (1950)	Frank Loesser	Frank Loesser	Jo Swerling; Abe Burrows	Guys and Dolls (1955)	Joseph L. Mankiewicz
Gypsy (1959)	Jule Styne	Stephen Sondheim	Arthur Laurents	Gypsy (1962)	Mervyn LeRoy
Gypsy (1959)	Jule Styne	Stephen Sondheim	Arthur Laurents	Gypsy (1993)	Emile Ardolino
Hair (1967)	Galt MacDermot	Gerome Ragni; James Rado	Gerome Ragni; James Rado	Hair (1979)	Miloš Forman
Hairspray (2002)	Marc Shaiman	Marc Shaiman; Scott Wittman	Thomas Meehan; Mark O'Donnell	Hairspray (2007)	Adam Shankman
Half a Sixpence (1963)	David Heneker	David Heneker	Beverley Cross	Half a Sixpence (1967)	George Sidney
Hamilton: An American Musical (2015)	Lin-Manuel Miranda	Lin-Manuel Miranda	Lin-Manuel Miranda	Hamilton (2020)	Thomas Kail
Hazel Flagg (1953)	Jule Styne	Bob Hilliard	James H. Street	Living It Up (1954)	Norman Taurog
Hedwig and the Angry Inch (1998)	Stephen Trask	Stephen Trask	John Cameron Mitchell	Hedwig and the Angry Inch (2001)	John Cameron Mitchell
Hello, Dolly! (1964)	Jerry Herman	Jerry Herman	Michael Stewart	Hello, Dolly! (1969)	Gene Kelly
Hellzapoppin (1938)	Sammy Fain; Charles Tobias	Sammy Fain; Charles Tobias	Harold "Chic" Johnson; John "Ole" Olsen	Hellzapoppin' (1941)	H. C. Potter
Hero				Hero (2022)	Yoon Je-kyoon
Higher and Higher (1940)	Richard Rodgers	Lorenz Hart	Gladys Hurlbut; Joshua Logan	Higher and Higher (1943)	Tim Whelan
Hit the Deck (1927)	Vincent Youmans	Clifford Grey	Herbert Fields	Hit the Deck (1930)	Luther Reed
Hit the Deck (1927)	Vincent Youmans	Clifford Grey	Herbert Fields	Hit the Deck (1955)	Roy Rowland
Hold My Hand (1931)			Stanley Lupino	Hold My Hand (1938)	Thornton Freeland
How to Succeed in Business Without Really Trying (1961)	Frank Loesser	Frank Loesser	Abe Burrows; Jack Weinstock; Willie Gilbert	How to Succeed in Business Without Really Trying (1967)	David Swift
I Married an Angel (1938)	Richard Rodgers	Lorenz Hart	Rodgers and Hart	I Married an Angel (1942)	W. S. Van Dyke
I'm Sorry the Bridge is Out, You'll Have to Spend the Night (1967)			Bobby Pickett and Sheldon Allman	Monster Mash (1995)	Joel Cohen; Alec Sokolow
In the Heights (2008)	Lin-Manuel Miranda	Lin-Manuel Miranda	Quiara Alegría Hudes	In the Heights (2021)	Jon M. Chu
Into the Woods (1987)	Stephen Sondheim	Stephen Sondheim	James Lapine	Into the Woods (2014)	Rob Marshall
Irene (1919)	Harry Tierney	Joseph McCarthy	James Montgomery; Joseph Stein	Irene (1940)	Herbert Wilcox
Irma La Douce (1956)	Marguerite Monnot	Alexandre Breffort	Alexandre Breffort	Irma la Douce (1963)	Billy Wilder
Jersey Boys (2004)	Various	Various	Marshall Brickman; Rick Elice	Jersey Boys (2014)	Clint Eastwood
Jesus Christ Superstar (1971)	Andrew Lloyd Webber	Tim Rice	Tim Rice	Jesus Christ Superstar (1973)	Norman Jewison
Jumbo (1935)	Richard Rodgers	Lorenz Hart	Ben Hecht; Charles MacArthur	Billy Rose's Jumbo (1962)	Charles Walters
Joseph and the Amazing Technicolor Dreamcoat (1968)	Andrew Lloyd Webber	Tim Rice	Tim Rice	Joseph and the Amazing Technicolor Dreamcoat (1999)	David Mallet
Katips (2016)			Vincent M. Tañada	Katips (2021)	Vincent M. Tañada
Katyar Kaljat Ghusali (1967)			Purushottam Darvhekar	Katyar Kaljat Ghusali (2015)	Subodh Bhave
Kid Boots (1923)	Harry Tierney	Joseph McCarthy	William Anthony McGuire and Otto Harbach	Kid Boots (1926)	Frank Tuttle
The King and I (1951)	Richard Rodgers	Oscar Hammerstein II	Oscar Hammerstein II	The King and I (1956)	Walter Lang
The King and I (1951)	Richard Rodgers	Oscar Hammerstein II	Oscar Hammerstein II	The King and I (1999)	Richard Rich
Kismet (1953)	Alexander Borodin; Adapted by: Robert Wright; George Forrest	Robert Wright; George Forrest	Charles Lederer; Luther Davis	Kismet (1955)	Vincente Minnelli
Kiss Me, Kate (1948)	Cole Porter	Cole Porter	Bella and Samuel Spewack	Kiss Me Kate (1953)	George Sidney
Kiss Me, Kate (1948)	Cole Porter	Cole Porter	Bella and Samuel Spewack	Kiss Me Kate (1968)	Paul Bogart
Lady, Be Good (1924)	George Gershwin	Ira Gershwin	Guy Bolton; Fred Thompson	Lady Be Good (1928)	Richard Wallace
Lady, Be Good (1924)	George Gershwin	Ira Gershwin	Guy Bolton; Fred Thompson	Lady Be Good (1941)	Norman Z. McLeod
Lady in the Dark (1941)	Kurt Weill	Ira Gershwin	Moss Hart	Lady in the Dark (1944)	Mitchell Leisen
The Last Five Years (2001)	Jason Robert Brown	Jason Robert Brown	Jason Robert Brown	The Last Five Years (2014)	Richard LaGravenese
Let's Face It! (1941)	Cole Porter	Cole Porter	Herbert and Dorothy Fields	Let's Face It (1943)	Sidney Lanfield
Li'l Abner (1956)	Gene De Paul	Johnny Mercer	Norman Panama; Melvin Frank	Li'l Abner (1959)	Melvin Frank
Little Johnny Jones (1904)	George M. Cohan	George M. Cohan	George M. Cohan	Little Johnny Jones (1923)	Johnny Hines
Little Johnny Jones (1904)	George M. Cohan	George M. Cohan	George M. Cohan	Little Johnny Jones (1929)	Mervyn LeRoy
Little Nellie Kelly (1922)	George M. Cohan	George M. Cohan	George M. Cohan	Little Nellie Kelly (1940)	Norman Taurog
A Little Night Music (1973)	Stephen Sondheim	Stephen Sondheim	Hugh Wheeler	A Little Night Music (1977)	Harold Prince
Little Shop of Horrors (1982)	Alan Menken	Howard Ashman	Howard Ashman	Little Shop of Horrors (1986)	Frank Oz
La llamada (2013)	Alberto Jiménez	Alberto Jiménez	Javier Ambrossi; Javier Calvo	La llamada (2017)	Javier Ambrossi; Javier Calvo
London Road (2013)	Adam Cork	Alecky Blythe; Adam Cork	Alecky Blythe	London Road (2015)	Rufus Norris
Lost in the Stars (1949)	Kurt Weill	Maxwell Anderson	Maxwell Anderson	Lost in the Stars (1974)	Daniel Mann
Louisiana Purchase (1940)	Irving Berlin	Irving Berlin	Morrie Ryskind	Louisiana Purchase (1941)	Irving Cummings
Lucky Stiff (1988)	Stephen Flaherty	Lynn Ahrens	Lynn Ahrens	Lucky Stiff (2014)	Christopher Ashley
Mama, I Want to Sing! (1983)	Rudolph V. Hawkins, Wesley Naylor and Doris Troy	Vy Higginsen; Ken Wydro	Vy Higginsen; Ken Wydro	Mama, I Want to Sing! (2012)	Charles Randolph-Wright
Mame (1966)	Jerry Herman	Jerry Herman	Jerome Lawrence; Robert E. Lee	Mame (1974)	Gene Saks
Mamma Mia! (1999)	Benny Andersson; Björn Ulvaeus	Benny Andersson; Björn Ulvaeus	Catherine Johnson	Mamma Mia! (2008)	Phyllida Lloyd
Man of La Mancha (1965)	Mitch Leigh	Joe Darion	Dale Wasserman	Man of La Mancha (1972)	Arthur Hiller
Matilda the Musical (2010)	Tim Minchin	Tim Minchin	Dennis Kelly	Matilda the Musical (2022)	Matthew Warchus
Me and My Girl (1937)	Noel Gay	Douglas Furber; L. Arthur Rose	Douglas Furber; L. Arthur Rose	The Lambeth Walk (1939)	Albert de Courville
Mean Girls (2017)	Jeff Richmond	Nell Benjamin	Tina Fey	Mean Girls (2024)	Samantha Jayne; Arturo Perez Jr.
Mexican Hayride (1943)	Cole Porter	Cole Porter	Herbert Fields and Dorothy Fields	Mexican Hayride (1948)	Charles Barton
Les Misérables (1980)	Claude-Michel Schönberg	Alain Boublil; Jean-Marc Natel; Herbert Kretzmer	Alain Boublil; Claude-Michel Schönberg	Les Misérables (2012)	Tom Hooper
The Music Man (1957)	Meredith Willson	Meredith Willson	Meredith Willson; Franklin Lacey	The Music Man (1962)	Morton DaCosta
The Music Man (1957)	Meredith Willson	Meredith Willson	Meredith Willson; Franklin Lacey	The Music Man (2003)	Jeff Bleckner
My Fair Lady (1956)	Frederick Loewe	Alan Jay Lerner	Alan Jay Lerner	My Fair Lady (1964)	George Cukor
Nine (1982)	Maury Yeston	Maury Yeston	Arthur Kopit	Nine (2009)	Rob Marshall
No, No, Nanette (1925)	Vincent Youmans	Irving Caesar; Otto Harbach	Otto Harbach; Frank Mandel	No, No, Nanette (1930)	Clarence Badger
No, No, Nanette (1925)	Vincent Youmans	Irving Caesar; Otto Harbach	Otto Harbach; Frank Mandel	No, No, Nanette (1940)	Herbert Wilcox
No, No, Nanette (1925)	Vincent Youmans	Irving Caesar; Otto Harbach	Otto Harbach; Frank Mandel	Tea for Two (1950)	David Butler
Oh, Kay! (1926)	George Gershwin	Ira Gershwin	Guy Bolton; P. G. Wodehouse	Oh, Kay! (1928)	Mervyn LeRoy
Oh, Lady! Lady!! (1918)	Jerome Kern	P.G. Wodehouse	Guy Bolton; P.G. Wodehouse	Oh, Lady, Lady (1920)	Maurice S. Campbell
Oh, What a Lovely War! (1963)	Various	Various	Joan Littlewood and Theatre Workshop	Oh! What a Lovely War (1969)	Richard Attenborough
Oklahoma! (1943)	Richard Rodgers	Oscar Hammerstein II	Oscar Hammerstein II	Oklahoma (1955)	Fred Zinnemann
Oliver! (1960)	Lionel Bart	Lionel Bart	Lionel Bart	Oliver! (1968)	Carol Reed
On a Clear Day You Can See Forever (1960)	Burton Lane	Alan Jay Lerner	Alan Jay Lerner	On a Clear Day You Can See Forever (1965)	Vincente Minnelli
On the Town (1944)	Leonard Bernstein	Betty Comden; Adolph Green	Betty Comden; Adolph Green	On the Town (1949)	Gene Kelly; Stanley Donen
On Your Toes (1936)	Richard Rodgers	Lorenz Hart	Richard Rodgers; Lorenz Hart; George Abbott	On Your Toes (1939)	Ray Enright
Once Upon a Mattress (1958)	Mary Rodgers	Marshall Barer	Jay Thompson; Marshall Barer; Dean Fuller	Once Upon a Mattress (2005)	Kathleen Marshall
One Touch of Venus (1943)	Kurt Weill	Ogden Nash	Ogden Nash; S. J. Perelman	One Touch of Venus (1948)	William A. Seiter
Ópera do Malandro (1979)			Chico Buarque	Ópera do Malandro (1985)	Ruy Guerra
Paint Your Wagon (1951)	Frederick Loewe	Alan Jay Lerner	Alan Jay Lerner	Paint Your Wagon (1969)	Joshua Logan
The Pajama Game (1951)	Richard Adler; Jerry Ross	Richard Adler; Jerry Ross	George Abbott; Richard Bissell	The Pajama Game (1957)	George Abbott; Stanley Donen
Pal Joey (1940)	Richard Rodgers	Lorenz Hart	John O'Hara	Pal Joey (1957)	George Sidney
Paris (1928)	Cole Porter; Walter Kollo; Louis Alter	Cole Porter; E. Ray Goetz; Roy Turk	Martin Brown	Paris (1929)	Clarence G. Badger
The Phantom of the Opera (1986)	Andrew Lloyd Webber	Charles Hart; Richard Stilgoe (additional)	Richard Stilgoe; Andrew Lloyd Webber	The Phantom of the Opera (2004)	Joel Schumacher
Present Arms (1928)	Richard Rodgers	Lorenz Hart	Herbert Fields	Leathernecking (1930)	Edward F. Cline
The Producers (2001)	Mel Brooks	Mel Brooks	Mel Brooks; Thomas Meehan	The Producers (2005)	Susan Stroman
The Prom (2016)	Matthew Sklar	Chad Beguelin	Chad Beguelin; Bob Martin	The Prom (2020)	Ryan Murphy
Rain or Shine (1928)	Milton Ager; Owen Murphy	Jack Yellen	James Gleason; Maurice Marks	Rain or Shine (1930)	Frank Capra
Rainbow (1928)	Vincent Youmans	Oscar Hammerstein II	Laurence Stallings; Oscar Hammerstein II	Song of the West (1930)	Ray Enright
Reefer Madness (1998)	Dan Studney	Kevin Murphy	Dan Studney; Kevin Murphy	Reefer Madness: The Movie Musical (2005)	Andy Fickman
Rent (1996)	Jonathan Larson	Jonathan Larson	Jonathan Larson	Rent (2005)	Chris Columbus
Roberta (1933)	Jerome Kern	Otto Harbach	Otto Harbach	Roberta (1935)	William A. Seiter
Roberta (1933)	Jerome Kern	Otto Harbach	Otto Harbach	Lovely to Look At (1952)	Mervyn LeRoy
Rio Rita (1927)	Harry Tierney	Joseph McCarthy	Guy Bolton; Fred Thompson	Rio Rita (1929)	Luther Reed
Rio Rita (1927)	Harry Tierney	Joseph McCarthy	Guy Bolton; Fred Thompson	Rio Rita (1942)	S. Sylvan Simon
Rock of Ages (2005)	Various	Various	Chris D'Arienzo	Rock of Ages (2012)	Adam Shankman
The Rocky Horror Show (1973)	Richard O'Brien	Richard O'Brien	Richard O'Brien	The Rocky Horror Picture Show (1975)	Jim Sharman
The Rocky Horror Show (1973)	Richard O'Brien	Richard O'Brien	Richard O'Brien	The Rocky Horror Picture Show: Let's Do the Time Warp Again (2016)	Kenny Ortega
Rosalie (1928)	George Gershwin; Sigmund Romberg	Ira Gershwin; P. G. Wodehouse	William Anthony McGuire; Guy Bolton	Rosalie (1937)	W. S. Van Dyke
Rose-Marie (1924)	Rudolf Friml; Herbert Stothart	Otto Harbach; Oscar Hammerstein II	Otto Harbach; Oscar Hammerstein II	Rose-Marie (1928)	Lucien Hubbard
Rose-Marie (1924)	Rudolf Friml; Herbert Stothart	Otto Harbach; Oscar Hammerstein II	Otto Harbach; Oscar Hammerstein II	Rose Marie (1936)	W. S. Van Dyke
Rose-Marie (1924)	Rudolf Friml; Herbert Stothart	Otto Harbach; Oscar Hammerstein II	Otto Harbach; Oscar Hammerstein II	Rose Marie (1954)	Mervyn LeRoy
Sally (1920)	Jerome Kern; Victor Herbert	Clifford Grey; Buddy DeSylva; P. G. Wodehouse; Anne Caldwell	Guy Bolton	Sally (1925)	Alfred E. Green
Sally (1920)	Jerome Kern; Victor Herbert	Clifford Grey; Buddy DeSylva; P. G. Wodehouse; Anne Caldwell	Guy Bolton	Sally (1929)	John Francis Dillon
See My Lawyer (1939)	Alexander Haas		Richard Maibaum; Harry Clork	See My Lawyer (1945)	Edward F. Cline
Shinbone Alley (1957)	George Kleinsinger	Joe Darion	Joe Darion; Mel Brooks	Shinbone Alley (1970)	John David Wilson
Show Boat (1927)	Jerome Kern	Oscar Hammerstein II	Oscar Hammerstein II	Show Boat (1929)	Harry A. Pollard
Show Boat (1927)	Jerome Kern	Oscar Hammerstein II	Oscar Hammerstein II	Show Boat (1936)	James Whale
Show Boat (1927)	Jerome Kern	Oscar Hammerstein II	Oscar Hammerstein II	Show Boat (1951)	George Sidney
Something for the Boys (1943)	Cole Porter	Cole Porter	Herbert Fields; Dorothy Fields	Something for the Boys (1944)	Lewis Seiler
The Sound of Music (1959)	Richard Rodgers	Oscar Hammerstein II	Howard Lindsay; Russel Crouse	The Sound of Music (1965)	Robert Wise
South Pacific (1949)	Richard Rodgers	Oscar Hammerstein II	Oscar Hammerstein II; Joshua Logan	South Pacific (1958)	Joshua Logan
South Pacific (1949)	Richard Rodgers	Oscar Hammerstein II	Oscar Hammerstein II; Joshua Logan	South Pacific (2001)	Richard Pearce
Sporting Love (1934)	Billy Mayerl	Desmond Carter; Frank Eyton	Stanley Lupino	Sporting Love (1936)	J. Elder Wills
Spring Is Here (1929)	Richard Rodgers	Lorenz Hart	Owen Davis	Spring Is Here (1930)	John Francis Dillon
Stop the World – I Want to Get Off (1961)	Leslie Bricusse; Anthony Newley	Leslie Bricusse; Anthony Newley	Leslie Bricusse; Anthony Newley	Stop the World – I Want to Get Off (1966)	Philip Saville
Strike! (2005)	Danny Schur	Danny Schur	Danny Schur; Rick Chafe	Stand! (2019)	Robert Adetuyi
Sunny (1925)	Jerome Kern	Oscar Hammerstein II; Otto Harbach	Oscar Hammerstein II; Otto Harbach	Sunny (1930)	William A. Seiter
Sunny (1925)	Jerome Kern	Oscar Hammerstein II; Otto Harbach	Oscar Hammerstein II; Otto Harbach	Sunny (1941)	Herbert Wilcox
Sunshine on Leith (1979)	The Proclaimers	The Proclaimers	Stephen Greenhorn	Sunshine on Leith (2013)	Dexter Fletcher
Sweeney Todd: The Demon Barber of Fleet Street (1979)	Stephen Sondheim	Stephen Sondheim	Hugh Wheeler	Sweeney Todd: The Demon Barber of Fleet Street (2007)	Tim Burton
Sweet Adeline (1929)	Jerome Kern	Oscar Hammerstein II	Oscar Hammerstein II	Sweet Adeline (1934)	Mervyn LeRoy
Sweet Charity (1966)	Cy Coleman	Dorothy Fields	Neil Simon	Sweet Charity (1969)	Bob Fosse
Sybil (1916)	Victor Jacobi	Harry Graham; Harry B. Smith	Harry Graham; Harry B. Smith	The Duchess of Buffalo (1926)	Sidney Franklin
Take a Chance (1932)	Nacio Herb Brown; Richard A. Whiting; Vincent Youmans	Buddy DeSylva	Buddy DeSylva and Laurence Schwab	Take a Chance (1933)	Monte Brice
This Is The Army (1942)	Irving Berlin	Irving Berlin	James McColl	This Is The Army (1943)	Michael Curtiz
The Threepenny Opera (1928)	Kurt Weill	Bertolt Brecht	Bertolt Brecht	The Threepenny Opera (1931)	G. W. Pabst
The Threepenny Opera (1928)	Kurt Weill	Bertolt Brecht	Bertolt Brecht	The Threepenny Opera (1963)	Wolfgang Staudte
The Threepenny Opera (1928)	Kurt Weill	Bertolt Brecht	Bertolt Brecht	Mack the Knife (1989)	Menahem Golan
Tick, Tick... BOOM! (1990)	Jonathan Larson	Jonathan Larson	Jonathan Larson	Tick, Tick... BOOM! (2021)	Lin-Manuel Miranda
The Time, the Place and the Girl (1907)	Joseph E. Howard		Frank R. Adams; William M. Hough	The Time, the Place and the Girl (1930)	Howard Bretherton
Too Many Girls (1939)	Richard Rodgers	Lorenz Hart	George Marion Jr.	Too Many Girls (1940)	George Abbott
Top Banana (1951)	Johnny Mercer	Johnny Mercer	Hy Kraft	Top Banana (1954)	Alfred E. Green
Top Speed (1929)	Harry Ruby	Bert Kalmar	Guy Bolton; Harry Ruby; Bert Kalmar	Top Speed (1930)	Mervyn LeRoy
Under Your Hat (1939)			Arthur Macrae	Under Your Hat (1940)	Maurice Elvey
The Unsinkable Molly Brown (1960)	Meredith Willson	Meredith Willson	Richard Morris	The Unsinkable Molly Brown (1964)	Charles Walters
Up in Central Park (1945)	Sigmund Romberg	Dorothy Fields	Herbert Fields; Dorothy Fields	Up in Central Park (1948)	William A. Seiter
Very Warm for May (1939)	Jerome Kern	Oscar Hammerstein II	Oscar Hammerstein II	Broadway Rhythm (1944)	Roy Del Ruth
Waitress (2015)	Sara Bareilles	Sara Bareilles	Jessie Nelson	Waitress: The Musical (2023)	Brett Sullivan (live film); Diane Paulus (stage)
West Side Story (1957)	Leonard Bernstein	Stephen Sondheim	Arthur Laurents	West Side Story (1961)	Robert Wise; Jerome Robbins
West Side Story (1957)	Leonard Bernstein	Stephen Sondheim	Arthur Laurents	West Side Story (2021)	Steven Spielberg
Where's Charley? (1948)	Frank Loesser	Frank Loesser	George Abbott	Where's Charley? (1952)	David Butler
Whoopee! (1928)	Walter Donaldson	Gus Kahn	William Anthony McGuire	Whoopee! (1930)	Thornton Freeland
Wicked (2003)	Stephen Schwartz	Stephen Schwartz	Winnie Holzman	Wicked film series: Wicked (2024); Wicked: For Good (2025)	Jon M. Chu
The Wiz (1974)	Charlie Smalls; Timothy Graphenreed; Harold Wheeler; George Faison; Luther Vandross	Charlie Smalls; Zachary Walzer; Luther Vandross	William F. Brown	The Wiz (1978)	Sidney Lumet
Die Wunderbar (1930)	Robert Katscher		Geza Herczeg; Karl Farkas	Wonder Bar (1934)	Lloyd Bacon

== See also ==
- Film adaptation
- Musical film
- Operetta films
- Lists of film source material
- List of films based on operas
