= Shadow of a Doubt (1991 film) =

- Genre: Psychological thriller
- Based on: Shadow of a Doubt by: Thornton Wilder; Sally Benson; Alma Reville; Gordon McDonell
- Screenplay by: John Gay
- Directed by: Karen Arthur
- Starring: Mark Harmon; Margaret Welsh; Diane Ladd
- Music by: Allyn Ferguson
- Country of origin: United States
- Original language: English

Production
- Executive producer: Norman Rosemont
- Producer: David A. Rosemont
- Cinematography: Thomas Neuwirth
- Editor: Scott Vickrey
- Running time: 96 minutes
- Production companies: Hallmark Hall of Fame Productions; Rosemont Productions; Universal Television

Original release
- Network: CBS
- Release: April 28, 1991

Shadow of a Doubt is a 1991 American psychological thriller television film directed by Karen Arthur. A remake of Alfred Hitchcock's 1943 film, John Gay's teleplay, based on the screenplay by Thornton Wilder, Sally Benson and Alma Reville, follows a young woman (Margaret Welsh) who gradually discovers that her beloved uncle (Mark Harmon) is in fact a serial murderer. It aired on CBS on April 28, 1991, as an episode of the Hallmark Hall of Fame series.

== Cast ==
- Mark Harmon as Charles Spencer
- Margaret Welsh as Charlotte 'Charlie' Newton
- Diane Ladd as Emma Newton
- Tippi Hedren as Teresa Mathewson
- Shirley Knight as Helen Potter
- Norm Skaggs as Gary Graham
- Mosiah Seth Smith
- William Lanteau

== Production ==
The film was shot in Santa Rosa, California and the nearby city Petaluma, the same setting as the original. Writer John Gay added a new opening scene where Uncle Charlie seduces and murders widow Terese Mathewson. "When you look at the original film, 10 minutes into it there isn't any doubt that Uncle Charlie is the killer," said Gay. "Since there isn't any doubt to begin with, the drama is in the girl's reaction and the family's reaction to Uncle Charlie. So I thought it would be interesting to see him do this thing."

== See also ==
- Remakes of films by Alfred Hitchcock
