= The Haunting of Helen Walker =

1995 American television film

- Genre: Horror thriller
- Based on: The Turn of the Screw by Henry James
- Teleplay by: Hugh Whitemore
- Directed by: Tom McLoughlin
- Starring: Valerie Bertinelli; Florence Hoath; Aled Roberts; Michael Gough; Paul Rhys; Christopher Guard; Diana Rigg
- Music by: Allyn Ferguson
- Country of origin: United States
- Original language: English

Production
- Executive producers: Norman Rosemont; David A. Rosemont
- Producers: Nick Gillott; Tom McLoughlin
- Production location: England
- Cinematography: Tony Imi
- Editor: Charles Bornstein
- Running time: 88 minutes
- Production company: Rosemont Productions

Original release
- Network: CBS
- Release: December 3, 1995

The Haunting of Helen Walker is a 1995 American horror thriller television film based on the 1898 novella The Turn of the Screw by Henry James. It was directed by Tom McLoughlin, written by Hugh Whitemore, and stars Valerie Bertinelli, Florence Hoath, Aled Roberts, Michael Gough, Paul Rhys, Christopher Guard, and Diana Rigg. It aired on CBS on December 3, 1995.

== Cast ==
- Valerie Bertinelli as Helen Walker
- Florence Hoath as Flora Goffe
- Aled Roberts as Miles Goffe
- Michael Gough as Barnaby
- Paul Rhys as Edward Goffe
- Christopher Guard as Peter Quint
- Diana Rigg as Mrs. Grose
- Elizabeth Morton as Miss Jessel
- Tricia Thorns as Peggy
- Aisling Flitton as Connie
- Flip Webster as Alice
- Mark Longhurst as Luke

== Reception ==
The film was seen by 13.6 million when it premiered.
