= The Court-Martial of George Armstrong Custer =

- Genre: Alternate history; Historical drama
- Based on: The Court-Martial of George Armstrong Custer by Douglas C. Jones
- Teleplay by: John Gay
- Directed by: Glenn Jordan
- Starring: Brian Keith; Blythe Danner; Ken Howard; James Olson
- Music by: Jack Elliott
- Country of origin: United States
- Original language: English

Production
- Producer: Norman Rosemont
- Cinematography: Jim Kilgore
- Editor: Barney Robinson
- Running time: 74 minutes
- Production company: Warner Bros. Television

Original release
- Network: NBC
- Release: December 1, 1977

The Court-Martial of George Armstrong Custer is a 1977 American historical drama television film directed by Glenn Jordan and written by John Gay. Based on the 1976 novel by Douglas C. Jones, the film portrays an alternate history in which United States Army officer George Armstrong Custer is the sole survivor of the Battle of the Little Bighorn in 1876, and is court-martialed for the deaths of his soldiers there. It stars Brian Keith, Blythe Danner, Ken Howard, and James Olson.

The film aired on NBC on December 1, 1977, as an episode of Hallmark Hall of Fame. The Los Angeles Times called it "marvellous drama".

== Cast ==
- Brian Keith as Allan Jacobson
- Blythe Danner as Elizabeth Bacon Custer
- Ken Howard as Asa Bird Gardiner
- James Olson as George Armstrong Custer
- Stephen Elliott as John Schofield
- Richard Dysart as President Grant
- Nicolas Coster as Philip Sheridan
- William Daniels as Marcus Reno

== See also ==
- The Trial of Lee Harvey Oswald (1964 film)
- The Trial of Lee Harvey Oswald (1977 film)
