= The Corsican Brothers (1985 film) =

1985 American adventure television film

- Genre: Adventure
- Based on: The Corsican Brothers by Alexandre Dumas
- Written by: Robin Miller
- Directed by: Ian Sharp
- Starring: Trevor Eve; Geraldine Chaplin; Olivia Hussey; Nicholas Clay; Jean Marsh; Benedict Taylor; Simon Ward; Donald Pleasence
- Music by: Allyn Ferguson
- Country of origin: United States
- Original language: English

Production
- Executive producer: Norman Rosemont
- Producer: David A. Rosemont
- Cinematography: Frank Watts
- Editors: Alan Patillo (sup); David Spiers
- Running time: 100 minutes
- Production companies: Hallmark Hall of Fame Productions; Rosemont Productions

Original release
- Network: CBS
- Release: February 5, 1985

The Corsican Brothers is a 1985 American adventure television film based on the 1844 novella by Alexandre Dumas. It was directed by Ian Sharp, and stars Trevor Eve, Geraldine Chaplin, Olivia Hussey, Nicholas Clay, Jean Marsh, Benedict Taylor, Simon Ward, and Donald Pleasence. It aired on CBS on February 5, 1985, as an episode of the Hallmark Hall of Fame series.

== Plot ==
The de Franchi family is locked in a deadly vendetta with the de Giudici family in 19th century Corsica. Lucien and Louis de Franchi are twin brothers. Lucien wants to continue Corsican traditions, while Louis wants to end the vendetta and declare peace. Both brothers are in love with Annamaria de Giudice.

== Cast ==
- Trevor Eve as Louis de Franchi / Lucien de Franchi
- Geraldine Chaplin as Madame De Franchi
- Olivia Hussey as Annamaria De Giudice
- Nicholas Clay as Giordano Martelli
- Jean Marsh as Mazzere
- Benedict Taylor as Georges Du Caillaud
- Simon Ward as Duc Dechateau Renaud
- Donald Pleasence as Chancellor
- James Hazeldine as Vincente De Franchi
- Patsy Kensit-Healy as Emilie Du Caillaud
- Margaret Tyzack as Madame De Giudice
- Mark Ryan as Bernardo De Giudice

== Production ==
The lead role was originally meant to be played by Pierce Brosnan, then best known for Remington Steele. However he read the script for the feature film Nomads and decided to make that instead. It turned out that Corsican producer Norman Rosemont was unable to accommodate Brosnan's limited schedule.

Instead the producers cast Trevor Eve, who several CBS executives had seen on stage in London.

The film was shot in Aix-en-Provence and the south of France hill village of Cipieres.

Star Trevor Eve said "Lucien was the hunter. I played him as a rough, tough kid. The kind who as a boy yelled a lot and developed a hoarseness in his voice. He dressed roughly and wore the same clothes every day. His hair was wild and was never washed. Louis was more cerebral and refined. He was better groomed. It was easier to play Lucien. You could flop out of bed in the morning and go to the set without brushing your hair."

== Reception ==
The New York Times called it "giddy escapist hookum" which "nevertheless skillfully recaptures the flavour and rhythms of old-time Technicolor words-and-daggers romps".

The Chicago Tribune said the film "has an old-fashioned look and a few drawbacks. Its sword play rings of clashing steel, but its dialogue has the clunk of wood, despite the best efforts of a sterling cast."
