= Kismet (1967 film) =

1967 American television film

- Written by: Sidney Michaels; Charles Lederer; Luther Davis
- Directed by: Bob Henry
- Starring: José Ferrer; Barbara Eden; Anna Maria Alberghetti
- Country of origin: United States
- Original language: English

Production
- Executive producer: James Loren
- Producer: Norman Rosemont
- Editor: James E. Brady
- Running time: 90 minutes
- Production company: ABC

Original release
- Network: ABC
- Release: October 24, 1967

Kismet is a 1967 American TV film. It is an adaptation of the musical Kismet directed by Bob Henry.

== Cast ==
- Jose Ferrer as Hajj
- Anna Maria Alberghetti as Marsinah
- George Chakiris as Caliph Abdullah
- Barbara Eden as Lalume
- Cecil Kellaway as Omar
- Hans Conried as The Wazir Mansur

== Production ==
It was produced by Norman Rosemont, who had produced the stage musical TV adaptations Brigadoon (1966) and Carousel (1967). He cast Ferrer after seeing him on stage in Man of La Mancha. It was one of the few musicals Chakiris appeared in during the 1960s despite his success in West Side Story.

== Reception ==
The Christian Science Monitor called it "solid cotton candy."
