= The Christmas Gift =

American television film

- Genre: Christmas drama
- Teleplay by: Jeb Rosebrook; Christopher Grabenstein; Ronald Venable
- Story by: Christopher Grabenstein; Ronald Venable
- Directed by: Michael Pressman
- Starring: John Denver; Jane Kaczmarek; Edward Winter; Pat Corley; Kurtwood Smith
- Music by: Allyn Ferguson
- Country of origin: United States
- Original language: English

Production
- Executive producer: Norman Rosemont
- Producer: David A. Rosemont
- Cinematography: John Coquillon
- Editor: J. P. Farrell
- Running time: 120 minutes
- Production companies: Rosemont Productions International; Sunn Classic Pictures

Original release
- Network: CBS
- Release: December 21, 1986

The Christmas Gift is a 1986 American Christmas drama television film directed by Michael Pressman and starring John Denver. It was Denver's first acting role since Oh, God! (1977).

Denver said he took the role "because it was the perfect opportunity to ease back into acting; it is a light, warm tale of human relationships. I waited for something that I felt really good about and turned down a lot of scripts over the years. I've been very picky about acting projects and, in retrospect, I made a big mistake a few years ago when I turned down the Zack Mayo role (played by Richard Gere) in An Officer and a Gentleman. It was mostly due to my naivete – I couldn't envision the final product from the initial script."

== Plot ==
A widowed New York City architect and his young daughter take a Christmas vacation and end up in a small mystical town in Colorado where everyone believes in Santa Claus.

== Cast ==
- John Denver – George Billings
- Jane Kaczmarek – Susan MacMillen
- Gennie James – Alexandra "Alex" Billings
- Edward Winter – Thomas A. Renfield
- Pat Corley – Bud Sawyer
- Mary Wickes – Henrietta "Aunt Henny" Sawyer
- Kurtwood Smith – Jake Richards
- James T. Callahan – Robert "Bob" Truesdale
- Anne Haney – Clara Huckle
- Harvey Vernon – Hank Huckle

== See also ==
- List of Christmas films
