= The Man in the Iron Mask (1977 film) =

American television film

- Based on: The Vicomte of Bragelonne by Alexandre Dumas
- Screenplay by: William Bast
- Directed by: Mike Newell
- Starring: Richard Chamberlain; Jenny Agutter; Patrick McGoohan; Ralph Richardson; Louis Jourdan; Ian Holm; Hugh Fraser
- Theme music composer: Allyn Ferguson
- Country of origin: United States
- Original language: English

Production
- Producer: Norman Rosemont
- Cinematography: Freddie Young
- Editor: Bill Blunden
- Running time: 100 minutes

Original release
- Release: January 17, 1977

The Man in the Iron Mask is a 1977 television film directed by Mike Newell, loosely adapted from the 1847–1850 novel The Vicomte de Bragelonne by Alexandre Dumas and presenting several plot similarities with the 1939 film adaptation. Produced by Norman Rosemont for ITC Entertainment, it stars Richard Chamberlain as King Louis XIV and his twin Philippe, Patrick McGoohan as Nicolas Fouquet, Ralph Richardson as Jean-Baptiste Colbert, Louis Jourdan as D'Artagnan, and Ian Holm as the Chevalier Duval, with Jenny Agutter playing Louis XIV's mistress Louise de la Vallière, and Vivien Merchant as Queen Marie-Therese.

== Plot ==
In this version, the twins' ages are swapped. Philippe is the firstborn and rightful king, who had been spirited away at birth and raised with no knowledge of his true identity in a plot by Cardinal Mazarin to manipulate Louis before his own death. Colbert and D'Artagnan plot to replace Louis (who is an ineffective king more interested in dancing and pleasure than the welfare of France) with Philippe, and in the process bring down the corrupt finance minister Fouquet, who has embezzled from the national treasury. Louis is repulsed by his own wife and makes repeated advances on Louise, who is in turn repulsed by him yet falls in love with Philippe.

== Cast ==
- Richard Chamberlain as King Louis XIV/Philippe
- Jenny Agutter as Louise de La Vallière, Louis XIV's mistress
- Patrick McGoohan as Nicolas Fouquet
- Ralph Richardson as Jean-Baptiste Colbert
- Louis Jourdan as D'Artagnan
- Ian Holm as the Chevalier Duval
- Hugh Fraser as Montfleury
- Brenda Bruce as Queen Anne of Austria
- Vivien Merchant as Queen Marie-Therese

== Production ==
Although a made-for-TV movie, actual locations in France were used for filming, including the Château de Fontainebleau and Fouquet's actual chateau of Vaux-le-Vicomte for the final ball scene.
