= Ivanhoe (1982 film) =

1982 film by Douglas Camfield

- Genre: Adventure; Drama; Epic; Historical; Romance
- Based on: Ivanhoe by Sir Walter Scott
- Written by: John Gay
- Directed by: Douglas Camfield
- Starring: Anthony Andrews; Sam Neill; Michael Hordern; James Mason; Olivia Hussey
- Music by: Allyn Ferguson
- Countries of origin: United Kingdom; United States
- Original language: English

Production
- Producer: Norman Rosemont
- Cinematography: John Coquillon
- Editor: Bill Blunden
- Running time: 142 minutes
- Production companies: Rosemont Productions; Columbia Pictures Television

Original release
- Network: CBS
- Release: 23 February 1982
- Network: ITV
- Release: 26 September 1982

Related
- Ivanhoe (1952 film); Ivanhoe (1958 TV series)

Ivanhoe is a 1982 historical romance television film directed by Douglas Camfield, with a screenplay written by John Gay. An adaptation of Walter Scott's 1819 novel of the same name, it stars Anthony Andrews in the title role and depicts the noble knight Ivanhoe returning home from the Third Crusade and becoming involved in a power struggle for the throne of England.

Brian de Bois-Guilbert is treated more ambiguously than in most versions of the story. He develops some genuine affection for Rebecca of York towards the end, and although he could easily have won the fight against the wounded and weakened Wilfred of Ivanhoe, Brian de Bois-Guilbert lowers his sword and allows himself to be killed, thus saving Rebecca's life.

== Plot summary ==
Upon returning from the Crusades, Ivanhoe, Robin Hood and the Saxons work to restore King Richard to the throne with opposition from Prince John, his Norman knights, and the Knights Templar.

== Cast ==
- Anthony Andrews – Sir Wilfred of Ivanhoe, Cedric's son.
- Sam Neill – Sir Brian de Bois-Guilbert
- Michael Hordern – Lord Cedric of Rotherwood
- James Mason – Isaac of York, Jewish money-lender.
- Olivia Hussey – Rebecca of York, Isaac's daughter.
- Lysette Anthony – Lady Rowena, Cedric's ward.
- Julian Glover – King Richard I Plantagenet, the Black Knight.
- Ronald Pickup – Prince John Plantagenet, Richard's brother and usurper.
- John Rhys-Davies – Sir Reginald Front-de-Boeuf
- Stuart Wilson – Sir Maurice de Bracy
- George Innes – Wamba (son of Witless), Cedric's jester.
- David Robb – Robert of Locksley, Robin Hood.
- Tony Haygarth – Friar Tuck.
- Michael Gothard – Sir Athelstane of Coningsburgh
- Philip Locke – Lucas de Beaumanoir, Grand Master of the Knights Templar.
- Timothy Morand – Prince John's Attendant
- Kevin Stoney – Fitzurse, Prince John's advisor.
- Dean Harris – Phillippe
- John Hallam – Herald
- Kenneth Gilbert – Marshall
- Debbie Farrington – Alicia
- Stewart Bevan – Edward, member of the Order of the Knights Templar.
- Geoffrey Beevers – Beaslin (as Geoffrey Veevers)
- John Forgeham – Front-de-Boeuf's Lieutenant
- Chloe Franks – Attendant
- Robert Russell – Leader
- Derek Lyons – Squire

== Production ==
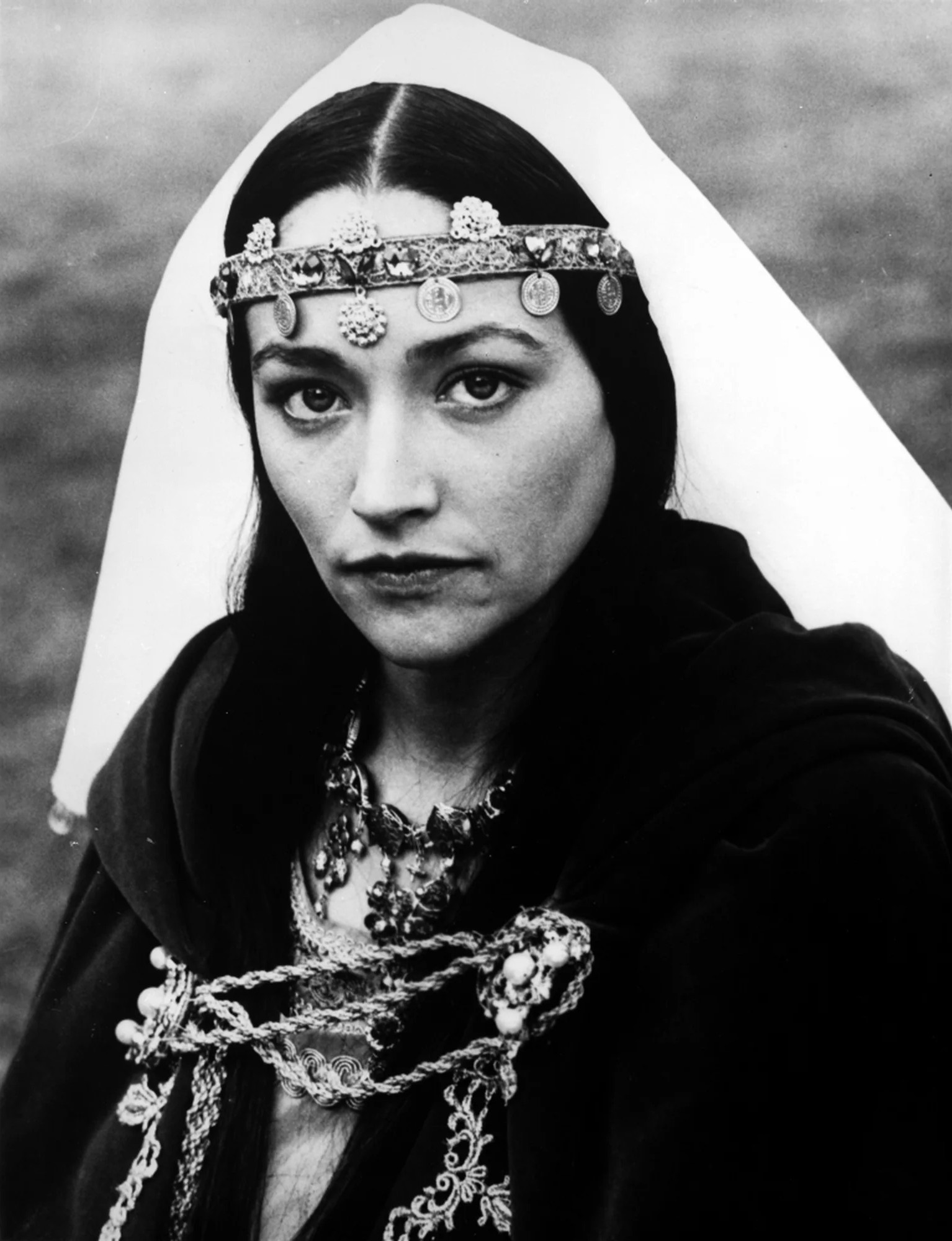
Olivia Hussey as Rebecca of York

The film was part of a slate of films from Columbia Pictures Television then under Herman Rush. Anthony Andrews' casting was announced in September 1981. "It's impossible to make Ivanhoe without being a bit tongue in cheek," said Andrews.

Michael Hordern said, "You could change our costumes from 12th Century to 20th Century and have us running about in automobiles instead of on horseback, and you could do the same story in terms of (anti-semitism). Prejudice is still very strong. Human nature doesn't seem to have changed very much since Cedric's time."

It was filmed at Pinewood Studios and the historic Bamburgh Castle and Alnwick Castle in Northumberland.

"The problem with Ivanhoe is that he is whiter than white, cleaner than clean", said Andrews. "He's a straight-cut hero with no rough edge. Each time he opens his mouth, he says something incredibly just. The problem was to turn him into a human being."

Julian Glover had played the role of Richard I previously in the Doctor Who serial The Crusade (1965), which was also directed by Camfield.

== Broadcast and reception ==
The film premiered on CBS in the US on 23 February 1982 and was first broadcast in the UK on 26 September 1982 on ITV.

In Sweden, where it first aired over TV 1 on 31 December 1982, the film's airing annually around Christmas–New Year has become a tradition. Since 1994 the movie has been broadcast on Swedish television at 3 PM on New Year’s Day. Popular Swedish heavy metal band HammerFall named their debut album Glory to the Brave after a line from the film.

The score by Allyn Ferguson was nominated for an Emmy Award in 1982.

== See also ==
- List of American films of 1982
