= The Last Days of Patton =

1986 film directed by Delbert Mann

- Genre: Biography; Drama
- Based on: The Last Days of Patton by Ladislas Farago
- Written by: William Luce
- Directed by: Delbert Mann
- Starring: George C. Scott; Eva Marie Saint; Murray Hamilton; Ed Lauter; Richard Dysart
- Theme music composer: Allyn Ferguson
- Country of origin: United States
- Original language: English

Production
- Executive producer: Robert E. Fuisz
- Producers: Alfred R. Kelman; William F. Storke
- Production locations: Wandsworth Town Hall, Wandsworth High Street, Wandsworth, London, England; Harlaxton Manor, Harlaxton, Lincolnshire, England
- Cinematography: Dennis C. Lewiston
- Editor: Bill Blunden
- Running time: 146 minutes
- Production company: Entertainment Partners

Original release
- Network: CBS
- Release: September 14, 1986

Related
- Patton

The Last Days of Patton is a 1986 American made-for-television biographical drama film and sequel to the 1970 film Patton, portraying the last few months of the general's life. George C. Scott reprises the role of General George S. Patton, and Eva Marie Saint portrays Beatrice Patton, the general's wife. It was directed by Delbert Mann.

== Plot ==
As a result of General George S. Patton's (George C. Scott) decision to use former Nazis to help reconstruct post-World War II occupied Germany (and publicly defending the practice), General Dwight Eisenhower (Richard Dysart) removes him from that task and reassigns him to supervise "an army of clerks" whose task is to write the official history of the U.S. military involvement in World War II.

Shortly thereafter, on December 9, 1945 (a day before he was to transfer back to the United States), Patton is involved in an automobile accident that seriously injures his spinal column, paralyzing him. As he lies in his hospital bed, he flashes back to earlier pivotal moments in his life, including stories his father told him of his grandfather's service during the American Civil War which inspired him to attend the United States Military Academy at West Point, his marriage to his wife Beatrice (Eva Marie Saint), and his championing of the use of tanks in the United States Army.

President Harry S. Truman and other government officials, not wanting Patton to die on German soil, orders that he be transferred to a stateside hospital. Preparations, including a full plaster body cast, are made, but Patton dies of an embolism on December 21, 1945.

== Cast ==
- George C. Scott as General George S. Patton
- Eva Marie Saint as Beatrice Patton
- Murray Hamilton as Brigadier General Hobart "Hap" Gay
- Ed Lauter as Lieutenant Colonel (Doctor) Paul Hill
- Richard Dysart as General of the Army Dwight D. Eisenhower
- Kathryn Leigh Scott as Jean Gordon (Red Cross), Beatrice Patton's niece and the general's onetime mistress.
- Ron Berglas as Lieutenant George S. Patton
- Horst Janson as Baron Von Wangenheim
- Daniel Benzali as Colonel Glen Spurling
- Don Fellows as Lieutenant General Walter Bedell Smith
- Errol John as Sergeant 1st Class George Meeks
- Alan MacNaughton as Brigadier General (Doctor) Hugh Cairns
- Paul Maxwell as Lieutenant General Geoffrey Keyes
- Lee Patterson as Colonel Paul Harkins
- Shane Rimmer as Colonel (Doctor) Lawrence Ball
- Michael Domenico as 8-year-old George S. Patton
- Keith Edwards as George S. Patton Sr.
- Oscar Quitak as Fritz Schäffer

== Awards and nominations ==
Year	Award	Category	Nominee(s)	Result
1987	39th Primetime Emmy Awards	Outstanding Achievement in Makeup for a Miniseries or a Special	Del Acevedo, Eddie Knight, and Alan Boyle	Won
1987	39th Primetime Emmy Awards	Outstanding Achievement in Music Composition for a Miniseries or a Special	Allyn Ferguson	Nominated
