= Les Misérables (1978 film) =

1978 British television film

- Genre: History; Drama
- Based on: Les Misérables by Victor Hugo
- Written by: John Gay
- Directed by: Glenn Jordan
- Starring: Richard Jordan; Anthony Perkins; Angela Pleasence; Caroline Langrishe; Christopher Guard; Ian Holm; Caroline Blakiston
- Music by: Allyn Ferguson
- Country of origin: United Kingdom
- Original language: English

Production
- Producer: Norman Rosemont
- Cinematography: Jean Tournier
- Editor: Bill Blunden
- Running time: 150 minutes (original broadcast); 137 minutes (video release)
- Production company: ITC

Original release
- Network: CBS
- Release: 27 December 1978

Les Misérables is a 1978 British made-for-television film adaptation of the 1862 novel of the same name by Victor Hugo. The film was written by John Gay, produced by Lew Grade, and directed by Glenn Jordan. The film originally aired on US television on CBS on 27 December 1978.

== Plot ==
The plot follows the general outline of the novel of the same name, omitting many details and some entire episodes. The narrative is strictly chronological and avoids the digressions required to mirror the novel's structure. Many of the novel's minor characters do not appear or are combined. For example, the role of the Thénardiers is reduced to a scene in which Valjean ransoms Cosette from them.

The film begins with Jean Valjean's theft and then lingers in the Toulon prison where his mistreatment is detailed under the gaze of Javert, who witnesses Valjean's amazing feat of strength in rescuing a man crushed under a boulder. Valjean escapes when saving another convict who had fallen while repairing some battlements. Struggling to survive, he encounters a kindly Bishop, who feeds and shelters him. He steals silver plates from the Bishop. When Valjean is arrested and brought back to the Bishop, the Bishop pretends the silver pieces were a gift, dismisses the police, and gives Valjean two silver candlesticks in addition to what he had originally stolen. Valjean is overcome. The Bishop tells him he has purchased his soul for God and that his life will now be different.

Valjean becomes a prosperous businessman using techniques for the manufacture of black beads that he learned in Toulon and becomes mayor of his town under the name Madeleine. Javert arrives to serve as chief of the local police. He thinks he recognizes Madeleine and notes his use of the Toulon manufacturing method. Madeleine rescues the beggar Fantine, who recounts her history in a few sentences, when Javert is about to punish her, and Javert witnesses Madeleine rescue a man trapped beneath a cart, another astonishing feat of strength. Javert denounces Madeleine to his superiors, but before they can confirm Madeleine is actually Valjean, another man is arrested and charged in Arras with being the escaped convict Valjean. Javert confesses his actions to Madeleine and asks to be dismissed from his position. Madeleine refuses his request and goes to Arras where he wins the release of the falsely accused man by identifying himself as Valjean.

Valjean returns to his town and tries to help the dying Fantine while he awaits arrest. He learns how the Thénardiers are caring for her daughter Cosette. Javert insists on arresting him, Fantine dies, and Valjean escapes. He ransoms Cosette from the Thénardiers and gives her a doll. Living in Paris with Cosette, Valjean escapes from Javert, who is directing police searches of the district where he is living, by climbing a wall, landing in the garden of a Paris convent. The gardener is the man he rescued from being crushed under a cart, who agrees to pretend he and Valjean are brothers and recommends him to the nuns as a gardener. Cosette attends the convent school. When she completes her education and has become a young woman, Valjean decides they should leave the convent's cloistered premises so she can experience the world.

Valjean and Cosette are strolling in a public garden and pause to listen to radicals denounce the government. Cosette and Marius, one of the radical group though not a speaker, see one another and their eyes lock. Marius pays the urchin Gavroche to tail them and report their address to him. Marius soon romances Cosette through the entrance gate to their home. Valjean sees this and abruptly announces to Cosette that they must leave for England. When Marius learns this, he visits his grandfather, Gillenormand, who detests his radical activities, to ask for money. Instead his grandfather suggests he make the woman he wants to marry his mistress and Marius, repulsed by the suggestion, leaves.

The radicals have created a barricade and are exchanging gunfire with the military. Gavroche identifies a man on the radical side of the barricade as the undercover police infiltrator, Javert. Enjolras arrests Javert and promises to shoot him if the barricade falls to the government's forces. Marius sends Gavroche with a message for Cosette, which Valjean reads. Valjean goes to the barricade and tries to talk Marius into abandoning the radicals. Gavroche is shot by the soldiers and dies. Valjean asks Enjolras for the privilege of killing Javert, which Enjolras grants him. Valjean instead releases him, repeating the words of the Bishop that his soul was once purchased for God. When Marius is wounded, Valjean escapes carrying his limp body with him through the sewers. Javert pursues him there and confronts him about their earlier encounter. Javert prepares to kill Valjean but suddenly disappears into the darkness of the sewers. He commits suicide by jumping into the Seine. The film ends with the wedding of Cosette and Marius, attended only by Valjean and Gillenormand.

== Cast ==
- Richard Jordan as Jean Valjean
- Anthony Perkins as Javert
- Angela Pleasence as Fantine
- Caroline Langrishe as Cosette
  - Joanna Price as young Cosette
- Christopher Guard as Marius
- Ian Holm as Thénardier
- Caroline Blakiston as Madame Thénardier
- Timothy Morand as Enjolras
- Dexter Fletcher as Gavroche
- Cyril Cusack as Fauchelevent
- Claude Dauphin as Bishop Myriel
- John Gielgud as Gillenormand
- Celia Johnson as Sister Simplice
- Joyce Redman as Magliore
- Flora Robson as The Prioress

== Production ==
Lynne Frederick heavily campaigned for the role of Cosette. When she auditioned, she also read for the role of Fantine. She was ultimately deemed too old to play Cosette and too young to play Fantine.

The film was produced by Norman Rosemont who specialised in period adaptations of classic novels for television. He found it difficult to raise financing for the first few and spent two years raising the money for Les Miserables. NBC turned it down out of fear Americans would not understand the title. Eventually money was raised from CBS and IBM. The movie was a ratings success, beating Charlie's Angels, and Rosemont found raising finance easier from then on.

== See also ==
- Adaptations of Les Misérables
