= Pleasure Palace =

- Genre: Drama
- Written by: Blanche Hanalis
- Directed by: Walter Grauman
- Starring: Omar Sharif; Victoria Principal; J.D. Cannon
- Composer: Allyn Ferguson
- Country of origin: United States
- Original language: English

Production
- Producer: Norman Rosemont
- Production location: Las Vegas
- Cinematography: Jack Swain
- Editor: John A. Fegan Jr.
- Running time: 97 min.
- Production company: Marble Arch Productions

Original release
- Network: CBS
- Release: October 22, 1980

Pleasure Palace is a 1980 television movie.

== Plot ==
A high stakes womanizer and gambler agrees to help a female casino owner. We are led to believe that Principal's character is a glamorous jewel thief. A successful gambler, known internationally for his romantic conquests, finds his reputation at stake.

== Cast ==
- Omar Sharif as Louis Lefevre
- Victoria Principal as Patti
- Hope Lange as Madelaine Calvert
- Jose Ferrer as Andre "Pokey" Poquette
- Gerald S. O'Loughlin as Benny Moffo
- Teddi Siddall as Bobby
- John Fujioka as Ito
- Alexander Zale as Hussein
- Joe Bernard as Starkey

== Production ==
The film was shot in Las Vegas.

== Reception ==
The New York Times called it "not a great trash movie, but it deserves a B+ for trying".
