= Back to the Secret Garden =

2000 family fantasy film directed by Michael Tuchner

- Official poster
- Genre: Fantasy
- Based on: Characters from The Secret Garden by Frances Hodgson Burnett
- Written by: Joe Wiesenfeld
- Directed by: Michael Tuchner
- Starring: Joan Plowright; George Baker; Cherie Lunghi; David Warner; Camilla Belle
- Music by: Allyn Ferguson
- Country of origin: United States
- Original language: English

Production
- Executive producers: Norman Rosemont; Robert Halmi Jr.; David V. Picker
- Producer: Nick Gillott
- Cinematography: Ian Wilson
- Editor: Keith Palmer
- Running time: 101 minutes
- Production companies: Rosemont Productions; Hallmark Entertainment

Original release
- Network: Showtime
- Release: August 11, 2000

Back to the Secret Garden is a 2000 American family fantasy television film. It serves as a sequel to the 1987 Hallmark Hall of Fame film, The Secret Garden. Directed Michael Tuchner, written by Joe Wiesenfeld and produced by Nick Gillott, it contains some of the previous characters from the first film such as Lady Mary and Sir Colin Craven, who are now married, and Martha Sowerby, who is now the mistress of Misselthwaite Manor, which has become an orphanage for children whose parents died in World War II. They had appeared as children in the original story some 40 years earlier, and are now middle aged adults.

The film received a theatrical release exclusively in Oklahoma City on August 11, 2000, and aired on Showtime on September 2, 2001.

== Plot ==
In 1946, 38-year-old Lady Mary Craven visits an American orphanage, telling the children about an exchange program that will allow one child to travel to England and stay at Misselthwaite Manor, now an orphanage. She meets young Lizzie Buscana, who is in the garden trying to take care of her mother's rose bush. Lady Mary tells Lizzie about the exchange program and the secret garden, whereupon Lizzie agrees to participate so she can see the garden for herself.

Lizzie arrives in England and is met at the train station by Martha Sowerby, who runs Misselthwaite Manor. Lizzie quickly discovers that the children are only allowed to be in the garden on Sunday after church and must be on their best behaviour and not touch anything.

Making friends with Geraldine, Steven and Robert, Lizzie visits the garden after curfew and realizes that she must help it. Returning to the manor Lizzie notices a fire in Robert's room, caused by Robert having fallen asleep with a candle still lit. After alerting everyone and helping put out the fire, she is questioned by Martha as to why she is still dressed and how she knew there was a fire. Lizzie tells Martha about her illicit visit to the garden, and Martha discovers that Lizzie stole the key to the garden. Martha discovers that Geraldine told Lizzie about the key, but Martha believes the key should belong to Lizzie, and that the garden has chosen her, instead of Martha, who could not find the door.

Geraldine, who is jealous of Lizzie, learns that Ms. Sowerby gave the key to Lizzie, and persuades Steven to steal it in revenge for Lizzie's rejection of his feelings. When Lizzie finds the key missing, she assumes that Robert has taken it, knowing of his animosity towards her. She goes to find the key with Robert and discovers that it was Steven who took it, on Geraldine's instructions, and threw the key in the pond. Lizzie confronts Geraldine, who initially denies it, but confesses when Martha punishes her for being a liar.

Lizzie is told that maybe she does not need the key, because of the magic door. When Martha goes to meet Lady Mary, who has returned to Misselthwaite, she tells Mary of the garden's untended state, even though it has been well-tended in her absence. Lizzie realizes that the garden has been starved of children's love and fun and with the help of Robert she gathers the orphans, including Geraldine and Steven, who run to the quickly-reviving garden.

Lady Mary and Sir Colin arrive with Martha and are amazed, as the garden does not look dead as Martha had described. Lizzie tells Lady Mary that the garden needed love and that she should not have it closed. Lady Mary informs Lizzie that the garden belongs to her, and that it took "a girl from across the sea, many years ago" to bring the garden back to life, and that it has taken a girl from across the sea to do it again, and that it is up to her to do as she wishes with the garden. Lizzie announces that the garden will stay open so that all the children can enjoy it.

== Cast ==
- Camilla Belle as Lizzie Buscana
- Aled Roberts as Robert
- Florence Hoath as Geraldine
- Justin Girdler as Steven
- Joan Plowright as Martha Sowerby
- George Baker as Will Weatherstaff
- Cherie Lunghi as Lady Mary Craven
- Leigh Lawson as Sir Colin Craven
- David Warner as Dr. Snodgrass
- Danielle McCormack as Penelope
- Liza Ross as Sister Mary
- Lisa Martin as Doris
- Sheila Steafel as Miss Chillblaine
