= James Olson (actor) =

American actor (1930–2022)

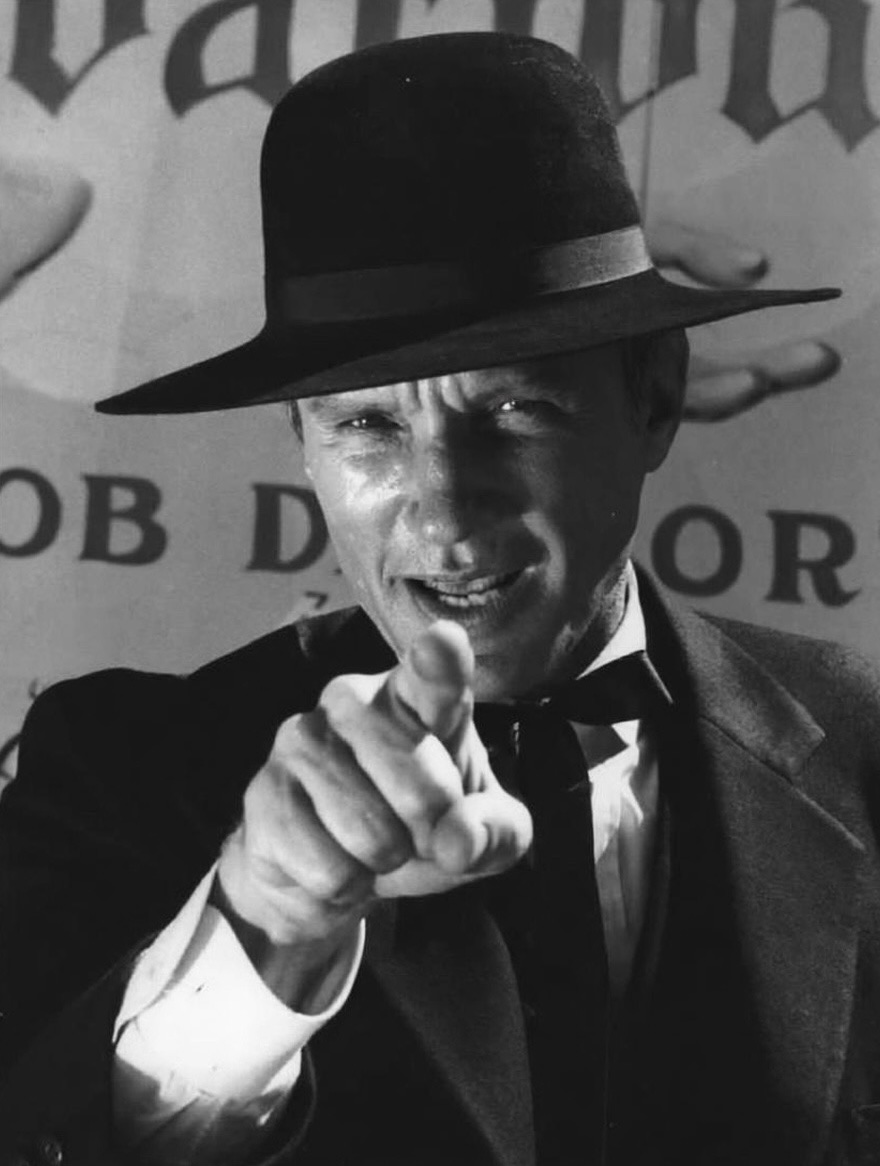
- Olson in Little House on the Prairie, 1979
- Born: October 8, 1930; Evanston, Illinois, U.S.
- Died: April 17, 2022 (aged 91); Malibu, California, U.S.
- Education: Northwestern University; Actors Studio
- Occupation: Actor
- Years active: 1956–2001

James R. Olson (October 8, 1930 – April 17, 2022) was an American actor.

== Early life and education ==
Olson was born in Evanston, Illinois, on October 8, 1930. As a child, he recorded radio jingles. He graduated from Evanston Township High School and Northwestern University. While studying at Northwestern, performed stage work in and around Chicago.

From 1952 until 1954, he served in the U.S. Army as an MP. After his discharge, he moved to New York to study at the Actors Studio.

== Career ==
Olson made his Broadway debut in The Young and Beautiful in 1955. The following year, he made his film debut in The Sharkfighters.

His Broadway credits included J.B. (1958–59), Romulus the Great (1962), and Tennessee Williams' duology Slapstick Tragedy (both 1966). He played Baron Tuzenbach in the Actors Studio production of Three Sisters in 1964, which was filmed in 1966 and distributed by Commonwealth United Entertainment. He played Mr. Buckley in the musical version of Breakfast at Tiffany's, which closed during previews. In the 1980s, he appeared in Twelve Dreams and The Winter's Tale for The Public Theater.

Olson starred alongside Joanne Woodward in the Oscar-nominated Rachel, Rachel in 1968. He then went to Britain to star in two films for Hammer Film Productions: Moon Zero Two (1969) and Crescendo (1970). In 1971, he starred as Dr. Mark Hall in the science-fiction thriller The Andromeda Strain. He also played priest Father Adamsky in the horror sequel Amityville II: The Possession (1982), and Maj. General Kirby in the Arnold Schwarzenegger action film Commando (1985).

On television, Olson portrayed Mickey Mantle on the Kraft Mystery Theatre. His other TV appearances included guest roles on scores of shows, including episodes of Kraft Television Theatre; Ironside; Murder, She Wrote; Little House on the Prairie; Hawaii Five-O; Battlestar Galactica; Lou Grant; The Bionic Woman; Wonder Woman; Mannix; Bonanza; Have Gun - Will Travel; Marcus Welby, M.D.; Police Woman; Barnaby Jones; The New Land; Columbo; Maude; The Virginian; The Streets of San Francisco; and Cannon.

He retired in 1990.

== Death ==
Olson died at his home in Malibu, California on April 17, 2022, at the age of 91. He was survived by two nieces, Susan Baker and Robin Olson, a nephew, David James Olson, and three grandnephews.

== Filmography ==
=== Film ===
Year	Title	Role	Notes
1956	The Sharkfighters	Ens. Harold Duncan	
1957	The Strange One	Roger Gatt	
1966	The Three Sisters	Baron Nikolai Tuzenbach	
1968	Rachel, Rachel	Nick Kazlik	
1968	The Stalking Moon	Cavalry Officer	Uncredited
1969	Moon Zero Two	Kemp	
1970	Crescendo	Georges Ryman / Jacques Ryman	
1971	The Andromeda Strain	Dr. Mark Hall	
1971	Wild Rovers	Joe Billings	
1972	The Groundstar Conspiracy	Sen. Stanton	
1978	The Mafu Cage	David	
1981	Ragtime	Father	
1982	Amityville II: The Possession	Father Adamsky	
1985	Commando	Major Gen. Franklin Kirby	
1987	Rachel River	Jack Canon	

=== Television ===
Year	Title	Role(s)	Notes
1956	Kraft Mystery Theatre	Mickey Mantle	Episode: "The Life of Mickey Mantle"
1956	Robert Montgomery Presents	Capt. Dicer	Episode: "The Young and Beautiful"
1956	NBC Matinee Theater		Episode: "Cold Christmas"
1957	Harbourmaster	Charlie Potter	Episode: "Widow's Walk"
1958	Have Gun – Will Travel	Owen Deaver	Episode: "The Five Books of Owen Deaver"
1959	Frontiers of Faith		Episode: "Harvest of Zeroes"
1959	Camera Three		Episode: "Selma Broeter"
1960	Playhouse 90	Les Thorpe	Episode: "Tomorrow"
1961	The Play of the Week	Pete Hazelmae, Harry	2 episodes
1961–62	Armstrong Circle Theatre	Sgt. Harold Welby, Allen Menkin	2 episodes
1963	Route 66	Thad School	Episode: "What a Shining Young Man Was Our Gallant Lieutenant"
1962–63	The Defenders	Dr. Frank Spencer, Linus Hale	2 episodes
1965	The Nurses	Edward Curtis	Episode: "Where There's Smoke"
1967	The Magical World of Disney	Chuck Williams	Episode: "Atta Girl, Kelly!: Love is Blind"
1967	NET Playhouse	Hovstad	Episode: "An Enemy of the People"
1969	Lancer	Alton Gannett	Episode: "Death Bait"
1969	The Virginian	Hosea McKinley	Episode: "The Land Dreamer"
1969, 1972	Bonanza	Vance, Kelly Adams	2 episodes
1969, 1974	Mannix	Donald Jordan, George Lassiter	2 episodes
1970	San Francisco International Airport	Prof. Theodore Tragis	Episode: "Emergency Alert"
1970	Medical Center	Dave Toland	Episode: "Accused"
1970–74	The F.B.I.	Various	3 episodes
1971	Insight	Dr. Blake	Episode: "The War of the Eggs"
1971	Paper Man	Art Fletcher	TV movie
1971	The Bold Ones: The Lawyers	Cavan Searle	Episode: "The Letter of the Law"
1971	McCloud	Thomas Dane	Episode: "The Disposal Man"
1971, 1973	Ironside	David Wills, Martin Bosner	2 episodes
1972	Columbo	Paul Rifkin	Episode: "Etude in Black"
1972	Gunsmoke	Bede Stalcup	Episode: "The Fugitives"
1972	Jigsaw	Dr. Leo Heller	Episode: "To Stalk the Night"
1972–73	The Rookies	Walter Bolton, Steve Wainz	2 episodes
1972–76	The Streets of San Francisco	Various	3 episodes
1972–79	Hawaii Five-O	Various	5 episodes
1972, 1975	Cannon	Jim Relko, Judge Norman Killian	2 episodes
1973	Incident on a Dark Street	Joe Dubbs	TV movie
1973	Police Story	Sgt. Walters	Episode: "Man on a Rack"
1973	Legend in Granite	Max McGee	TV movie
1973, 1975	McMillan & Wife	Mr. Townsend, W.T. Knox	2 episodes
1973, 1976	Barnaby Jones	Randall Stone, Walter Cahill	2 episodes
1974	Marcus Welby, M.D.	George Baxter	Episode: "Angela's Nightmare"
1974	The Manhunter	Walt Hovis	Episode: "Pilot"
1974	The Missiles of October	NSA McGeorge Bundy	TV movie
1974	A Tree Grows in Brooklyn	McShane	TV movie
1974	Man on the Outside	Gerald Griffin	TV movie
1974	The New Land	Johansen	Episode: "The Word Is: Persistence"
1974	The Sex Symbol	Calvin Bernard	TV movie
1974	Movin' On	Ben Simms	Episode: "Gift"
1974	Kung Fu	Damion	Episode: "The Garments of Rage"
1974	Harry O	Capt. Pete Jaklin	Episode: "Material Witness"
1975	The Family Nobody Wanted	Carl Doss	TV movie
1975	Someone I Touched	Sam Hyatt	TV movie
1975	Strange New World	Surgeon	TV movie
1975	Caribe	Matson	Episode: "One Second to Doom"
1975	Maude	Sen. Bob Myers	3 episodes
1976	Law and Order	Insp. Ed Shea	TV movie
1976	Police Woman	Curry	Episode: "Brainwash"
1977	Wonder Woman	Wotan	Episode: "Last of the $2 Bills"
1977	Most Wanted	John Ryerson	Episode: "The Ritual Killer"
1977	The Spell	Glenn	TV movie
1977	The Bionic Woman	Rod Kyler	2 episodes
1977	The Court-Martial of George Armstrong Custer	George Armstrong Custer	TV movie
1978	Lou Grant	Archer Corwin	Episode: "Scandal"
1978	The Runaways	Burt Williams	Episode: "No Prince for Cinderella"
1978	Battlestar Galactica	Thane	2 episodes
1978	Greatest Heroes of the Bible	Polah	Episode: "Samson and Delilah"
1978	Project U.F.O.	Dr. Ted Sanders	Episode: "Sighting 4020: The Island Incident"
1979	B. J. and the Bear	Paul Vane	Episode: "Run for the Money"
1979	The Misadventures of Sheriff Lobo	Paul Vane	2 episodes
1979	Little House on the Prairie	Rev. Jacob Danforth	Episode: "The Faith Healer"
1980	The Silent Lovers	Victor Seastrom	TV movie
1983	Cave-In!	Tom Arlen	TV movie
1984	The Parade	Andy Janacek	TV movie
1984	Matt Houston	Caleb Martin	Episode: "Vanished"
1985	North Beach and Rawhide	Bill Cassidy	TV movie
1986	One Police Plaza	Whitney Zangline	TV movie
1988	Jake and the Fatman	Dr. Robert Byers	Episode: "It Had to Be You"
1990	The Family Man	Blair	Episode: "Fire Break"
1990	Murder, She Wrote	Clarence La Rue	Episode: "A Body to Die For"

== Partial stage credits ==
Year	Title	Role	Venue	Notes
1955	Julius Caesar	Titinius	American Shakespeare Theatre, Stratford	
1955	The Young and Beautiful	Capt. Dicer	Longacre Theatre, New York City	Broadway debut
1955	The Young and Beautiful	Capt. Dicer	ANTA Playhouse, New York City	
1957	The Sin of Pat Muldoon	Father Gallagher	Cort Theatre, New York City	
1958	Hamlet	Guildenstern	American Shakespeare Theatre, Stratford	
1958	A Midsummer Night's Dream	Lysander	American Shakespeare Theatre, Stratford	
1958–59	J.B.	2nd Roustabout	ANTA Playhouse, New York City	
1960	The World of Suzie Wong	Robert Lomax	U.S. & Canada tour	
1961	Rain	Sgt. O'Hara	Fred Miller Theatre, Milwaukee	
1962	Romulus the Great	Spurius Titus Mamma	Music Box Theatre, New York City	
1964	The Chinese Prime Minister	Red Gus Risko	Royale Theatre, New York City	
1964	Three Sisters	Baron Nikolai Tuzenbach	Morosco Theatre, New York City	
1966	The Mutilated	Slim	Longacre Theatre, New York City	
1966	The Gnadiges Fraulein	Indian Joe	Longacre Theatre, New York City	
1966	Breakfast at Tiffany's	Mr. Buckley	Forrest Theatre, Philadelphia	Closed after previews
1966	Breakfast at Tiffany's	Mr. Buckley	Majestic Theatre, New York City	Closed after previews
1967	Of Love Remembered	Karl	ANTA Playhouse, New York City	
1972–73	The Crucible		Ahmanson Theatre, Los Angeles	
1982	Twelve Dreams	Charles Hatrick	The Public Theater, New York City	
1983	Winterplay	James	South Street Theatre, New York City	
1985	Before I Got My Eye Put Out		South Coast Repertory, Costa Mesa	
1989	The Winter's Tale	Camillo	The Public Theater, New York City	
