= Barriers (TV series) =

- Created by: William Corlett
- Starring: Benedict Taylor
- Country of origin: United Kingdom
- Original language: English
- No. of series: 2
- No. of episodes: 20

Production
- Producer: Margaret Bottomley
- Running time: 30 minutes
- Production company: Tyne Tees Television

Original release
- Network: ITV
- Release: 4 January 1981 – 21 February 1982

Barriers is a British children's television series, created and written by William Corlett and made by Tyne Tees Television. It was broadcast on ITV between 1981 and 1982.

The series starred Benedict Taylor as Billy Stanyon, a teenager facing up to the loss of his parents, only to discover that he was adopted. Billy then sets off on a journey to find his real parents that takes him across Europe. The series was filmed on location in Scotland, Germany and Austria. An initial series of thirteen episodes in 1981 was followed by a further seven episodes in 1982.

== Cast ==
=== Main ===
- Benedict Taylor as Billy Stanyon
- Paul Rogers as Vincent Whitaker
- Laurence Naismith as Dr. Ernest Jolland
- Patricia Lawrence as Miss. Price

=== Recurring ===
- Siân Phillips as Mrs. Dalgleish (Series 1–2)
- Brigitte Horney as Elsa Gruber (Series 1)
- Ursula Lingen as Hilde Gruber (Series 1)
- Robert Addie as Spike (Series 1)
- Siegfried Rauch as Kurt Gruber (Series 2)

=== Guest ===
Characters who have made a single-episode appearance:

- Jack McKenzie as Sportsmaster (Series 1, Episode 1)
- Alyson Spiro as Mags (Series 1, Episode 2)
- Edward Hibbert as Harding (Series 1, Episode 4)
- Nicholas Courtney as Henri Beauvoir (Series 1, Episode 7)
- Natasha Parry as Giselle (Series 1, Episode 7)
- Walter Gotell as Karl Zuckmayer (Series 1, Episode 13)
- Suzanne Roquette as Secretary (Series 1, Episode 13)
- Carl Duering as Herr Greisinger (Series 2, Episode 1)
- Denise Welch as Janet Tompkinson (Series 2, Episode 4)
- Joan Hickson as Traffic Warden (Series 2, Episode 6)
- Michael Gough as Old Man (Series 2, Episode 6)
