= Florence Hoath =

British actress

- Born: Florence Angela L. Hoath; 12 July 1984 (age 42); London, England
- Spouse: Neil Toon
- Website: https://youtube.com/@zinnipops

Florence Angela L. Hoath (born 12 July 1984) is a British actress.

== Career ==
The daughter of actress Tina Martin (1948-2024), Hoath was born in London and made her film debut in the 1993 screen adaptation of Secret Rapture at the age of eight. Since then she has appeared in a number of film and television productions, including the 2005 Doctor Who episodes "The Empty Child" and "The Doctor Dances". Also in that year, Hoath was cast to play the regular role of George Fitzgerald in Channel 5's daytime soap Family Affairs, but the show was cancelled weeks after her introduction, the final episode being broadcast in December 2005.

Hoath's last screen credit was a role in the 2008 television miniseries Lost in Austen. In an interview published in Doctor Who Magazine during March 2015, she confirmed she was no longer acting.

In September 2022 Florence and her husband Neil Toon created a children's entertainment YouTube channel, ZinniPops. In March 2024 Florence announced the death of her mother on her Instagram account.

== Selected filmography ==
=== Film ===
Year	Title	Role	Notes
1994	A Pin for the Butterfly	Marushka	
1995	Innocent Lies	Angela Cross	
1997	FairyTale: A True Story	Elsie Wright	
1998	The Governess	Clementina Cavendish	
1999	Tom's Midnight Garden	Hatty (12/13 years)	
2000	Back to the Secret Garden	Geraldine	TV movie

=== Television ===
Year	Title	Role	Notes
1995	The Haunting of Helen Walker	Flora	TV movie
1996	The Demon Headmaster	Bess	3 episodes
2001	The Cazalets	Clary Cazalet	6 episodes
2002	Goodbye, Mr. Chips	Alice Johnson	TV movie
2004	Agatha Christie's Marple	Pamela Reeves	1 episode
2005	Doctor Who	Nancy	2 episodes: The Empty Child and The Doctor Dances
2005	Family Affairs	George Fritzgerald	50 episodes
2008	Bike Squad	Sheena West	TV movie
2008	Doctors	Emily Fenton	5 episodes
2008	Lost in Austen	Kitty Bennet	4 episodes

== Awards and nominations ==
Year	Award	Category	Title of work	Result
1998	Young Artist Award	Best Performance in a Feature Film - Leading Young Actress	FairyTale: A True Story	Nominated
