= Fergie & Andrew: Behind the Palace Doors =

1992 British TV film

Fergie & Andrew: Behind the Palace Doors is a 1992 British TV film about the courtship between Prince Andrew and Sarah Ferguson.

It was produced by Norman Rosemont.
