= A Tree Grows in Brooklyn (1974 film) =

- Genre: Drama
- Based on: A Tree Grows in Brooklyn by Betty Smith
- Written by: Frank Davis; Blanche Hanalis
- Directed by: Joseph Hardy
- Starring: Cliff Robertson; Diane Baker; James Olson
- Theme music composer: Jerry Goldsmith
- Country of origin: United States
- Original language: English

Production
- Producer: Norman Rosemont
- Cinematography: Charles F. Wheeler
- Editors: Gene Milford; J. Frank O'Neill
- Running time: 89 minutes
- Production companies: Norman Rosemont Productions; 20th Century Fox Television

Original release
- Network: NBC
- Release: March 27, 1974

A Tree Grows in Brooklyn is a 1974 American made for television drama film from 20th Century Fox based on the 1943 novel of the same name by Betty Smith.

It was produced by Norman Rosemont.

== Plot ==
The story of a family living in a New York City slum in 1912, headed by a loving but alcoholic father and a strong-willed mother.

== Cast ==
- Cliff Robertson as Johnny Nolan
- Diane Baker as Katie Nolan
- James Olsen as McShane
- Pamelyn Ferdin as Francie Nolan
- Michael-James Wixted as Neely Nolan
- Nancy Malone as Aunt Sissy
- Allyn Ann McLerie as Miss Martin
- Liam Dunn as Mr. Barker
- Anne Seymour as Miss Tilford
- Booth Colman as Doctor
- Shirley Slater as Joey's Mother
- Johnny Lee as Joey

== See also ==
- List of American films of 1974
