= The Last Mile (1992 film) =

1992 television film

The Last Mile DVD

The Last Mile is a short comedy-drama filmed play written by Terrence McNally and directed by Paul Bogart for Public television's Great Performances 20th Anniversary Special (1992). The 15-minute film aired on American Public television stations in October 1992. The play concerns the hopes and fears of a soprano making her Metropolitan Opera debut.

== Synopsis ==
Backstage at the Metropolitan Opera House a soprano is preparing for her debut in the opera Tosca. The stage manager gives her encouraging advice. She is visited by her "tenor for the evening". Equally terrified and nervous yet excited, she thinks fondly of her brother, who died from AIDS. He appears to her in her dressing room as a ghostly apparition.

== Cast ==
- Tony Goldwyn as Scott
- Bill Irwin as The Maestro
- Nathan Lane as The stage Manager
- Bernadette Peters as The Soprano
- Paul Sorvino as The Tenor

== Production ==
Directed by Paul Bogart, The Last Mile stars Bernadette Peters as the soprano, Nathan Lane as the stage manager, Tony Goldwyn as her brother, Paul Sorvino as the tenor, and Bill Irwin as the conductor.

== Response ==
Daily Variety wrote that the play was "uneven", but that "Peters is a gem, with Bill Irwin terrif as a cynical conductor." The USA Today reviewer wrote: "Another grande dame, Bernadette Peters, anchors the best piece, Terrence McNally's acerbic and sentimental backstage look at a soprano nervously awaiting her Metropolitan Opera debut as Tosca. Lurking in the wings: poignant awareness of that grand-opera tragedy of our time, the AIDS crisis."

John Leonard, reviewing for the New York Magazine, wrote :"As we've come to expect from McNally, there are several twists, one of them involving AIDS."

== See also ==
- PBS series Great Performances
