= Benedict Taylor =

British actor (born 1960)

- Born: Benedict Sean Taylor; 18 April 1960 (age 66); Hampstead, London, England
- Occupation: Actor
- Spouse: Kate Taylor
- Children: 3

Benedict Sean Taylor (born 18 April 1960) is a British actor.

Taylor was born in Hampstead, London, the eldest of six children of Richard, a documentary film maker, and Allegra, a writer. Taylor lived in Nigeria until 1965 and then was brought up in London.

Taylor started working as a child actor in 1969 with the Royal Shakespeare Company. He concentrated solely on acting and voice-overs until 1985. He appeared as Nicholas Lillie in the Tales of the Unexpected episode (9/5) "The Facts of Life" (1988).

== Selected filmography ==
Year	Title	Role	Notes
1974	The Turn of the Screw	Timothy	TV movie
1980	The Watcher in the Woods	Mike Fleming	
1981–1982	Barriers	Billy Stanyon	TV series, lead role
1982	Beau Geste	Michael 'Beau' Geste	TV miniseries
1983	A Flame to the Phoenix	Max Kurowicki	
1984	The Far Pavilions	Wally	TV miniseries
1984	The Last Days of Pompeii	Antonius	TV miniseries
1984	The First Olympics: Athens 1896	Edwin Flack	TV miniseries
1985	Black Arrow	Richard	TV movie
1985	The Corsican Brothers	Georges Du Caillaud	TV movie
1985	My Brother Jonathan	Harold Dakers	TV series
1985	Thirteen at Dinner	Donald Ross	TV movie
1985	Behind Enemy Lines	Simon	TV movie
1986	Every Time We Say Goodbye	Peter	
1987	Vanity Fair	George Osborne	TV series
1987	A Perfect Spy	Magnus Pym	TV miniseries
1989	Bergerac	Toby Lemaire	
1991	Duel of Hearts	Lord Vane Brecon	TV movie
1991	An Actor's Life for Me	Sebastian Groom	TV series
1992	The Darling Buds of May	Pieter	episode "Stranger at the Gates"
1992	Charles and Diana: Unhappily Ever After	Prince Andrew, Duke of York	TV movie
1992	Jewels	Julian	TV miniseries
1993	The 10 Percenters	Atin	TV series
1993	Sharpe's Regiment	Col. William Lawford	TV series
1998	Monk Dawson	Bobby Winterman	
1999	Star Wars: Episode I – The Phantom Menace	Fighter Pilot Bravo 2	
1999	The Young Indiana Jones Chronicles: Adventures in the Secret Service	Prince Sixtus of Bourbon-Parma (archive footage)	
2006	Notes on a Scandal	Eddie	
2008	Trial & Retribution	Jonathan Carlisle	TV series
2008	Breaking Into Tesco		TV series
2009	Breathe: Act One	John Franks	Short
2010	Wallander	Jurgen Nordfeldt	TV series
2010	Perfect Life	Bristor	
2014	Gone	Professor Thomas Verschwunden	Short
2015	Unforgotten	Mark Bennett	TV series
2017	The Hippopotamus	Chauffeur	
2017	The Watcher In The Woods	John Keller	TV movie
