= Kiss Me Kate (1968 film) =

1968 American musical TV film

- Based on: Kiss Me, Kate; 1948 musical by Cole Porter
- Written by: Sam Spewack; Bella Spewack
- Screenplay by: Robert Van Scoyk
- Directed by: Paul Bogart
- Starring: Robert Goulet; Carol Lawrence; Jessica Walter
- Music by: Ray Charles; Jack Elliott; Cole Porter
- Country of origin: United States
- Original language: English

Production
- Producer: Norman Rosemont
- Running time: 90 minutes
- Production company: Rogo Productions

Original release
- Network: ABC
- Release: 1968

Kiss Me Kate is a 1968 American TV film directed by Paul Bogart. It is an adaptation of the 1948 musical Kiss Me, Kate produced by Norman Rosemont, who had previously produced three adaptations of screen musicals.

== Plot summary ==
The film follows a divorced musical theater couple, Fred Graham and Lilli Vanessi, who are cast opposite each other in a musical adaptation of William Shakespeare's 'The Taming of the Shrew'. As they perform on stage, their real-life backstage bickering and lingering romantic feelings begin to mirror the chaotic relationship of the characters they are portraying.

== Cast ==
- Robert Goulet as Fred Graham
- Carol Lawrence as Lilli Vanessi
- Jessica Walter as Lois Lane
- Michael Callan as Bill Calhoun
- Marty Ingels as Gangster
- Jules Munshin as Gangster
- Nick Ullett as Bernie
- Russell Nype as Harrison Howell
- David Doyle as Harry Trevor
