= Camille (1984 film) =

1984 film by Desmond Davis

- Video cover
- Genre: Drama; Romance
- Based on: La Dame aux Camélias by Alexandre Dumas fils
- Written by: Blanche Hanalis
- Directed by: Desmond Davis
- Starring: Greta Scacchi; Colin Firth; John Gielgud; Billie Whitelaw; Patrick Ryecart; Denholm Elliott; Ben Kingsley
- Theme music composer: Allyn Ferguson
- Countries of origin: United Kingdom; United States
- Original language: English

Production
- Producer: Norman Rosemont
- Production location: Paris
- Cinematography: Jean Tournier
- Editor: Alan Pattillo
- Running time: 100 minutes
- Production companies: Hallmark Hall of Fame Productions; Rosemont Productions

Original release
- Network: CBS
- Release: December 11, 1984

Camille is a 1984 television film based on the 1848 novel and play La Dame aux Camélias by Alexandre Dumas, fils. It was adapted by Blanche Hanalis and directed by Desmond Davis. It stars Greta Scacchi, Colin Firth, John Gielgud, Billie Whitelaw, Patrick Ryecart, Denholm Elliott and Ben Kingsley.

== Plot ==
Marguerite Gauthier is a courtesan in 19th-century Paris and keeps company with aristocrats and men of riches. She falls deeply in love with a middle-class man, Armand Duval, and the lovers move away to the countryside.

Armand's father begs Marguerite not to ruin his son's hope of a career and position, she acquiesces and leaves her lover, letting him believe she is going back to her former lifestyle. Armand returns to live with his father.

Sometime later Armand returns to Paris and Marguerite sees him with another woman. She declares her love for Armand and the pair sleep together. In the morning Armand insults her by sending her money and then goes off to work in Egypt.

Later Armand learns that Marguerite is dying and returns to Paris. Marguerite is too ill to recognise him before dying. The memory of Marguerite doesn't diminish with time. In the final scene Armand, now an old man, is putting flowers on Marguerite's grave.

== Cast ==
- Greta Scacchi as Marguerite Gautier
- Colin Firth as Armand Duval
- John Gielgud as Duke de Charles
- Billie Whitelaw as Prudence Duvorney
- Patrick Ryecart as Gaston
- Ben Kingsley as Duval
- Denholm Elliott as Count de Nolly
- Rachel Kempson as Hortense
- Ronald Pickup as Jean
- Julie Dawn Cole as Julie
- Natalie Ogle as Blanche
- Richard Beale as Farmer
- Kathy Staff as Flower Lady
- Maurice Teynac as Joseph
- William Morgan Sheppard as Captain
- Shelagh McLeod as Nicole

(Cast list from Cineplayer)
