= A Pin for the Butterfly =

- Directed by: Hannah Kodicek
- Screenplay by: Hannah Kodicek
- Produced by: James Crawford
- Starring: Ian Bannen; Hugh Laurie; Florence Hoath
- Release date: 13 September 1994
- Running time: 113 min
- Countries: Czech Republic; United Kingdom

A Pin for the Butterfly is a 1994 British-Czech drama film directed by Hannah Kodicek and starring Ian Bannen, Hugh Laurie and Florence Hoath. The screenplay concerns a young girl who tries to come terms with growing up in Stalinist Czechoslovakia. It was screened at the 1994 Cannes Film Festival.

== Cast ==
- Ian Bannen ... Grandpa
- Gregory Gudgeon ... Leon
- Florence Hoath ... Marushka
- Ian Hogg ... Great Uncle
- Alex Kingston
- Hugh Laurie ... Uncle
- Joan Plowright ... Grandma
- Imogen Stubbs ... Mother
