= All Quiet on the Western Front (1979 film) =

1979 American television film by Delbert Mann

- DVD cover
- Genre: Drama; War
- Based on: All Quiet on the Western Front by Erich Maria Remarque
- Written by: Paul Monash
- Directed by: Delbert Mann
- Starring: Richard Thomas; Ernest Borgnine; Donald Pleasence; Ian Holm; Patricia Neal; Dai Bradley
- Music by: Allyn Ferguson
- Country of origin: United States/United Kingdom
- Original language: English

Production
- Executive producers: Martin Starger; Ron Carr
- Producer: Norman Rosemont
- Production location: Czechoslovakia
- Cinematography: John Coquillon
- Editors: Alan Pattillo; Bill Blunden
- Camera setup: Arriflex Cameras
- Running time: 150 minutes / 129 minutes (theatrical release)
- Production companies: Norman Rosemont Productions; Marble Arch Productions; ITC Entertainment

Original release
- Network: CBS
- Release: November 14, 1979

All Quiet on the Western Front is an epic anti-war television film produced by ITC Entertainment. It was released on November 14, 1979. Based on the 1929 book of the same name by Erich Maria Remarque, it stars Richard Thomas and Ernest Borgnine. Directed by Delbert Mann, this film is a joint British and American production for which most of the filming took place in Czechoslovakia.

== Plot ==
In 1914, 18-year-old Paul Bäumer enlists in the German army with five school friends (Behm, Kropp, Muller, Kemmerich and Leer), after being indoctrinated by Kantorek, their teacher, as to the superiority of German culture. After surviving training camp under Corporal Himmelstoss, a harsh disciplinarian, the men board a troop train bound for the Western Front, as another train arrives loaded with returning wounded.

At the front line they are assigned to a squad with Tjaden, Westhus, Detering and others, under the leadership of Stanislaus "Kat" Katzinsky, an older recalled reservist. Kat teaches them survival skills.

When Paul and his squad rotate from the line into French billets, they are joined by a replacement draft led by Himmelstoss who no longer intimidates them.

The French and German armies are shown attacking each other repeatedly over a few hundred yards of torn, corpse-strewn land. During one attack, Paul catches Himmelstoss hanging back and Paul forces him to keep up with the rest. Kemmerich is wounded, and later dies in an overcrowded army hospital, unnerving Paul.

In another action, a French soldier seeks cover in the same crater as Paul, who stabs him in the stomach. Trapped in the crater, Paul tries to bandage the Frenchman's wounds, but he dies and Paul escapes, stricken with guilt.

Although Paul, Kropp and Leer have their first sexual experience with a trio of accommodating French village girls, the vast majority of the young men's experiences are horrific. One by one, practically all of Paul's schoolmate friends die. Kaiser Wilhelm II (Denys Graham) visits their camp to ceremoniously pin medals on heroic soldiers, including Himmelstoss.

Behm dies in a shelling behind the lines while Kropp loses a leg and Paul is seriously wounded. Paul returns home on recuperation leave and learns their mother is dying of cancer. In visits to a beer garden and to his former teacher, Paul realises that his town's older men, in their enthusiasm for war, have no sense of the horrors they have sent their youths to. He also visits Kemmerich's mother and lies to her that he did not suffer.

After returning to duty, Kat is wounded in the leg by shrapnel and Paul carries him to a field hospital, discovering that Kat had bled to death during the journey.

Paul writes to Kropp, the sole survivor of their class, now an amputee. Checking on the younger soldiers in their trench, he starts to sketch a bird he encounters. When the bird flies away, Paul stands up and a sniper's shot rings out. A field communique from the German High Command is captioned over Paul's lifeless body, declaring "All Quiet on the Western Front", the date on the communique showing '11 October 1918', exactly one month before the Armistice of 11 November 1918.

== Cast ==
- Richard Thomas as Paul Bäumer
- Ernest Borgnine as Stanislaus "Kat" Katczinsky
- Donald Pleasence as Kantorek
- Ian Holm as Himmelstoss
- Patricia Neal as Mrs. Bäumer
- Mark Elliott as Behm
- Dai Bradley as Kropp
- Matthew Evans as Müller
- George Winter as Kemmerich
- Dominic Jephcott as Leer
- Mark Drewry as Tjaden
- Colin Mayes as Westhus
- Ewan Stewart as Detering
- Michael Sheard as Mr. Bäumer
- Katerina Lirova as Paul's Sister
- Mary Miller as Mrs. Kemmerich
- Denys Graham as Kaiser Wilhelm II

== Production ==
The film maintains a very authentic look throughout its course. Paul and his friends are clearly part of an industrialized war machine that ruthlessly uses them despite the soldiers having only a vague understanding of what they are fighting for. Authentic details such as new replacement soldiers seen in the film getting younger and younger as the story progresses are reflective of how Germany, like most of the combatants, struggled to find new recruits for the ranks of their armies at the front as the war progressed. Norman Rosemont paid Remarque's widow, Paulette Goddard, $100,000 for the film rights.

== Reception ==
The film won the Golden Globe Award for Best Motion Picture Made for Television as well as an Emmy Award for Outstanding Film Editing for a Limited Series or a Special.

== Theatrical release and home media ==
The original 150-minute US TV version was edited and received a limited worldwide theatrical release. The resulting 129-minute version was the one subsequently released on open matte (4:3 aspect ratio) VHS videos and DVDs. Commencing with the 2009 UK Blu-ray, all DVDs and Blu-rays feature the original, unedited version. All of these, bar the 4:3 UK (ITV) and Australian (Beyond Home Entertainment) Blu-rays, are also in the film's cropped widescreen aspect ratio.
