= Stay the Night (1992 film) =

- Genre: Crime; Drama
- Written by: Daniel Freudenberger
- Directed by: Harry Winer
- Starring: Barbara Hershey; Jane Alexander; Morgan Weisser
- Music by: Stewart Levin
- Country of origin: United States
- Original language: English

Production
- Executive producers: Stan Margulies; J.C. Shardo
- Cinematography: Thomas Alger Olgeirsson
- Editor: Paul Rubell
- Running time: 100 min.
- Production companies: New World Television; Stan Margulies Productions

Original release
- Network: ABC
- Release: April 26, 1992

Stay the Night is a 1992 American television crime-drama mini-series directed by Harry Winer and starring Barbara Hershey and Jane Alexander.

== Plot ==
Michael Kettman Jr. is a small town teenage boy, who has a scandalous romantic affair with Jimmie Sue Finger, an older, married woman. Jimmie Sue is in an abusive marriage, and she and Michael plot to murder her husband, which will lead to either eternal bliss for the both of them or a curse on their relationship.

== Cast ==
- Barbara Hershey as Jimmie Sue Finger
- Jane Alexander as Blanche Kettman
- Morgan Weisser as Michael Kettman Jr.
- Fred Dalton Thompson as Det. Malone
- Doran Clark as Roxanne Kettman
- Heather Fairfield as Donna
- Melissa Clayton as Sally
- Matthew Posey as D.A. Tom Charron
- Tommy Hollis as Det. Clark
- Earl Hindman as Mike Kettman Sr.
- Judith Jones as Angela Finger
- Scott Brian Higgs as Terry Finger
- Jeff Rose as Tommy
- Eric Ware as Ardis Jones
- Maceo Walker as Swivel
- Tom Nowicki as Jim Berry
- Walton Goggins as Wayne Seagrove
