= The Three Sisters (1966 film) =

1966 US film directed by Paul Bogart

- Directed by: Paul Bogart
- Produced by: Ely Landau
- Starring: Geraldine Page; Sandy Dennis; Kim Stanley; Shelley Winters
- Cinematography: Charles Reinhard
- Production company: The Actors Studio
- Distributed by: Commonwealth United Entertainment
- Release date: 1966
- Running time: 168 minutes
- Country: United States
- Language: English

The Three Sisters is a 1966 American independent drama film directed by Paul Bogart and starring Geraldine Page, Sandy Dennis, Kim Stanley and Shelley Winters. It is based on the 1901 play by Anton Chekhov.

== Cast ==
- Geraldine Page as Olga
- Shelley Winters as Natalya
- Kim Stanley as Masha
- Sandy Dennis as Irina
- Kevin McCarthy as Vershinin
- Gerald Hiken as Andrei
- David Paulsen as Roday
- Albert Paulsen as Kulygin
- Luther Adler as Chebutykin
- James Olson as Baron Tuzenbach
- Robert Loggia as Solyoni
- John Harkins as Fedotik
- Salem Ludwig as Ferapont
- Tamara Daykarhanova as Anfisa
- James Tolkan as Officer / Carnival Character
- Marcia Haufrecht as Gypsy
- Nadyne Turney as Maid / Gypsy
- Mary Mercier as Maid / Carnival Character
- Janice Mars as Maid / Street Musician
- Brooks Morton as Adjuant / Street Musician
- Delos V. Smith, Jr. as Officer / Bear
