= Susan Kodicek =

Czech actress (1948–2011)

Susan Kodicek (also known as Hannah Kodicek; born Zuzana Opršalová; 25 September 1947 – 5 April 2011) was a Czech actress, film director and producer.

== Life ==
Zuzana Opršalová was born on 25 September 1947 in Prague, Czechoslovakia. She was born to the actress Olga Schmidtová and artist Oto Opršal. In 1968, she emigrated to the United Kingdom. After she married, her name changed to Zuzana Kodíčková. From 1980, she was known as Susan Kodicek and later as Hannah Kodicek.

She moved back to the Czech Republic in 2001, and lived in Český Krumlov. She died in Litoměřice on 5 April 2011 of pancreatic cancer, aged 63.

== Career ==
Her first acting experience was a small child role in the film Malí medvědáři (1957). She then appeared in Miloš Forman's film Audition (1963) and Black Peter (1964). She appeared in several other small roles until 1968. From the 1970s, she was active in the United Kingdom.

Her most prominent role was as Irina in Tinker Tailor Soldier Spy. In the United Kingdom, she prepared children's programmes and series for various British TV stations as a screenwriter, director and producer, including children's puppet performances such as Pullover (1982), Sporting Bear (1982), Hobart's Hobbies (1982) and Foxtales (1985). She wrote a book on theatre for children in 1977.

In 1994, Kodicek wrote and directed the film A Pin for the Butterfly, starring Hugh Laurie and Joan Plowright. The film was inspired by her memories of growing up in Stalinist Czechoslovakia.
