= Long Road Home (film) =

1991 television film by John Korty

- Based on: Long Road Home by Ronald B. Taylor
- Written by: Jane-Howard Hammerstein
- Directed by: John Korty
- Starring: Mark Harmon; Lee Purcell; Morgan Weisser; Leon Russom; Timothy Owen Waldrip
- Composer: Craig Safan
- Country of origin: United States
- Original language: English

Production
- Executive producer: Norman Rosemont
- Producer: David A. Rosemont
- Cinematography: Kees Van Oostrum
- Editor: Jim Oliver
- Running time: 78 minutes
- Production companies: Gideon Productions; Rosemont Productions; World International Network

Original release
- Network: NBC
- Release: February 25, 1991

Long Road Home is a 1991 American drama television film directed by John Korty, based on the 1988 novel of the same name by Ronald B. Taylor. The film stars Mark Harmon, Lee Purcell, Morgan Weisser, Leon Russom, and Timothy Owen Waldrip. It revolves around a migrant farm worker who struggles to keep his family alive during the Great Depression of the 1930s. The film received two Primetime Emmy Award nominations for the performances of Purcell and Russom.

== Cast ==
- Mark Harmon as Ertie Robertson
- Lee Purcell as Bessie Robertson
- Morgan Weisser as Jake Robertson
- Leon Russom as Titus Wardlow
- Timothy Owen Waldrip as James Earl
- Vinessa Shaw as Clara Tarpin
- Bianca Rose as Susie Robertson
- Kathryn Morris as Billy Jo Robertson
- Sarah Lundy as Mary Ellen Robertson
- Ronnie Dee Blaire as Elijah Parsons
- Sydney Walker as Kleindecker
- Edward Ivory as Barkham
- Morgan Upton as Bull
- Jim Zubiena as Cletus Sharp
- Donald A. Mercier as Windy
- Rider Strong as Benjy Robertson
- Paul Henri as Will Henry
- Don West as Alf Young
- Ron Kaell as Checker
- Cab Covay as Hammer

== Reception ==
Entertainment Weekly's television critic Ken Tucker wrote that "director John Korty has made a limp, self-pitying little TV movie here, and the script by Jane-Howard Hammerstein is so full of vague grandiloquence that even some of the characters don't understand what's being said." Wilborn Hampton of The New York Times described the film as "a fairy-tale view not only of the Great Depression, but of the labor movement it spawned and the way its victims survived." Ray Loynd of the Los Angeles Times called it the "Best Production Based on a Novel" among 1991 drama television films which he saw.

== Awards and nominations ==
| Year | Award | Category | Recipient | Result |
|---|---|---|---|---|
| 1991 | 43rd Primetime Emmy Awards | Outstanding Lead Actress in a Miniseries or a Special | Lee Purcell | Nominated |
| 1991 | 43rd Primetime Emmy Awards | Outstanding Supporting Actor in a Miniseries or a Special | Leon Russom | Nominated |
| 1992 | 44th Writers Guild of America Awards | Best Adapted Long Form | Jane-Howard Hammerstein | Won |
