= Norman Rosemont =

American film producer

Norman Rosemont (December 12, 1924 in Brooklyn, New York – April 22, 2018 in Scottsdale, Arizona) was an American producer of films, television, and theatre.

He worked as a press agent before moving into theatre. He worked as a general manager of Lerner and Loewe, then began producing TV specials.

He then produced movies for television. He specialized in adaptations of classic novels. "The great classic authors wrote good stories with strong plots about people you could care for. And filming them at length - usually three hours - you can get most of the plot in."

== Awards ==
Rosemont won the 1980 Emmy for outstanding children's programme for the TV movie The Secret Garden, first shown in 1987. All Quiet on the Western Front won the 1980 Golden Globe for best motion picture made for television.

== Select credits ==
- The Broadway of Lerner and Loewe (1962) - TV special
- An Hour with Robert Goulet (1964) - TV special
- Drat! The Cat! (1965) - Broadway musical
- Brigadoon (1966) - TV movie
- Carousel (1967) - TV movie
- Kismet (1967) - TV movie
- Kiss Me Kate (1968) - TV movie
- Stiletto (1969)
- The Bob Goulet Show (1970) - TV special
- The Man Without a Country (1973) - TV movie
- Miracle on 34th Street (1973) - TV movie
- A Tree Grows in Brooklyn (1974) - TV movie
- Great Expectations (1974) - TV movie
- The Red Badge of Courage (1974) - TV movie
- The Count of Monte Cristo (1975) - TV movie
- The 28th Annual Primetime Emmy Awards (1976)- TV special
- The Man in the Iron Mask (1977) - TV movie
- The Court-Martial of George Armstrong Custer (1977).- TV movie
- Captains Courageous (1977) - TV movie
- The Four Feathers (1978) - TV movie
- Les Miserables (1978) - TV movie
- The 31st Annual Primetime Emmy Awards (1979)
- All Quiet on the Western Front (1979) - TV movie
- Pleasure Palace (1980) - TV movie
- Little Lord Fauntleroy (1980) - TV movie
- A Tale of Two Cities (1980) - TV movie
- Big Bend Country (1981) - TV movie
- The Hunchback of Notre Dame (1982) - TV movie
- Ivanhoe (1982) - TV movie
- Witness for the Prosecution (1982) - TV movie
- Master of the Game (1984) - TV mini series
- Camille (1984) - TV movie
- The Corsican Brothers (1985) - TV movie
- The Christmas Gift (1986) - TV movie
- The Secret Garden (1987) - TV movie
- CBS Summer Playhouse - "My Africa" (1988)
- The Tenth Man (1988) - TV movie
- Long Road Home (1991) - TV movie
- Ironclads (1991) - TV movie
- Shadow of a Doubt (1991) - TV movie
- Fergie & Andrew: Behind the Palace Doors (1993) - TV movie
- The Haunting of Helen Walker (1995) - TV movie
- A Knight in Camelot (1998) - TV movie
- Back to the Secret Garden (2000) - TV movie

== Theatre credits ==
- My Fair Lady - company manager
- Drat! The Cat! (1965) - producer
