= Carousel (1967 film) =

- Based on: Carousel; 1945 musical by Richard Rodgers; Oscar Hammerstein II Liliom; 1909 play by Ferenc Molnár
- Screenplay by: Sidney Michaels
- Directed by: Paul Bogart
- Starring: Robert Goulet
- Country of origin: United States
- Original language: English

Production
- Producer: Norman Rosemont
- Running time: 100 minutes
- Production company: Rogo Productions

Original release
- Release: May 7, 1967

Carousel is a 1967 television movie, produced as an Armstrong Circle Theatre special. It is based on the stage musical Carousel. It was produced by Norman Rosemont.

== Plot ==
In a Maine coastal village toward the end of the 19th century, the swaggering, carefree carnival barker, Billy Bigelow, captivates and marries the naive millworker, Julie Jordan. Billy loses his job just as he learns that Julie is pregnant and, desperately intent upon providing a decent life for his family, he is coerced into being an accomplice to a robbery.

== Cast ==
- Robert Goulet as Billy Bigelow
- Mary Grover as Julie
- Pernell Roberts as Jigger
- Jack De Lon as Mr Snow
- Charlie Ruggles as the Starkeeper
- Marlyn Mason as Carrie

== Production ==
It took producer Norman Rosemont several years to negotiate the rights. In December 1966, he announced he bought the rights from 20th Century Fox, who made the 1956 film version. Then Richard Rodgers objected, claiming Fox did not own all the rights.

It starred Robert Goulet, who had performed the role on stage over the previous two years. He had just appeared in a television production of Brigadoon (1966) for Rosemont.

The production was originally going to last for 90 minutes, but Rosemont worried that he would not be able to keep the whole score and any of the plot, and so he expanded it to two hours. Then in March 1967, the production was in the middle of rehearsals when it was picketed by the American Federation of Television and Radio Artists. However, the strike ended and taping was able to be finished by 18 April that year. Filming took place at NBC's Burbank Studios.

== Reception ==
The Los Angeles Times called it an 'exceptional production'.
