= Paul Bogart =

American television director and producer

- Paul Bogart
- Born: Paul Bogoff; November 13, 1919; Harlem, New York City, New York, U.S.
- Died: April 15, 2012 (aged 92); Chapel Hill, North Carolina, U.S.
- Occupations: Director, producer
- Years active: 1953–1995
- Spouse: Alma Jane Gitnick (m. 1941; div. 1979)
- Children: 3
- Relatives: Elliott Gould (ex-son-in-law)

Paul Bogart (né Bogoff; November 13, 1919 – April 15, 2012) was an American television and film director and producer. Bogart directed episodes of the television series 'Way Out in 1961, Coronet Blue in 1967, Get Smart, The Dumplings in 1976, All in the Family from 1975 to 1979, Archie Bunker’s Place in 1979, Mama Malone in 1982 (aired in 1984), and four episodes of the first season of The Golden Girls in 1985. Among his films are Oh, God! You Devil, Torch Song Trilogy, Halls of Anger, Marlowe, Skin Game (both starring James Garner), and Class of '44. He won five Primetime Emmy Awards during his long career, from sixteen nominations. In 1991, he was awarded the French Festival Internationelle Programmes Audiovisuelle at the Cannes Film Festival.

== Biography ==
Paul Bogart was born on November 13, 1919, in Harlem, Manhattan, New York City, New York, as Paul Bogoff. After serving in the U.S. Army Air Forces during the Second World War, Bogart began his career in show-business as a puppeteer with the Berkeley Marionettes in 1946. From there he went on to be stage manager and associate director at the television network NBC, working on live teleplays for the Kraft Television Theatre and Goodyear Playhouse.

Bogart had three children: Tracy, Jennifer (married twice to actor Elliott Gould), and Peter Bogart. He died on April 15, 2012.

== Filmography ==
- Pinocchio (1957)
- Hansel and Gretel (1958)
- Ten Little Indians (1959)
- The Citadel (1960)
- Ages of Man (1960)
- The Three Sisters (1966)
- Evening Primrose (1966)
- An Enemy of the People (1966)
- The Trap of Solid Gold (1967)
- The Final War of Olly Winter (1967)
- Hal Holbrook: Mark Twain Tonight! (1967)
- Carousel (1967)
- Johnny Belinda (1967)
- Kiss Me Kate (1968)
- Marlowe (1969)
- Halls of Anger (1970)
- In Search of America (1971)
- Skin Game (1971)
- Look Homeward, Angel (1972)
- Cancel My Reservation (1972)
- The House Without a Christmas Tree (1972)
- Class of '44 (1973)
- The Thanksgiving Treasure (1973)
- Double Solitaire (1974)
- The Country Girl (1974)
- Tell Me Where It Hurts (1974)
- Mr. Ricco (1975)
- Winner Take All (1975)
- The Easter Promise (1975)
- The Owl and the Pussycat (1975)
- The War Widow (1976)
- You Can't Take It with You (1979)
- Fun and Games (1980)
- Oh, God! You Devil (1984)
- The Canterville Ghost (1986)
- Nutcracker: Money, Madness and Murder (1987)
- Torch Song Trilogy (1988)
- Broadway Bound (1992)
- The Last Mile (1992)
- The Gift of Love (1994)
- The Heidi Chronicles (1995)
