= John Gay (screenwriter) =

American screenwriter (1924–2017)

- Born: April 1, 1924; Whittier, California, U.S.
- Died: February 4, 2017 (aged 92); Santa Monica, California, U.S.
- Citizenship: United States
- Occupation: Screenwriter
- Writing career
- Language: English
- Genres: Screenwriting, film, television
- Notable work: Separate Tables

John Gay (April 1, 1924 – February 4, 2017) was an American screenwriter known for his work in film and television, including adaptations of major literary classics and his nominations for both the Academy Award and the Writers Guild Award for Separate Tables.

== Early life ==
John Gay was born in Whittier, California.

== Career ==
John Gay began his career writing episodes for television anthology series such as Lux Video Theatre, Kraft Television Theatre, and Goodyear Television Playhouse. He made his film screenwriting debut in 1956 with Run Silent, Run Deep. Additional screen credits include Separate Tables, Four Horsemen of the Apocalypse, The Courtship of Eddie's Father, The Hallelujah Trail, No Way to Treat a Lady, Soldier Blue, Sometimes a Great Notion, and A Matter of Time.

For television, Gay adapted numerous literary classics, including The Red Badge of Courage, Captains Courageous, Les Misérables, A Tale of Two Cities, The Hunchback of Notre Dame, Ivanhoe, Uncle Tom's Cabin, and Around the World in 80 Days. He also wrote television biopics of Howard Hughes, George Armstrong Custer, Caryl Chessman, and Adolf Hitler; small screen remakes of Dial M for Murder, Witness for the Prosecution, Inherit the Wind, and Shadow of a Doubt; adaptations of the bestsellers Fatal Vision and Blind Faith by Joe McGinniss and The Burden of Proof by Scott Turow; and the television movie A Piano for Mrs. Cimino starring Bette Davis.

Gay also wrote the one-man play Diversions and Delights, in which Oscar Wilde presents a lecture about his career to a Parisian audience in November 1899. With Vincent Price portraying Wilde, the play premiered in San Francisco in July 1977 and toured more than 300 cities during the next three years.

=== Awards ===
John Gay was nominated for the Academy Award for Best Adapted Screenplay and the Writers Guild of America Award for Best Adapted Screenplay for Separate Tables. He has been nominated once for the Emmy Award for Outstanding Writing in a Limited Series or a Special and three times for the Edgar Award for Best Television Feature or Miniseries.

== Memoir ==
John Gay wrote the memoir Any Way I Can: 50 Years in Show Business with his daughter Jennifer Gay Summers.

== Death ==
John Gay died in Santa Monica, California, on February 4, 2017, at age 92.
