= Jack Elliott (composer) =

American television producer, film composer, and music arranger (1927–2001)

- Born: Irwin Elliott Zucker; August 6, 1927; Hartford, Connecticut
- Died: August 18, 2001 (aged 74) Los Angeles, California
- Occupations: Composer; conductor; music arranger; songwriter; television producer

Irwin Elliott Zucker (August 6, 1927 – August 18, 2001) was an American television and film composer, conductor, music arranger, television producer, and co-founder of the New American Orchestra, later renamed the American Jazz Philharmonic.

== Life and career ==
Elliott was born Irwin Elliott Zucker in Hartford, Connecticut. He was of Romanian Jewish descent. Elliott graduated from the Hartt School of Music and worked as a jazz pianist in New York and Paris in the 1950s. He continued his post-graduate studies in composition with Arnold Franchetti, Isadore Freed, Bohuslav Martinů, and Lukas Foss, but it was Judy Garland who brought Elliott to California to become an arranger for her television show.

Elliott continued his run in television as music director for Andy Williams' long-running series and later produced and conducted the NBC television special Live From Studio 8H: 100 Years of America's Popular Music. He also wrote themes for television shows Night Court, and co-wrote the themes to Barney Miller and Charlie's Angels with Allyn Ferguson. He is listed in New Grove's Dictionary of American Music and was awarded an honorary doctorate from his alma mater, the University of Hartford's Hartt School of Music.

Elliott was co-founder and music director of the American Jazz Philharmonic (formerly the New American Orchestra) and creator of the Henry Mancini Institute. The original name of the Orchestra was "The Big O" and was the largest jazz orchestra of its kind featuring over 92 musicians. Elliott blended the classical European style orchestra with modern American jazz style. His professional repertoire was diverse, highlighted by stints as music director for the Academy Awards, Emmy Awards, Kennedy Center Honors and the 1984 Summer Olympics. In addition, he holds the distinction of serving as music director of the Grammy Awards for 30 consecutive years.

He had an accomplished career in film, scoring numerous hit movies, including Sibling Rivalry, The Jerk, Oh God!, and Where's Poppa?. He also produced the Blade Runner soundtrack album with the New American Orchestra.

Later, Elliott was the music director of the Henry Mancini Institute.

== Personal life ==
Elliott died on August 18, 2001 from a brain tumor. Elliott was the uncle of actress Gina Gershon.

== Selected discography ==
- Are You Lonesome Tonight?...Wonderful Melodies of the Sixties (Kapp, 1961)
- The Orchestra (with Allyn Ferguson) (FNAM, 1979)

== Selected filmography ==
- The Happiest Millionaire (1967)
- The Comic (1969)
- Where's Poppa? (1970)
- T.R. Baskin (1971)
- Support Your Local Gunfighter (1971)
- Get to Know Your Rabbit (1972)
- Oh, God! (1977)
- Just You and Me, Kid (1979)
- The Jerk (1979)
- Sibling Rivalry (1990)

=== Television ===
- McHale's Navy (29 episodes, 1965–1966)
- Pistols 'n' Petticoats (9 episodes, 1966–1967)
- The New Dick Van Dyke Show (7 episodes, 1971–1974)
- The Rookies (14 episodes, 1972–1975)
- Really Raquel (1974)
- Barney Miller (1974–1982) (with Allyn Ferguson)
- Piper's Pets (1978) (TV pilot)
- Charlie's Angels (1976–1981) (with Allyn Ferguson)
- Night Court (1984–1992)

== Awards and nominations ==
| Year | Award | Result | Category | Film or series |
|---|---|---|---|---|
| 1965 | Academy Award | Nominated | Best Music, Scoring of Music, Adaptation or Treatment | The Unsinkable Molly Brown (Shared with Robert Armbruster, Leo Arnaud, Jack Hayes, Calvin Jackson, and Leo Shuken) |
| 1987 | BMI Film & TV Awards | Won | BMI TV Music Award | Night Court |
| 1988 | BMI Film & TV Awards | Won | BMI TV Music Award | Night Court |
| 1989 | BMI Film & TV Awards | Won | BMI TV Music Award | Night Court |
| 1981 | Emmy Award | Nominated | Outstanding Achievement in Music Direction | Omnibus (For December 28, 1980 episode; shared with Alf Clausen and William Goldstein) |
| 1989 | Emmy Award | Nominated | Outstanding Achievement in Music Direction | The Smothers Brothers Comedy Hour |

== See also ==
- Charlie's Angels
- Bel-Tone Records
