= Brigadoon (1966 film) =

- Based on: Brigadoon; 1947 musical by Lerner and Loewe
- Screenplay by: Ernest Kinoy
- Directed by: Fielder Cook
- Starring: Robert Goulet
- Music by: Frederick Loewe; Irwin Kostal
- Country of origin: United States
- Original language: English

Production
- Producers: Fielder Cook; Norman Rosemont
- Running time: 81 minutes
- Production company: Rogo

Original release
- Network: ABC
- Release: October 15, 1966

Brigadoon is a 1966 American television film based on the 1947 musical Brigadoon.

== Plot ==
Two American friends, Tommy and Jeff, are stranded in Scotland when their car breaks down. They see a girl, Fiona, and follow her to her home village of Brigadoon. Everyone is preparing for Jennie Maclaren's wedding. Although he is engaged to a girl back in America, Tommy falls for Fiona, and Jeff has a fling with Meg Brockie. The friends discover the town is under a magical spell which means it only appears once every one hundred years. Fiona wants Tommy to stay but Jeff persuades him to leave.

However, when Tommy goes back to New York he cannot forget Fiona. He returns to Scotland and manages to be reunited with Fiona.

== Cast ==
- Robert Goulet as Tommy Albright
- Peter Falk as Jeff Douglas
- Sally Ann Howes as Fiona Maclaren
- Marlyn Mason as Meg Brockie
- Thomas Carlisle as Charley Dalrymple
- Linda Howe as Jeannie Maclaren
- Rhys Williams as Andrew Maclaren
- Edward Villella as Harry Beaton
- Finlay Currie as Mr Lundie

== Production ==
Producer Norman Rosemont had worked for the company of composers Lerner and Loewe. It took him six years to bring the musical to television.

Writer Ernest Kinoy called adapting the musical 'a tough assignment. Nothing dates faster than musical comedy.' Kinoy said he and director Fielder Cook agreed 'to break down the proscenium, to treat Brigadoon as if it had never been done before, but was created solely for this broadcast'. This meant the action went through the whole town, including inside buildings and taverns. One scene was shot in Malibu Canyon.

The film accommodated much more of the score than the 1954 film version had, though the entire production ran only 90 minutes with commercials. "My Mother's Wedding Day" was restored to this version, though "Once in the Highlands", "Jeannie's Packin' Up", and "The Love of My Life" were still absent.

'The temptation is always to get so involved in plot that you have to cut out six or eight songs,' said Kinoy. 'In the case of Brigadoon, which has one of the loveliest scores ever composed for Broadway, that would be criminal negligence.'

Sally Ann Howes was best known at the time for replacing Julie Andrews (on stage) in My Fair Lady.

== Soundtrack ==
The soundtrack of this TV adaptation was released by Columbia Records (under its "Columbia Special Products" banner, with the original sponsor Armstrong Flooring prominently featured on the jacket,) on the same year as the original broadcast.

== Reception ==
=== Critical ===
The Chicago Tribune called it "a truly great evening of entertainment." The Los Angeles Times said it "plodded". The New York Times called it a "loving production... it would be difficult to imagine a better Fiona than Sally Anne Howes".

=== Follow Up ===
The show was popular enough that in December 1966 it was announced Armstrong Central would sponsor two more TC adaptations of musicals produced by Rosemont, Carousel and Kismet.

=== Awards ===
The film won five Primetime Emmy Awards in 1967. In particular, it won Best Musical Program and Best Directorial Achievement in Variety or Music. The director, Fielder Cook, was also nominated for Outstanding Directorial Achievement in Television at the Directors Guild of America.
