= Bill Blunden =

British television and film editor

Bill Blunden (3 December 1934 – 3 January 2018) was a British television and film editor. He won a Primetime Emmy Award in the category Outstanding Film Editing For A Limited Series Or A Special for the television film All Quiet on the Western Front. His win was shared with Alan Pattillo.

== Selected filmography ==
- Shalako (1968)
- A Touch of Love (1969)
- The Mind of Mr. Soames (1970)
- The Night Visitor (1971)
- Baffled! (1973)
- The House in Nightmare Park (1973)
- Ooh... You Are Awful (1974)
- The Bawdy Adventures of Tom Jones (1976)
- Warlords of Atlantis (1978)
- Hussy (1980)
- The Chain (1984)
