= Allyn Ferguson =

American composer (1924–2010)

Allyn Malcolm Ferguson Jr. (October 18, 1924 – June 23, 2010) was an American composer whose works include the themes for 1970s television programs Barney Miller (1975—1982) and Charlie's Angels (1976—1981), which he co-wrote with Jack Elliott. In its obituary, Variety called him "among the most prolific composers of TV-movie scores in the past 40 years."

== Early life ==
Ferguson was born in San Jose, California on October 18, 1924. He started playing the trumpet when he was four years old and began playing piano at seven. After graduating from San Jose State University, he traveled to Paris, where he studied with Nadia Boulanger and at Tanglewood with Aaron Copland.

== Career ==
Ferguson established the Chamber Jazz Sextet in the 1950s, combining classical and jazz influences. Ferguson and his Chamber Jazz Sextet collaborated with the poet Kenneth Patchen on a recording in 1957, originally titled Kenneth Patchen with the Chamber Jazz Sextet. Behind Patchen's readings, Ferguson and the Chamber Jazz Sextet performed jazz accompaniment which Ferguson composed for eight individual poems. The group produced "Pictures at an Exhibition: Framed in Jazz" in 1963, a big band-style production of the Modest Mussorgsky piano suite.

Ferguson is credited, along with Hugh Heller, with writing the San Francisco "Giants Fight Song" in 1961.

During the 1970s, he collaborated extensively with composer Jack Elliott, co-writing the themes to Barney Miller and Charlie's Angels. University of Southern California music historian Jon Burlingame called the themes "iconic in the sense that most people who were around in that era can easily recall those tunes". Together with Eliott, he created scores for episodes of Banacek, Fish, Police Story, Big Hawaii, Starsky & Hutch, S.W.A.T. and The Rookies. The duo also collaborated to form the Foundation for New American Music in 1978. Ferguson was among the founders of the Grove School of Music in Los Angeles.

During the 1980s, he produced Emmy Award-nominated scores for Peter and Paul (1981), Ivanhoe (1982), Master of the Game (1984), The Last Days of Patton (1986), April Morning (1988) and Pancho Barnes (1988), winning in 1985 for his work on Camille. He worked on dozens of literary television films for Norman Rosemont, including The Count of Monte Cristo (1975), The Man in the Iron Mask (1977), Captains Courageous (1977), The Four Feathers (1978), Les Misérables (1978), All Quiet on the Western Front (1979), Little Lord Fauntleroy (1980), A Tale of Two Cities (1980) and Back to the Secret Garden (2001). He also composed scores for theatrical films, among them Support Your Local Gunfighter (1971), Get to Know Your Rabbit (1972) and Avalanche Express (1979).

He was music director for television presentations of the American Movie Awards, Emmy Award, Grammy Award, Kennedy Center Honors and the Oscars. Ferguson was musical director for Julie Andrews, Johnny Mathis and for Steve Lawrence and Eydie Gorme.

== Death ==
Ferguson died of natural causes at age 85 on June 23, 2010, at his home in Westlake Village, California. He was married with three children and six grandchildren.

== Discography ==
- Pictures at an Exhibition Framed in Jazz (1963)
- Kenneth Patchen Reads With Allyn Ferguson And The Chamber Jazz Sextet (1983)
- Master Of The Game (1984)
- The Film Music of Allyn Ferguson Volume 1 (1993)
- The Film Music of Allyn Ferguson Volume 2 (1994)
- The Film Music of Allyn Ferguson Volume 3 (1997)

== See also ==
- Charlie's Angels – American crime drama television series (1976–1981)
- Jack Elliott – American television producer, film composer, and music arranger (1927–2001)
