= David A. Rosemont =

American producer

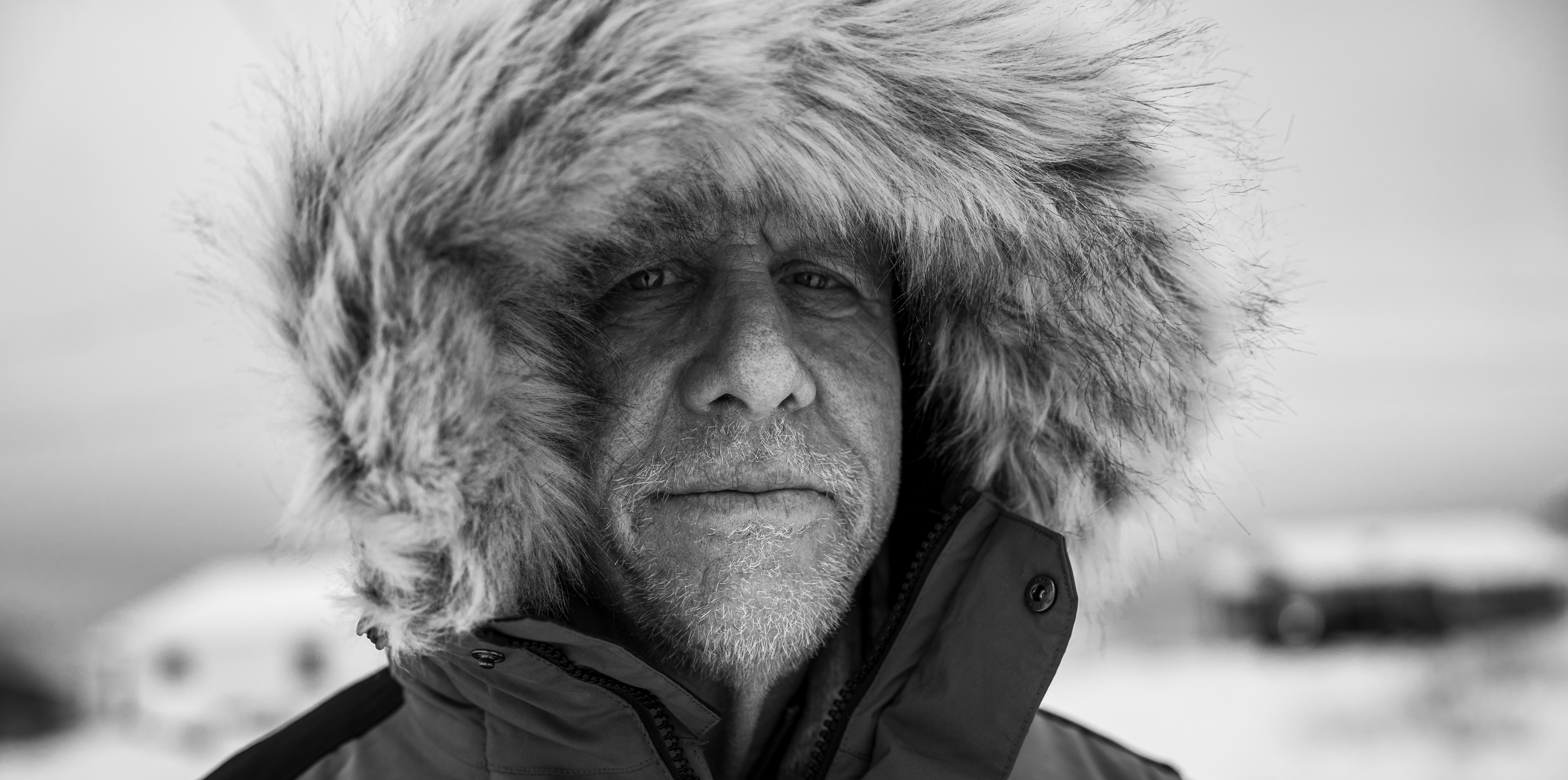
David A. Rosemont in 2022

David A. Rosemont is an American producer. He has been nominated for five Emmy Awards and four Golden Globes. Rosemont has won the Peabody award, two Critics Choice Awards, The Media Access Award, The Celebration of Diversity Award, The American Film Institute Award of Excellence, the Christopher Award, and the Emmy Award for Outstanding Made for Television Movie for the critically acclaimed Door to Door.

Rosemont has produced for almost every major television studio including ABC, NBC, CBS, Showtime, Lifetime, The History Channel, A&E, PBS, The Hallmark Hall of Fame, DreamWorks, Starz, Scott Free and Turner Network Television where he produced the epic twelve-hour mini series, (Into The West) executive produced by Steven Spielberg which was seen by a record 81 million people during its six-week run on TNT and nominated for 16 Emmys including Best Miniseries. Rosemont also produced the international six-hour miniseries The Company for Sony, TNT and Ridley Scott, starring Michael Keaton, Chris O'Donnell, and Alfred Molina.

Some of Rosemont’s films include Graham Greene's The Tenth Man, The West Side Waltz, Purgatory, Riders of the Purple Sage, The Long Road Home, Henry James' Turn of the Screw, Robin Cook's Harmful Intent, What Love Sees, The Mixed Up Files of Mrs. Basil E. Frankweiler, Passing Glory, The Wool Cap, The Seventh Stream, and a remake of High Noon...

Rosemont produced the film Gifted Hands: The Ben Carson Story starring Cuba Gooding, Jr and America starring Rosie O'Donnell. He produced the 8 hour international miniseries, (Pillars of the Earth) based on the bestselling novel by Ken Follett for Scott Free Productions and Tandem Communications and November Christmas for the Hallmark Hall of Fame Productions and CBS. Rosemont produced the family films; Field of Vision and Game Of Your Life for NBC/Procter & Gamble/Walmart, the Hallmark Hall of Fame production of Firelight on ABC, the remake of Steel Magnolias starring Queen Latifah with record breaking ratings, and a four-hour mini series, Bonnie & Clyde for The History Channel directed by Academy Award nominee Bruce Beresford which was nominated for four Emmy's including Best Mini Series.

Rosemont produced The Gabby Douglas Story about the 2012 Olympic champion who won an unprecedented two Gold medals in gymnastics for the United States. His recent films include In My Dreams, One Christmas Eve and a dramatic series for PBS and Scott Free Productions/Ridley Scott called Mercy Street, a medical drama set during the Civil War. Rosemont recently produced MANHUNT:UNABOMBER, a limited series for Discovery Channel and Lionsgate TV about the FBI’s pursuit and apprehension of Ted Kaczynski, the Unabomber. And Strange Angel, a series for CBS All Access and Scott Free Productions, based on the novel Strange Angel: The Otherworldly Life of Rocket Scientist John Whiteside Parsons by George Pendle. Rosemont is currently producing the series Stumptown for ABC starring Cobie Smulders.

== Filmography ==
Year	Film	Special Notes
1985	Corsican Brothers	
1986	Christmas Gift	
1988	My Africa	
1988	Graeme Greene's "The Tenth Man"	Nominated - 1989 Golden Globe for Best Mini-Series or Motion Picture Made for TV
1991	Ironclads	
1991	Shadow of a Doubt	
1991	Long Road Home	Won - 1992 Writers Guild of America
1992	Fergie and Andrew: Behind Closed Doors	
1993	Harmful Intent	
1994	The Birds II: Land's End	
1994	Trick of the Eye	
1995	From the Mixed-Up Files of Mrs. Basil E. Frankweiler	
1995	The West Side Waltz	
1995	Haunting of Helen Walker	
1996	Riders of the Purple Sage	Won - 1997 Bronze Wrangler
1996	What Love Sees	Won - 1997 Young Artists Award for Best Family TV Movie or Mini-Series - Network
1996	Host	
1998	Carriers	
1998	Virtual Obsession	
1999	Passing Glory	
1999	Purgatory	Won - 2000 Bronze Wrangler; Nominated - 2000 Golden Satellite Award for Best Miniseries
2000	High Noon	
2000	Race Against Time	
2000	For All Time	
2001	The Seventh Stream	
2002	Door to Door	Won - 2003 Primetime Emmy Award
2004	The Winning Season	Nominated - 2005 Young Artists Award for Best Family Television Movie or Special
2004	The Wool Cap	Nominated - 2005 Primetime Emmy Award; Nominated - 2005 Broadcast Film Critics Association Awards for Best Picture Made for Television
2005	Into the West	Won - 2006 Bronze Wrangler; Nominated - 2006 PGA Award; Nominated - 2006 Primetime Emmy Award
2007	The Company	Nominated - 2008 Golden Globes for Best Mini-Series or Motion Picture Made for Television; Nominated - 2007 Satellite Awards for Best Miniseries
2008	SIS	
2008	Sex and Lies in Sin City	
2009	Gifted Hands: The Ben Carson Story	
2009	America	Nominated - 2010 NAMIC Vision Awards for Original Movie or Special; Nominated - 2010 Prism Awards for TV Movie or Miniseries
2010	The Pillars of the Earth	Nominated - 2011 Primetime Emmy Award; Nominated - 2011 PGA Award; Nominated - 2011 Golden Globe for Best Mini-Series or Motion Picture Made for Television; Nominated 2011 Academy of Science Fiction, Fantasy & Horror Films, USA for Best Television Presentation; Won - 2011 Gemini Awards for Best Dramatic Mini-Series; Nominated - 2011 Online Film & Television Association for Best Motion Picture or Miniseries; Nominated - 2011 PGA Awards for Outstanding Producer of Long-Form Television; Nominated - 2011 Satellite Awards for Best Miniseries; Nominated - 2011 TP de Oro, Spain for Best Foreign Series (Mejor Serie Extranjera)
2010	November Christmas	
2011	Taken from Me: The Tiffany Rubin Story	Nominated - 2012 NAMIC Vision Awards for Original Movie or Special
2011	Field of Vision	
2012	Steel Magnolias	Nominated - 2013 Black Reel Award; Won - 2013 Image Awards for Outstanding Television Movie, Mini-Series or Dramatic Special; Nominated - 2013 NAMIC Vision Awards for Original Movie or Special
2012	Firelight	Nominated - 2013 Image Awards for Outstanding Television Movie, Mini-Series or Dramatic Special
2013	Bonnie and Clyde	Nominated - 2014 Primetime Emmy Award for Outstanding Miniseries
2014	The Gabby Douglas Story	
2014	In My Dreams	
2014	One Christmas Eve	
2015	Cleveland Abduction	
2015	Mercy Street	
2017	Manhunt:Unabomber	
2018 - 2019	Strange Angel	
2019 - 2020	Stumptown	
2021	The Hot Zone	
2022	Alaska Daily	

== Selected awards ==
Outcome	Award
Won	Riders of the Purple Sage: Bronze Wrangler for Best Television Feature Film (1997)
Won	Purgatory: Bronze Wrangler for Best Television Feature Film (2000)
Won	Door to Door: Primetime Emmy Award for Outstanding Made for Television Movie (2003)
Nominated	The Wool Cap: Primetime Emmy Award for Outstanding Made for Television Movie (2005)
Nominated	Into the West: Producers Guild of America Award for Outstanding Producer of Long-Form Television (2006)
Nominated	Into the West: Primetime Emmy Award for Outstanding Miniseries (2006)
Won	Into the West: Bronze Wrangler Award for Best Television Feature Film (2006)
Nominated	The Pillars of the Earth Primetime Emmy Award for Outstanding Miniseries or Movie (2011)
Nominated	The Pillars of the Earth: Producers Guild of America Award for Outstanding Producer of Long-Form Television (2011)
Nominated	Steel Magnolias: Black Reel Award for Outstanding Television or Mini-Series Film (2013)
Nominated	"Bonnie and Clyde": Primetime Emmy Award for Outstanding Miniseries (2014)
