= Primetime Emmy Award for Outstanding Music Composition for a Limited or Anthology Series, Movie or Special (Original Dramatic Score) =

American television award

Primetime Emmy Award for Music Composition for a Limited or Anthology Series, Movie or Special (Original Dramatic Score)
- Awarded for: Outstanding Music Composition for a Limited or Anthology Series, Movie or Special (Original Dramatic Score)
- Country: United States
- Presented by: Academy of Television Arts & Sciences
- First award: 1955
- Currently held by: The Beast in Me (2026)
- Website: emmys.com

This is a list of winners and nominees of the Primetime Emmy Award for Outstanding Music Composition for a Limited or Anthology Series, Movie or Special (Original Dramatic Score).

Starting in 2019, the category recognizes scripted programs. Unscripted programs compete for Music Composition for a Documentary Series or Special (Original Dramatic Score).

== Winners and nominations ==
=== 1950s ===
Year	Program	Nominee(s)	Network
1955	Dragnet	Walter Schumann	NBC
1955	Amahl and the Night Visitors	Gian-Carlo Menotti	NBC
1955	A Christmas Carol	Bernard Herrmann	CBS
1955	Light's Diamond Jubilee	Victor Young	(Note: Light's Diamond Jubilee was simulcast on ABC, CBS, DuMont and NBC.)
1955	Medic	Victor Young	NBC
1956	No Award Given		
1957	No Award Given		
1958	No Award Given		
1959	No Award Given		

Note: The award presented in 1955 was for "Best Original Music Composed for TV"

=== 1960s ===
Year	Program	Nominee(s)	Network
1960	No Award Given		
1961	No Award Given		
1962	Winston Churchill: The Valiant Years	Richard Rodgers	ABC
1962	The Price of Tomatoes	Leith Stevens	NBC
1962	Project XX	Robert Russell Bennett	NBC
1962	Second Chance	John Williams	ABC
1962	Vincent Van Gogh: A Self-Portrait	Jacques Belasco	NBC
1963	Project XX	Robert Russell Bennett	NBC
1963	The Dick Powell Show	Joseph Mullendore	NBC
1963	Flashing Spikes	John Williams	ABC
1963	Labyrinth	Gian-Carlo Menotti	NBC
1964
1964	The Making of the President 1960	Elmer Bernstein	ABC
1964	East Side/West Side	Kenyon Hopkins	CBS
1964	Elizabeth Taylor in London	John Barry	CBS
1964	Greece: The Golden Age	George Kleinsinger	NBC
1964	The Kremlin	Georges Auric	NBC
1964	Saga of a Western Man	Ulpio Minucci, Joe Moon and Rayburn Wright	ABC
1965	No Award Given		
1966	No Award Given		
1967	No Award Given		
1968	No Award Given		
1969	No Award Given		

Note: Award titled Outstanding Achievement in Original Music Composed for Television 1962–64

=== 1970s ===
Year	Program	Episode	Nominee(s)	Network
1970 (22nd)
1970 (22nd)	The Challengers		Pete Rugolo	CBS
1970 (22nd)	Gene Kelly's Wonderful World of Girls		Van Alexander	NBC
1971 (23rd)
1971 (23rd)	The Undersea World of Jacques Cousteau	"The Tragedy of the Red Salmon"	Walter Scharf	ABC
1971 (23rd)	Do You Take This Stranger?		Pete Rugolo	NBC
1971 (23rd)	Hamlet		John Addison	NBC
1972 (24th)
1972 (24th)	Jane Eyre		John Williams	NBC
1972 (24th)	Brian's Song		Michel Legrand	ABC
1972 (24th)	The Snow Goose		Carl Davis	NBC
1973 (25th)
1973 (25th)	The Red Pony		Jerry Goldsmith	NBC
1973 (25th)	A Brand New Life		Billy Goldenberg	ABC
1973 (25th)	Liza with a Z		John Kander and Fred Ebb	NBC
1974 (26th)
1974 (26th)	The Autobiography of Miss Jane Pittman		Fred Karlin	CBS
1974 (26th)	The Migrants		Billy Goldenberg	CBS
1974 (26th)	Portrait: A Man Whose Name Was John		Laurence Rosenthal	ABC
1975 (27th)
1975 (27th)	QB VII	"Part 1 & 2"	Jerry Goldsmith	ABC
1975 (27th)	Queen of the Stardust Ballroom		Billy Goldenberg	CBS
1976 (28th)
1976 (28th)	Babe		Jerry Goldsmith	CBS
1976 (28th)	Dark Victory		Billy Goldenberg	NBC
1976 (28th)	Gypsy in My Soul		Cy Coleman	CBS
1976 (28th)	The Supercops		Jack Urbont	CBS
1977 (29th)
1977 (29th)	Sybil		Leonard Rosenman and Alan and Marilyn Bergman	NBC
1977 (29th)	Eleanor and Franklin: The White House Years		John Barry	ABC
1977 (29th)	Helter Skelter		Billy Goldenberg	CBS
1977 (29th)	Minstrel Man		Fred Karlin	CBS
1977 (29th)	Raid on Entebbe		David Shire	NBC
1978 (30th)
1978 (30th)	See How She Runs		Jimmie Haskell	CBS
1978 (30th)	Actor		Billy Goldenberg	PBS
1978 (30th)	The Defection of Simas Kudirka		David Shire	CBS
1978 (30th)	Ziegfeld: The Man and His Women		Dick DeBenedictis	NBC
1979 (31st)
1979 (31st)	Friendly Fire		Leonard Rosenman	ABC
1979 (31st)	First, You Cry		Peter Matz	CBS
1979 (31st)	The Hal Linden Special		Ken Welch and Mitzie Welch	ABC
1979 (31st)	The Word		Alex North	CBS

=== 1980s ===
Year	Program	Episode	Nominee(s)	Network
1980 (32nd)
1980 (32nd)	High Midnight		Jerry Fielding (posthumously)	CBS
1980 (32nd)	The Last Convertible	"Part 1"	Pete Rugolo	NBC
1980 (32nd)	Salem's Lot		Harry Sukman	CBS
1980 (32nd)	The Silent Lovers		Gerald Fried	NBC
1981 (33rd)
1981 (33rd)	Masada	"Part 2"	Jerry Goldsmith	ABC
1981 (33rd)	Father Damien: The Leper Priest		Peter Matz	NBC
1981 (33rd)	Homeward Bound		Fred Karlin	CBS
1981 (33rd)	Masada	"Part 4"	Morton Stevens	ABC
1981 (33rd)	The Tempest Live with the San Francisco Ballet (Great Performances)		Paul Chihara	PBS
1982 (34th)
1982 (34th)	The Princess and the Cabbie		Patrick Williams	CBS
1982 (34th)	Ivanhoe		Allyn Ferguson	CBS
1982 (34th)	Jacqueline Bouvier Kennedy		Billy Goldenberg	ABC
1982 (34th)	Killjoy		Bruce Broughton	CBS
1982 (34th)	The Letter		Laurence Rosenthal	ABC
1982 (34th)	A Woman Called Golda		Michel Legrand	Syndicated
1983 (35th)
1983 (35th)	Rage of Angels		Billy Goldenberg	NBC
1983 (35th)	The Blue and the Gray	"Part 2"	Bruce Broughton	CBS
1983 (35th)	Drop-Out Father		Peter Matz	CBS
1983 (35th)	The Thorn Birds	"Part 1"	Henry Mancini	ABC
1983 (35th)	V		Joe Harnell	NBC
1983 (35th)	Who Will Love My Children?		Laurence Rosenthal	ABC
1984 (36th)
1984 (36th)	The First Olympics: Athens 1896	"Part 1"	Bruce Broughton	NBC
1984 (36th)	Concealed Enemies	"Investigation"	Jonathan Tunick	PBS
1984 (36th)	Master of the Game	"Part 1"	Allyn Ferguson	CBS
1984 (36th)	The Mystic Warrior	"Part 1"	Gerald Fried	ABC
1984 (36th)	Something About Amelia		Mark Snow	ABC
1985 (37th)
1985 (37th)	Camille		Allyn Ferguson	CBS
1985 (37th)	Do You Remember Love		David Shire	CBS
1985 (37th)	Murder with Mirrors		Richard Rodney Bennett	CBS
1985 (37th)	Seduced		Patrick Williams	CBS
1986 (38th)
1986 (38th)	Peter the Great	"Part 1"	Laurence Rosenthal	NBC
1986 (38th)	Death of a Salesman		Alex North	CBS
1986 (38th)	An Early Frost		John Kander	NBC
1986 (38th)	A Letter to Three Wives		Johnny Mandel	NBC
1986 (38th)	North and South	"Part 1"	Bill Conti	ABC
1987 (39th)
1987 (39th)	Anastasia: The Mystery of Anna	"Part 1"	Laurence Rosenthal	NBC
1987 (39th)	The Last Days of Patton		Allyn Ferguson	CBS
1987 (39th)	LBJ: The Early Years		Johnny Mandel	NBC
1987 (39th)	Nutcracker: Money, Madness and Murder	"Part 2"	Billy Goldenberg	NBC
1987 (39th)	Under the Influence		Nan Schwartz	CBS
1988 (40th)
1988 (40th)	The Bourne Identity	"Part 1"	Laurence Rosenthal	ABC
1988 (40th)	April Morning		Allyn Ferguson	CBS
1988 (40th)	Foxfire		Johnny Mandel	CBS
1988 (40th)	Napoleon and Josephine: A Love Story	"Part 3"	Gerald Fried	ABC
1988 (40th)	Perry Mason: The Case of the Avenging Ace		Dick DeBenedictis	NBC
1989 (41st)
1989 (41st)	Lonesome Dove	"The Return"	Basil Poledouris	CBS
1989 (41st)	Bridge to Silence		Fred Karlin	CBS
1989 (41st)	The Hijacking of the Achille Lauro		Chris Boardman	NBC
1989 (41st)	Pancho Barnes		Allyn Ferguson	CBS
1989 (41st)	War and Remembrance	"Part 11"	Bob Cobert	ABC

=== 1990s ===
Year	Program	Episode	Nominee(s)	Network
1990 (42nd)
1990 (42nd)	The Shell Seekers		James Di Pasquale	ABC
1990 (42nd)	Do You Know the Muffin Man?		Lee Holdridge	CBS
1990 (42nd)	The Kennedys of Massachusetts	"Part 3"	David Shire	ABC
1990 (42nd)	Last Flight Out		Christopher Young	NBC
1990 (42nd)	The Old Man and the Sea		Bruce Broughton	NBC
1990 (42nd)	People Like Us	"Part 2"	Billy Goldenberg	NBC
1990 (42nd)	The Phantom of the Opera	"Part 2"	John Addison	NBC
1991 (43rd)
1991 (43rd)	It	"Part 1"	Richard Bellis	ABC
1991 (43rd)	Decoration Day		Patrick Williams	NBC
1991 (43rd)	Johnny Ryan		Chris Boardman	NBC
1991 (43rd)	The Killing Mind		James Di Pasquale	Lifetime
1991 (43rd)	Lies Before Kisses		Don Davis	CBS
1992 (44th)
1992 (44th)	O Pioneers!		Bruce Broughton	CBS
1992 (44th)	Doublecrossed		Richard Bellis	HBO
1992 (44th)	Fire in the Dark		Arthur Kempel	CBS
1992 (44th)	A Little Piece of Heaven		Don Davis	NBC
1992 (44th)	Survive the Savage Sea		Fred Karlin	ABC
1993 (45th)
1993 (45th)	Danielle Steele's Jewels	"Part 1"	Patrick Williams	NBC
1993 (45th)	An American Story		Mark Snow	CBS
1993 (45th)	Call of the Wild		Lee Holdridge	CBS
1993 (45th)	Mortal Sins		Joseph Conlan	USA
1993 (45th)	The Sea Wolf		Charles Bernstein	TNT
1994 (46th)
1994 (46th)	Lush Life		Lennie Niehaus	Showtime
1994 (46th)	Double, Double, Toil and Trouble		Richard Bellis	ABC
1994 (46th)	Geronimo		Patrick Williams	TNT
1994 (46th)	Oldest Living Confederate Widow Tells All	"Part 1"	Mark Snow	CBS
1994 (46th)	Stephen King's The Stand	"Part 4"	W. G. Snuffy Walden	ABC
1995 (47th)
1995 (47th)	Young Indiana Jones and the Hollywood Follies		Laurence Rosenthal	Family
1995 (47th)	Buffalo Girls	"Part 1"	Lee Holdridge	CBS
1995 (47th)	Children of the Dust	"Part 1"	Mark Snow	CBS
1995 (47th)	Kingfish: A Story of Huey P. Long		Patrick Williams	TNT
1995 (47th)	30 Years of National Geographic Specials		Jay Chattaway	NBC
1996 (48th)
1996 (48th)	The Canterville Ghost		Ernest Troost	ABC
1996 (48th)	Annie: A Royal Adventure!		David Michael Frank	ABC
1996 (48th)	Larry McMurtry's Dead Man's Walk	"Part 1"	David Bell	ABC
1996 (48th)	Norma Jean & Marilyn		Christopher Young	HBO
1996 (48th)	The Tuskegee Airmen		Lee Holdridge	HBO
1997 (49th)
1997 (49th)	The Young Indiana Jones Chronicles: Travels with Father		Laurence Rosenthal	Family
1997 (49th)	After Jimmy		Patrick Williams	CBS
1997 (49th)	Calm at Sunset		Ernest Troost	CBS
1997 (49th)	Quicksilver Highway		Mark Mothersbaugh	Fox
1997 (49th)	True Women		Bruce Broughton	CBS
1998 (50th)
1998 (50th)	Glory & Honor		Bruce Broughton	TNT
1998 (50th)	Forbidden Territory: Stanley's Search for Livingstone		Mark Adler	ABC
1998 (50th)	From the Earth to the Moon	"1968"	Michael Kamen	HBO
1998 (50th)	House of Frankenstein	"Part 2"	Don Davis	NBC
1998 (50th)	Merlin	"Part 1"	Trevor Jones	NBC
1999 (51st)
1999 (51st)	Alice in Wonderland		Richard Hartley	NBC
1999 (51st)	David and Lisa		Marco Beltrami	ABC
1999 (51st)	Mutiny		Lee Holdridge	NBC
1999 (51st)	Rear Window		David Shire	ABC
1999 (51st)	Winnie the Pooh: A Valentine for You		Carl Johnson	ABC

=== 2000s ===
Year	Program	Episode	Nominee(s)	Network
2000 (52nd)
2000 (52nd)	RKO 281		John Altman	HBO
2000 (52nd)	Beyond the Prairie: The True Story of Laura Ingalls Wilder		Ernest Troost	CBS
2000 (52nd)	Don Quixote		Richard Hartley	TNT
2000 (52nd)	Enslavement: The True Story of Fanny Kemble		Charles Bernstein	Showtime
2000 (52nd)	Walking with Dinosaurs		Ben Bartlett	Discovery
2001 (53rd)
2001 (53rd)	For Love or Country: The Arturo Sandoval Story		Arturo Sandoval	HBO
2001 (53rd)	Bailey's Mistake		Mason Daring	ABC
2001 (53rd)	Haven		Lawrence Shragge	CBS
2001 (53rd)	Jackie, Ethel, Joan: The Women of Camelot		Martin Davich	NBC
2001 (53rd)	Papa's Angels		Velton Ray Bunch	CBS
2002 (54th)
2002 (54th)	Shackleton	"Part 2"	Adrian Johnston	A&E
2002 (54th)	Dinner with Friends		Dave Grusin	HBO
2002 (54th)	Last Call		Brian Tyler	Showtime
2002 (54th)	Jack and the Beanstalk: The Real Story	"Part 2"	Rupert Gregson-Williams	CBS
2002 (54th)	The Mists of Avalon	"Part 1"	Lee Holdridge	TNT
2002 (54th)	We Were the Mulvaneys		Patrick Williams	Lifetime
2003 (55th)
2003 (55th)	Eloise at the Plaza		Bruce Broughton	ABC
2003 (55th)	Hitler: The Rise of Evil		Normand Corbeil	CBS
2003 (55th)	The Lost World	"Part 2"	Robert Lane	A&E
2003 (55th)	Martin and Lewis		Ernest Troost	CBS
2003 (55th)	The Roman Spring of Mrs. Stone		John Altman	Showtime
2004 (56th)
2004 (56th)	Eloise at Christmastime		Bruce Broughton	ABC
2004 (56th)	Dance in America: Lar Lubovitch's Othello (Great Performances)		Elliot Goldenthal	PBS
2004 (56th)	Fallen Angel		Ernest Troost	CBS
2004 (56th)	Helter Skelter		Mark Snow	CBS
2004 (56th)	The Last King	"Part 2"	Robert Lane	A&E
2004 (56th)	The Nazi Officer's Wife		Sheldon Mirowitz	A&E
2005 (57th)
2005 (57th)	Warm Springs		Bruce Broughton	HBO
2005 (57th)	Miracle Run		Joseph Conlan	Lifetime
2005 (57th)	Pride		George Fenton	A&E
2005 (57th)	Revelations	"Part 1"	Joseph Vitarelli	NBC
2005 (57th)	Salem's Lot		Christopher Gordon and Lisa Gerrard	TNT
2005 (57th)	Sometimes in April		Bruno Coulais	HBO
2006 (58th)
2006 (58th)	Into the West		Geoff Zanelli	TNT
2006 (58th)	The Dive from Clausen's Pier		Bruce Broughton	Lifetime
2006 (58th)	Human Trafficking	"Part 1"	Normand Corbeil	Lifetime
2006 (58th)	Sleeper Cell	"Al-Faitha"	Paul Haslinger	Showtime
2006 (58th)	The Water Is Wide		Jeff Beal	CBS
2007 (59th)
2007 (59th)	Nightmares & Dreamscapes: From the Stories of Stephen King	"Battleground"	Jeff Beal	TNT
2007 (59th)	Boffo! Tinseltown's Bombs and Blockbusters		Todd Boekelheide	HBO
2007 (59th)	Broken Trail		David Mansfield and Van Dyke Parks	AMC
2007 (59th)	Bury My Heart at Wounded Knee		George S. Clinton	HBO
2007 (59th)	The Librarian: Return to King Solomon's Mines		Joseph LoDuca	TNT
2007 (59th)	Longford		Robert Lane	HBO
2007 (59th)	The Path to 9/11		John Cameron	ABC
2008 (60th)
2008 (60th)	The Company	"Part 1"	Jeff Beal	TNT
2008 (60th)	Bernard and Doris		Alex Wurman	HBO
2008 (60th)	For One More Day		Lennie Niehaus	ABC
2008 (60th)	John Adams	"Independence"	Robert Lane	HBO
2008 (60th)	Masters of Science Fiction	"Jerry Was a Man"	Laura Karpman	Showtime
2008 (60th)	Sense and Sensibility		Martin Phipps	PBS
2009 (61st)
2009 (61st)	Into the Storm		Howard Goodall	HBO
2009 (61st)	Grey Gardens		Rachel Portman	HBO
2009 (61st)	Little Dorrit	"Part 5"	John Lunn	PBS
2009 (61st)	Loving Leah		Jeff Beal	CBS
2009 (61st)	Taking Chance		Marcelo Zarvos	HBO
2009 (61st)	24: Redemption		Sean Callery	Fox

=== 2010s ===
Year	Program	Episode	Nominee(s)	Network
2010 (62nd)
2010 (62nd)	Temple Grandin		Alex Wurman	HBO
2010 (62nd)	Blessed Is the Match (Independent Lens)		Todd Boekelheide	PBS
2010 (62nd)	Georgia O'Keeffe		Jeff Beal	Lifetime
2010 (62nd)	The Pacific	"Part 10"	Blake Neely, Geoff Zanelli, and Hans Zimmer	HBO
2010 (62nd)	When Love Is Not Enough: The Lois Wilson Story		Lawrence Shragge	CBS
2010 (62nd)	You Don't Know Jack		Marcelo Zarvos	HBO
2011 (63rd)
2011 (63rd)	Mildred Pierce	"Part 5"	Carter Burwell	HBO
2011 (63rd)	Any Human Heart	"Part 2"	Dan Jones	PBS
2011 (63rd)	The Pillars of the Earth	"Anarchy"	Trevor Morris	Starz
2011 (63rd)	Sherlock	A Study in Pink	David Arnold and Michael Price	PBS
2011 (63rd)	Thurgood		Rob Mathes	HBO
2012 (64th)
2012 (64th)	Hemingway & Gellhorn		Javier Navarrete	HBO
2012 (64th)	Game Change		Theodore Shapiro	HBO
2012 (64th)	Hatfields & McCoys	"Part 1"	John Debney and Tony Morales	History
2012 (64th)	Missing	"The Hard Drive"	Robert Duncan and Kim Planert	ABC
2012 (64th)	Prep & Landing: Naughty vs. Nice		Michael Giacchino	ABC
2012 (64th)	Sherlock	A Scandal in Belgravia	David Arnold and Michael Price	PBS
2013 (65th)
2013 (65th)	World Without End	"Medieval Life and Death"	Mychael Danna	Reelz
2013 (65th)	The Girl		Phillip Miller	HBO
2013 (65th)	Mea Maxima Culpa: Silence in the House of God		Ivor Guest and Robert Logan	HBO
2013 (65th)	Parade's End	"Part 5"	Dirk Brossé	HBO
2013 (65th)	Restless		Lorne Balfe	Sundance
2013 (65th)	Ring of Fire		Anton Sanko	Lifetime
2014 (66th)
2014 (66th)	Sherlock	"His Last Vow"	David Arnold and Michael Price	PBS
2014 (66th)	American Horror Story: Coven	"The Seven Wonders"	James S. Levine	FX
2014 (66th)	Clear History		Ludovic Bource	HBO
2014 (66th)	Fargo	"The Crocodile's Dilemma"	Jeff Russo	FX
2014 (66th)	Herblock: The Black & the White		Rob Mathes	HBO
2014 (66th)	The White Queen	"The Final Battle"	John Lunn	Starz
2015 (67th)
2015 (67th)	Bessie		Rachel Portman	HBO
2015 (67th)	American Horror Story: Freak Show	"Orphans"	Mac Quayle	FX
2015 (67th)	Away and Back		William Ross	Hallmark
2015 (67th)	The Missing	"Eden"	Dominik Scherrer	Starz
2015 (67th)	Sofia the First	"The Curse of Princess Ivy"	Kevin Kliesch	Disney Channel
2015 (67th)	24: Live Another Day	"11:00 a.m. – 12:00 p.m."	Sean Callery	Fox
2016 (68th)
2016 (68th)	The Night Manager	"Part 2"	Victor Reyes	AMC
2016 (68th)	All the Way		James Newton Howard	HBO
2016 (68th)	Descendants		David Lawrence	Disney
2016 (68th)	Fargo	"Loplop"	Jeff Russo	FX
2016 (68th)	Jesse Stone: Lost in Paradise		Jeff Beal	Hallmark
2016 (68th)	War & Peace	"Part 1"	Martin Phipps	Lifetime
2017 (69th)
2017 (69th)	Fargo	"Aporia"	Jeff Russo	FX
2017 (69th)	Feud: Bette and Joan	"Pilot"	Mac Quayle	FX
2017 (69th)	Five Came Back	"The Price of Victory"	Jeremy Turner	Netflix
2017 (69th)	O.J.: Made in America	"Part 3"	Gary Lionelli	ESPN
2017 (69th)	Suite Française		Rael Jones	Lifetime
2017 (69th)	The White Helmets		Patrick Jonsson	Netflix
2018 (70th)
2018 (70th)	March of the Penguins 2: The Next Step		Cyril Aufort	Hulu
2018 (70th)	Alias Grace	"Part 1"	Mychael Danna and Jeff Danna	Netflix
2018 (70th)	The Commuter (Philip K. Dick's Electric Dreams)		Harry Gregson-Williams	Prime Video
2018 (70th)	Crazy Diamond (Philip K. Dick's Electric Dreams)		Cristobal Tapia de Veer	Prime Video
2018 (70th)	Godless	"Homecoming"	Carlos Rafael Rivera	Netflix
2018 (70th)	USS Callister (Black Mirror)		Daniel Pemberton	Netflix
2019 (71st)
2019 (71st)	Chernobyl	"Please Remain Calm"	Hildur Guðnadóttir	HBO
2019 (71st)	Escape at Dannemora	"Episode 5"	Edward Shearmur	Showtime
2019 (71st)	Good Omens	"In the Beginning"	David Arnold	Prime Video
2019 (71st)	True Detective	"The Final Country"	T Bone Burnett and Keefus Ciancia	HBO
2019 (71st)	When They See Us	"Part 2"	Kris Bowers	Netflix

=== 2020s ===
Year	Program	Episode	Nominee(s)	Network
2020 (72nd)
2020 (72nd)	Watchmen	"It's Summer and We're Running Out of Ice"	Trent Reznor and Atticus Ross	HBO
2020 (72nd)	Hollywood	"Hooray for Hollywood, Part 2"	Nathan Barr	Netflix
2020 (72nd)	Little Fires Everywhere	"The Spider Web"	Mark Isham and Isabella Summers	Hulu
2020 (72nd)	Mrs. America	"Reagan"	Kris Bowers	FX
2020 (72nd)	Unorthodox	"Part 1"	Antonio Gambale	Netflix
2021 (73rd)
2021 (73rd)	The Queen's Gambit	"End Game"	Carlos Rafael Rivera	Netflix
2021 (73rd)	Fargo	"East/West"	Jeff Russo	FX
2021 (73rd)	Oslo		Jeff Russo and Zoë Keating	HBO
2021 (73rd)	The Underground Railroad	"Chapter 2: South Carolina"	Nicholas Britell	Prime Video
2021 (73rd)	WandaVision	"Previously On"	Christophe Beck	Disney+
2022 (74th)
2022 (74th)	The White Lotus	"Mysterious Monkeys"	Cristobal Tapia de Veer	HBO
2022 (74th)	1883	"1883"	Brian Tyler and Breton Vivian	Paramount+
2022 (74th)	Moon Knight	"Asylum"	Hesham Nazih	Disney+
2022 (74th)	Station Eleven	"Unbroken Circle"	Dan Romer	HBO Max
2022 (74th)	A Very British Scandal	"Episode 1"	Nathan Barr	Prime Video
2023 (75th)
2023 (75th)	Weird: The Al Yankovic Story		Leo Birenberg and Zach Robinson	Roku
2023 (75th)	Hocus Pocus 2		John Debney	Disney+
2023 (75th)	Ms. Marvel	"Time and Again"	Laura Karpman	Disney+
2023 (75th)	Prey		Sarah Schachner	Hulu
2023 (75th)	A Small Light	"What Can Be Saved"	Ariel Marx	Nat Geo
2024 (76th)
2024 (76th)	Lessons in Chemistry	"Book of Calvin"	Carlos Rafael Rivera	Apple TV+
2024 (76th)	All the Light We Cannot See	"Episode 4"	James Newton Howard	Netflix
2024 (76th)	Fargo	"Blanket"	Jeff Russo	FX
2024 (76th)	Lawmen: Bass Reeves	"Part I"	Chanda Dancy	Paramount+
2024 (76th)	The Tattooist of Auschwitz	"Episode 1"	Kara Talve and Hans Zimmer	Peacock
2025 (77th)
2025 (77th)	The Penguin	"After Hours"	Mick Giacchino	HBO
2025 (77th)	Black Mirror	"Hotel Reverie"	Ariel Marx	Netflix
2025 (77th)	Black Mirror	"USS Callister: Into Infinity"	Daniel Pemberton	Netflix
2025 (77th)	Dying for Sex	"It's Not That Serious"	Ariel Marx	FX
2025 (77th)	Monsters: The Lyle and Erik Menendez Story	"Spree"	Thomas Newman and Julia Newman	Netflix
2025 (77th)	The Supremes at Earl's All-You-Can-Eat		Kathryn Bostic	Hulu
2026 (78th)
2026 (78th)	The Beast in Me	"The Beast and Me"	Sean Callery and Sara Barone	Netflix
2026 (78th)	All Her Fault	"Episode 7"	Jeff Beal	Peacock
2026 (78th)	Black Rabbit	"Isle of Joy"	Danny Bensi and Saunder Jurriaans	Netflix
2026 (78th)	In the Blink of an Eye		Thomas Newman	Hulu
2026 (78th)	Washington Black	"If You See My Mama, Whisper Her This..."	Cameron Moody	Hulu

== Programs with multiple nominations ==
5 nominations

- Fargo

3 nominations

- Black Mirror
- Sherlock

2 nominations

- American Horror Story
- Masada
- Philip K. Dick's Electric Dreams

== Composers with multiple awards ==
6 awards

- Bruce Broughton (3 consecutive)

5 awards

- Laurence Rosenthal (3 consecutive)

4 awards

- Jerry Goldsmith (2 consecutive)

2 awards

- Jeff Beal (consecutive)
- Carlos Rafael Rivera
- Leonard Rosenman
- Patrick Williams

== Composers with multiple nominations ==
11 nominations

- Bruce Broughton

10 nominations

- Billy Goldenberg

8 nominations

- Laurence Rosenthal
- Patrick Williams

7 nominations

- Jeff Beal

6 nominations

- Allyn Ferguson
- Lee Holdridge
- Jeff Russo

5 nominations

- Jerry Goldsmith
- Fred Karlin
- David Shire
- Mark Snow
- Ernest Troost

4 nominations

- David Arnold
- Robert Lane

3 nominations

- Richard Bellis
- Sean Callery
- Don Davis
- Johnny Mandel
- Ariel Marx
- Peter Matz
- Michael Price
- Carlos Rafael Rivera
- Pete Rugolo
- John Williams

2 nominations

- John Addison
- John Altman
- Nathan Barr
- John Barry
- Robert Russell Bennett
- Charles Bernstein
- Chris Boardman
- Todd Boekelheide
- Kris Bowers
- Joseph Conlan
- Normand Corbeil
- Mychael Danna
- Dick DeBenedictis
- John Debney
- James Di Pasquale
- Gerald Fried
- Richard Hartley
- John Kander
- Laura Karpman
- Michel Legrand
- John Lunn
- Rob Mathes
- Gian-Carlo Menotti
- James Newton Howard
- Thomas Newman
- Lennie Niehaus
- Alex North
- Mac Quayle
- Daniel Pemberton
- Martin Phipps
- Rachel Portman
- Leonard Rosenman
- Lawrence Shragge
- Harry Sukman
- Cristobal Tapia de Veer
- Brian Tyler
- Alex Wurman
- Christopher Young
- Victor Young
- Geoff Zanelli
- Marcelo Zarvos
- Hans Zimmer
