= Let Them All Talk (disambiguation) =

Let Them All Talk is a 2020 American comedy-drama film directed by Steven Soderbergh.

Let Them All Talk may also refer to:

- Let Them All Talk (soundtrack), 2020 music by Thomas Newman for above film
- "Let Them All Talk", 1983 song by Elvis Costello on his eighth studio album Punch the Clock

== See also ==
- Let Them Talk (disambiguation)
