= Eloise at the Plaza =

2003 American TV movie

- DVD cover
- Genre: Comedy
- Based on: Eloise by Kay Thompson
- Written by: Janet Brownell
- Directed by: Kevin Lima
- Starring: Julie Andrews; Jeffrey Tambor; Kenneth Welsh; Debra Monk; Christine Baranski; Sofia Vassilieva
- Music by: Bruce Broughton
- Country of origin: United States
- Original language: English

Production
- Executive producers: Patrick Meehan; Denise Di Novi
- Producers: Christine Sacani; Thomas D. Adelman
- Cinematography: James Chressanthis
- Editor: Gregory Perler
- Running time: 89 minutes
- Production companies: HandMade Films; Di Novi Pictures

Original release
- Network: ABC
- Release: April 27, 2003

Related
- Eloise at Christmastime

Eloise at the Plaza is a 2003 American comedy television film based on the Eloise series of children's books written by Kay Thompson and illustrated by Hilary Knight. It stars Sofia Vassilieva as Eloise, a mischievous six-year-old girl who lives in the penthouse at the top of the Plaza Hotel in New York City. Julie Andrews, Jeffrey Tambor, Kenneth Welsh, Debra Monk, and Christine Baranski also star.

The film was directed by Kevin Lima, written by Janet Brownell, and produced by HandMade Films and DiNovi Pictures for Walt Disney Television. Filming took place in Toronto and New York City. It aired on ABC on April 27, 2003, as an episode of The Wonderful World of Disney. A sequel, Eloise at Christmastime, aired that November.

== Plot ==
Eloise is a six-year-old girl who lives at the Plaza Hotel in New York City. While under the care of her nanny, she becomes involved in various adventures, including attempting to play matchmaker for a lonely prince and securing an invitation to a major society event.

== Cast ==
- Sofia Vassilieva as Eloise
- Julie Andrews as Nanny
- Jeffrey Tambor as Mr. Salomone
- Christine Baranski as Prunella Stickler
- Kenneth Welsh as Sir Wilkes
- Jonas Chernick as Philip
- Stephanie Anne Mills as Molly Daniels
- Debra Monk as Maggie
- Gavin Creel as Bill
- Jessica Beitchman as Debutante Linda
- Sheree Smith as Laundry Supervisor
- Eve Crawford as Mrs. Daniels
- David Sparrow as Charlie, the 59th Street Doorman
- Kintaro Akiyama as Leon
- Denis Akiyama as Prince of Kushin
- Thomas D. Adelman as Pamphlet Guy
- Araxi Arslanian as Head of Housekeeping
- Tannis Burnett as Miss Thompson
- George Chiang as Mr. Toyama
- Corinne Conley as Mrs. Thornton
- Sergio Di Zio as Lou the Bellhop
- Greg Farkas as Ruth's Date
- Amber Fraser as Eloise's Mother
- Rothaford Gray as Security Guard
- Graham Harley as Walter the Concierge
- Fionnuala Jamison as Guest with Mail
- Jason Jones as Bartender
- Peter Keleghan as Mr. Nye
- Colm Magner as Thomas the Maitre'd
- Debra McGrath as Cornelia
- Patrick Meehan as Male Tourist
- David Michie as Cook
- Jeffrey Ong as Dancer
- Julian Richings as Patrice
- Sol Rosenthal as Palm Court Waiter
- Cara Rubenstein as Female Tourist
- Cliff Saunders as Max
- Tony Sciara as Assistant Chef Marco
- Sam Strasfield as Linda's Date
- Jim Tooey as Doorman
- Janet van de Graaf as Beautician
- Genelle Williams as Ruth
- Jonathan Wilson as Frederic the Bellhop
- Victor A. Young as Mr. Peabody

Hilary Knight makes a cameo appearance in the film as a street artist.

== Production ==
Filming began in November 2002, and mostly took place in Toronto, Canada. Scenes were also filmed in front of the Plaza Hotel in New York City. The film was shot back-to-back with Eloise at Christmastime.

== Reception ==
Alessandra Stanley from The New York Times praised the film's fidelity to the book and the actors' performances.

Reel Film Reviews gave the film two out of four stars:

Eloise at the Plaza is mildly entertaining, if only because it seems to consist of one caper after another. The film's structure soon becomes perfectly obvious – Eloise gets into a madcap adventure, adults chase her around, Nanny admonishes her, etc – and the fast pace is clearly in place to keep younger viewers interested. But, though there are a number of talented actors in the cast, Eloise just isn't a compelling enough character to sustain an entire movie. There's no doubt that the movie will act as wish fulfillment for kids – who wouldn't want to run amuck and get away with it? – but when you get right down to it, Eloise is awfully thin and one-dimensional (not to mention annoying).

DVDizzy.com wrote:

The film even ascends beyond the second-tier quality that most television movies are satisfied to achieve. Eloise deserves praise not merely as a more bearable Wonderful World of Disney presentation, but as a genuinely entertaining family film, regardless of format.

For his work in Eloise at the Plaza, Bruce Broughton won one Primetime Emmy Award in the category of "Outstanding Music Composition for a Miniseries, Movie or a Special (Dramatic Underscore)".

== Sequel ==
The film's sequel, Eloise at Christmastime, aired on ABC on November 22, 2003.
