= Sofia Vassilieva =

American actress (born 1992)

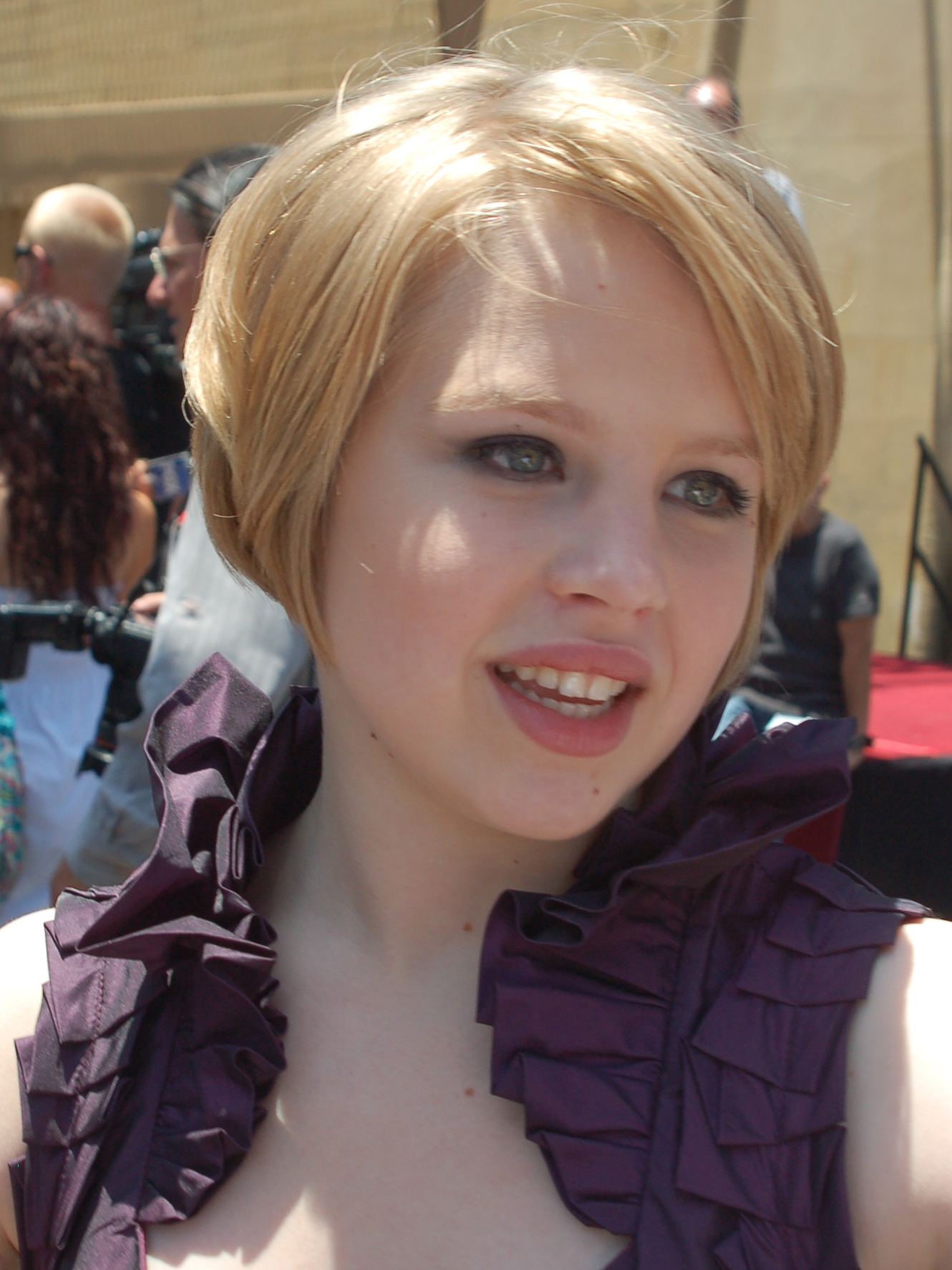
- Vassilieva in June 2009
- Born: Sofia Vladimirovna Vassilieva; October 22, 1992 (age 33); Minneapolis, Minnesota, U.S.
- Other names: Sonya, Sonechka
- Education: Columbia University (BA)
- Occupation: Actress
- Years active: 2000–present
- Known for: Medium; Eloise at the Plaza; Eloise at Christmastime; My Sister's Keeper

Sofia Vladimirovna Vassilieva (born October 22, 1992) is an American actress. Notable roles include portraying the children's book character Eloise in Eloise at the Plaza and Eloise at Christmastime, Ariel DuBois in the TV series Medium, and teenage cancer patient Kate Fitzgerald in the 2009 film adaptation of My Sister's Keeper by Jodi Picoult.

== Early life ==
Vassilieva was born on October 22, 1992, at the Hennepin County Medical Center in Minneapolis, Minnesota, the only child of Russian immigrants. She attended and graduated from Barbizon Modeling and Acting School in Arizona.

== Career ==
At the age of seven, Vassilieva was discovered at the International Modeling and Talent Association (IMTA) in New York, where she won the title of Child Actress and first runner-up Child Model Of The Year 2000.

Less than a year later, Vassilieva received her first role, playing the granddaughter of a retired Russian general in an episode of the CBS television series The Agency.

Vassilieva played Cindy Brady in The Brady Bunch in the White House, opposite Shelley Long and Gary Cole in 2002. That same year, she was cast as a little girl named Gina in Inhabited (2003), starring Malcolm McDowell and Patty McCormack.

In 2003, she played Eloise in two made-for-television movies: Eloise at the Plaza and Eloise at Christmastime, directed by Kevin Lima and featuring Julie Andrews as Nanny. For her role as Eloise, Vassilieva was nominated for the Best Leading Young Actress in a TV Movie, Miniseries or Special at the 2004 Young Artist Awards.

In May 2004, at the age of eleven, Vassilieva was cast as Ariel DuBois in Medium, a series about mother-of-three and consultant to the Phoenix District Attorney's office Allison DuBois (Patricia Arquette), whose psychic visions help solve crimes. The series premiered on January 3, 2005. Vassilieva played the daughter of Arquette's character for seven seasons, until the series' finale on January 21, 2011.

She was a presenter of Family Feature Film on the Humane Society's 19th Genesis Awards in 2005. She won a Young Artist Award in 2006 for Best Supporting Actress in a TV Drama for her role as Ariel DuBois in Medium.

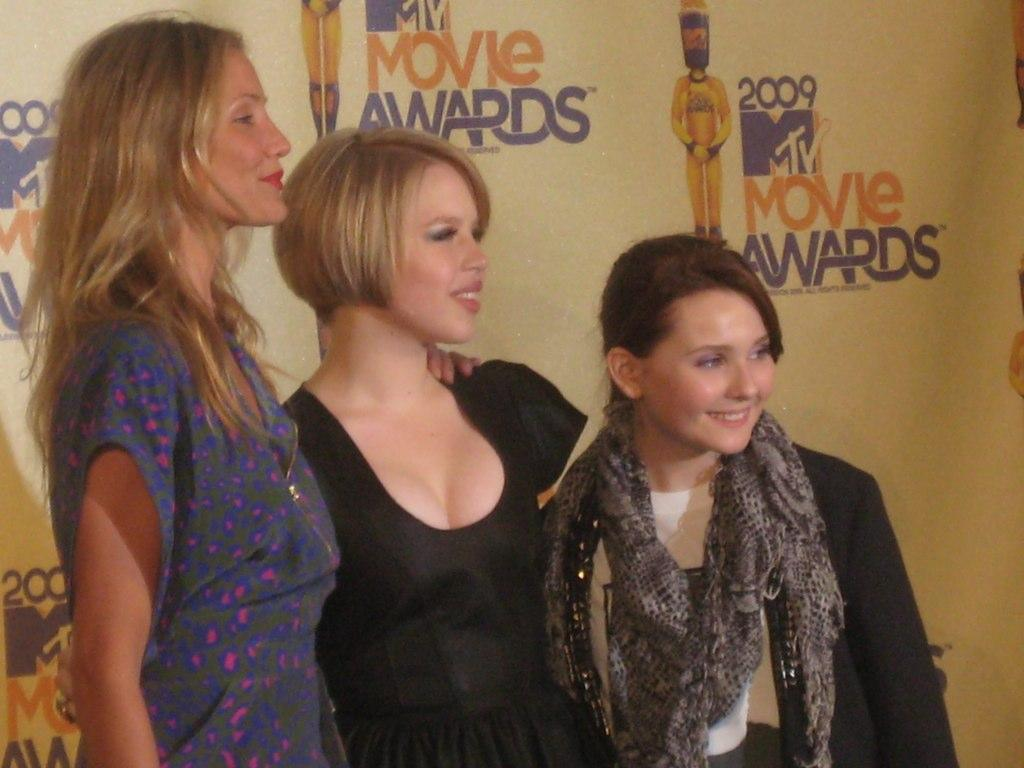
With her My Sister's Keeper co-stars, Cameron Diaz and Abigail Breslin, at 2009 MTV Movie Awards

Vassilieva played a terminally ill teenager, Kate Fitzgerald, in the 2009 adaptation of Jodi Picoult's novel My Sister's Keeper, directed by Nick Cassavetes. She starred alongside Cameron Diaz, Jason Patric, and Abigail Breslin. Vassilieva shaved her head and eyebrows for her role as a teenage cancer patient. In the same year, she became an honorary ambassador for Stand Up to Cancer. For her performance as Kate, Vassilieva won a Young Artist Award for Best Supporting Actress in a Feature Film in 2010. It was her third nomination and second win.

In 2011, she guest-starred on Law & Order: Special Victims Unit in the episode "True Believers" as Sarah Walsh, a piano BFA candidate who is raped in her New York City apartment. She reprised her role as Sarah in the 2013 episode "Wonderland Story".

On May 21, 2014, Vassilieva graduated from Columbia College, Columbia University with a Bachelor of Arts and Science degree, completing a Linguistics major with honors, and a special concentration in Business Management. Vassilieva is a member of Alpha Omicron Pi, an international sorority.

In 2018 and 2021, Vassilieva worked on Black Lightning as Looker.

In 2023, she won the Best Actress in a Feature Film award at the First Glance Film Festival in Los Angeles for her role as Lissa in Lissa's Trip.

== Filmography ==
Film Roles
Year	Film/Show	Role	Notes
2007	Day Zero	Mara	
2009	Hurt	Sarah Parsons	
2009	My Sister's Keeper	Kate Fitzgerald	
2020	Brighton Beach	Dasha	
2021	The Little Things	Tina Salvatore	
2021	13 Minutes	Maddy	
2023	Lissa's Trip	Lissa	
2024	Here's Yianni!	Kali	

Television Roles
Year	Film/Show	Role	Notes
2001	The Agency	Elena	1 episode
2001	The Brady Bunch in the White House	Cindy Brady	TV movie
2003	Eloise at the Plaza	Eloise	TV movie
2003	Eloise at Christmastime	Eloise	TV movie
2003	Inhabited	Gina Russell	Main cast
2005–2011	Medium	Ariel Dubois	Main cast
2011, 2013	Law & Order: Special Victims Unit	Sarah Walsh	2 episodes
2013	Call Me Crazy: A Five Film	Allison	TV movie
2015	Stalker	Dierdre	1 episode
2016	Lucifer	Debra	1 episode
2016	Notorious	Jenna	1 episode
2017	Training Day	Chelsea Brown	1 episode
2017	Criminal Minds: Beyond Borders	Roxy Bental	1 episode
2017	Max	Bess	TV movie
2017-2018	Supergirl	Olivia	2 episodes
2018	Bad Stepmother	Verity	TV movie
2018	Timeless	Abiah Franklin	1 episode
2018	S.W.A.T.	Lauren	1 episode
2018-2021	Black Lightning	Looker	4 episodes
2019	Looking for Alaska	Lara Buterskaya	Limited-run series
2021	All Rise	Olga Kirilenko Petrovic	1 episode
2022	Chicago Fire	Adriana	1 episode
2023	Blue Bloods	Officer Carlie Gillson	1 episode
2025	Duster	Jessica-Lorraine Sims	Recurring
2026	The Rookie	Margaret	1 episode

Video game roles
Year	Title	Role	Notes
2016	Mafia III	Anna McGee	DLC "Sign of the Times"
2017	Call of Duty: WWII	Hazel Daniels	
