= The Old Man and the Sea (1990 film) =

1990 television film directed by Jud Taylor

- VHS cover art
- Based on: The Old Man and the Sea by Ernest Hemingway
- Written by: Roger O. Hirson
- Directed by: Jud Taylor
- Starring: Anthony Quinn; Gary Cole; Patricia Clarkson; Joe Santos
- Composer: Bruce Broughton
- Countries of origin: United States; United Kingdom
- Original language: English

Production
- Executive producer: William F. Storke
- Producer: Robert E. Fuisz
- Production locations: Tortola, British Virgin Islands
- Cinematography: Tony Imi
- Editor: Fredric Steinkamp
- Running time: 93 minutes
- Production company: Yorkshire Television

Original release
- Network: NBC
- Release: March 25, 1990

The Old Man and the Sea is a 1990 American-British adventure drama television film directed by Jud Taylor and written by Roger O. Hirson, based on the 1952 novella of the same name by Ernest Hemingway. The film stars Anthony Quinn, Gary Cole, Patricia Clarkson, and Joe Santos. It received mixed reviews and was nominated for three Primetime Creative Arts Emmy Awards.

== Plot summary ==
There is reason to think Tom Pruitt in the 1990 TV adaptation of The Old Man and the Sea is meant to represent a Hemingway‐type figure, maybe even something like Hemingway himself (or at least a stand‐in). Several sources and critiques suggest that, and the movie adds this character in as sort of a framing device.

== Cast ==
- Anthony Quinn as Santiago
- Gary Cole as Tom Pruitt
- Patricia Clarkson as Mary Pruitt
- Joe Santos as Lopez
- Valentina Quinn as Angela
- Francesco Quinn as Young Santiago
- Paul Calderón as Anderez
- Sully Díaz as Maria
- Manuel Santiago as Gomez
- Alexis Cruz as Manolo

== Release ==
The Old Man and the Sea premiered on NBC on March 25, 1990.

== Awards and nominations ==
Year	Award	Category	Recipient(s)	Result
1990	42nd Primetime Creative Arts Emmy Awards	Outstanding Music Composition for a Miniseries or a Special (Dramatic Underscore)	Bruce Broughton	Nominated
1990	42nd Primetime Creative Arts Emmy Awards	Outstanding Sound Editing for a Miniseries or a Special	Stephen Grubbs; Randal S. Thomas; David Scharf; Gary Gelfand; Joseph A. Johnston; Ken Gladden; Terence Thomas; Andre Caporaso; Phil Jamtaas; Brian Risner; Sam Black; Richard C. Allen	Nominated
1990	42nd Primetime Creative Arts Emmy Awards	Outstanding Sound Mixing for a Miniseries or a Special	Peter Sutton; Thomas J. Huth; Anthony Constantini; Sam Black	Nominated
1990	37th Golden Reel Awards	Best Sound Editing in Television Long Form – Dialogue & ADR	Stephen Grubbs	Won
