= Bruce Broughton =

American composer (born 1945)

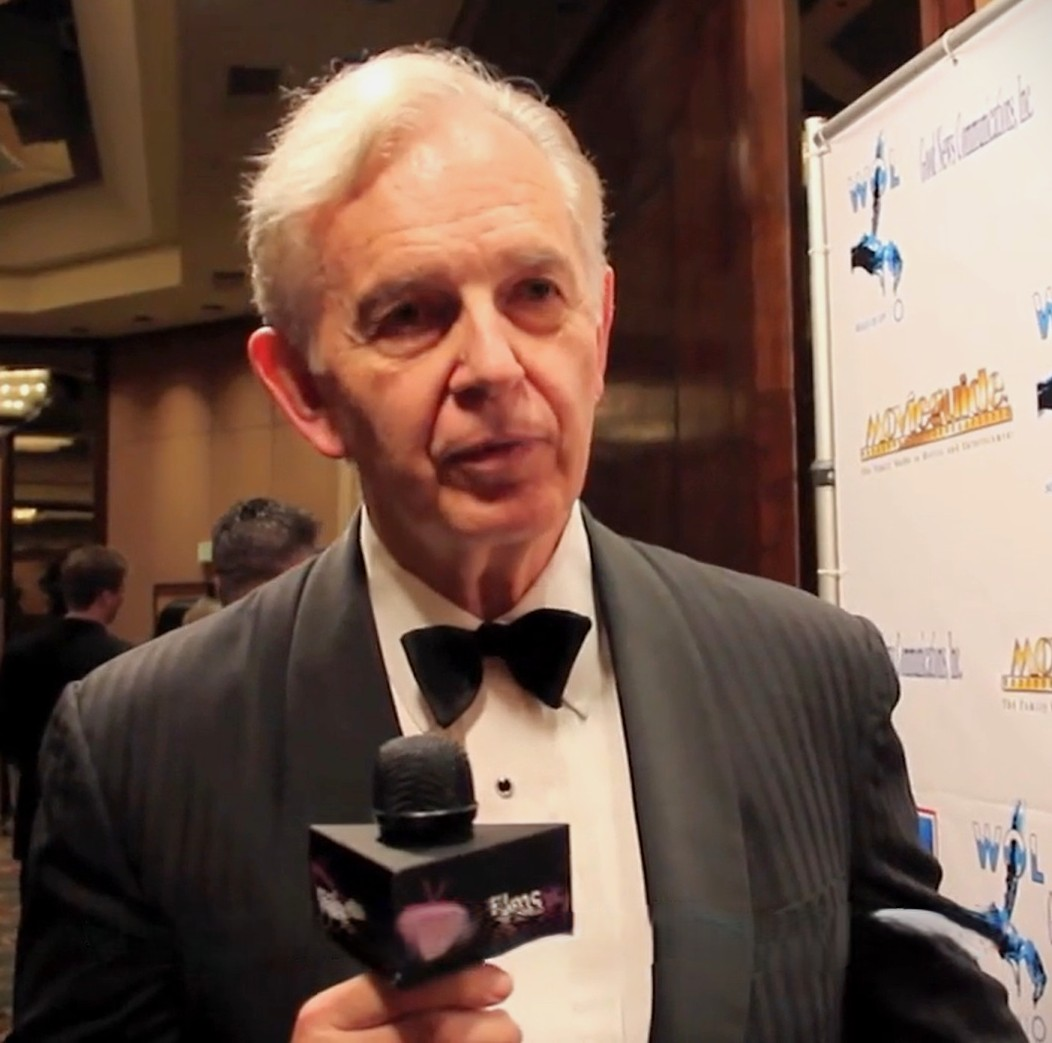
- Broughton in 2014

Background information
- Born: Bruce Harold Broughton; March 8, 1945 (age 81); Los Angeles, California, U.S.
- Occupations: Composer, arranger
- Years active: 1970–present

Bruce Harold Broughton (born March 8, 1945) is an American composer of television, film, and video game scores and concert works. He composed the 1994 version of the 20th Century Fox fanfare. He has won ten Emmy Awards and has been nominated once for the Academy Award for Best Original Score. Broughton is currently a lecturer in composition at University of California, Los Angeles.

== Career ==
Broughton has composed the score for many notable films including Disney films such as The Rescuers Down Under (1990), Homeward Bound: The Incredible Journey (1993) and its sequel, Lost in San Francisco (1996), as well as popular westerns such as Silverado (1985) and Tombstone (1993). Other films scored by Broughton include Young Sherlock Holmes (1985), Baby's Day Out (1994), Harry and the Hendersons (1987), Miracle on 34th Street (1994), and The Boy Who Could Fly (1986). Additionally, he composed music for the video game Heart of Darkness and the animated TV series Tiny Toon Adventures.

Broughton composed music for Disney theme park attractions including Soarin', Spaceship Earth, and Ellen's Energy Adventure.

Silverado earned him an Academy Award nomination, losing to Out of Africa. He has won nearly a dozen Emmy awards.

Broughton is a member of the Board of Directors of ASCAP, a former Governor of both the Academy of Motion Picture Arts and Sciences (AMPAS) and the Academy of Television Arts & Sciences, a Past President of the Society of Composers & Lyricists, and a lecturer at UCLA and USC.

In 2019, he donated his collection of 614 orchestral scores and sets of parts to the library of the University of North Texas College of Music.

=== Academy Awards controversy ===
Broughton's song "Alone yet Not Alone", from the film with the same name, was originally nominated for an Academy Award for Best Original Song at the 86th Academy Awards. But on January 29, 2014, the nomination was revoked after the Motion Picture Academy discovered that Broughton, a former Academy governor who, at the time, was an executive committee member of the Academy's music branch, had improperly contacted other branch members.

"No matter how well-intentioned the communication, using one's position as a former governor and current executive committee member to personally promote one's own Oscar submission creates the appearance of an unfair advantage", Cheryl Boone Isaacs, the Academy's president, said in a statement. Not everyone agreed with the Academy's actions, pointing out that it is a normal part of the period before nominations that people involved in all aspects of a film will promote their work with a "for your consideration" letter to the extensive list of voting members of the Academy.

== Filmography ==
=== Television ===
Year	Title	Notes
1973-1975	Gunsmoke	5 episodes
1973-1979	Hawaii Five-O	18 episodes Nominated - Primetime Emmy Award for Best Music Composition - For a Series, a Single Program of a Series
1977	The Oregon Trail	4 episodes
1977-1983	Quincy, M.E.	64 episodes
1978-1979	Barnaby Jones	2 episodes
1978-1979	How the West Was Won	11 episodes
1979	The Paradise Connection	Television film
1979-1985	Dallas	52 episodes Won - Primetime Emmy Award for Outstanding Music Composition for a Series (Dramatic Underscore)
1980	The Return of Frank Cannon	Television film
1980	Desperate Voyage	Television film
1981	The Girl, the Gold Watch & Dynamite	Television film
1981	Buck Rogers in the 25th Century	5 episodes Won - Primetime Emmy Award for Outstanding Music Composition for a Series (Dramatic Underscore)
1981	Killjoy	Television film Nominated - Primetime Emmy Award for Outstanding Music Composition for a Limited Series or a Special (Dramatic Underscore)
1982	Desperate Lives	Television film
1982	The Blue and the Gray	Miniseries; Nominated - Primetime Emmy Award for Outstanding Music Composition for a Miniseries or a Special (Dramatic Underscore)
1982	One Shoe Makes It Murder	Television film
1983	M.A.D.D.: Mothers Against Drunk Drivers	Television film
1983	Cowboy	Television film
1983	This Girl for Hire	Television film
1984	The Master of Ballantrae	Television film
1984	Passions	Television film
1984	The Cowboy and the Ballerina	Television film
1984	The First Olympics: Athens 1896	Miniseries Won - Primetime Emmy Award for Outstanding Music Composition for a Limited Series or a Special (Dramatic Underscore)
1985	Stormin' Home	
1986	George Washington II: The Forging of a Nation	
1985-1986	Amazing Stories	4 episodes
1989	Sorry, Wrong Number	Television film
1990	The Old Man and the Sea	Nominated - Primetime Emmy Award for Outstanding Music Composition for a Miniseries or a Special (Dramatic Underscore)
1990-1992	Tiny Toon Adventures	11 episodes Won - Daytime Emmy Award for Best Original Song
1991	Dinosaurs	5 episodes
1992	O Pioneers!	Television film Won - Primetime Emmy Award for Outstanding Music Composition for a Miniseries or a Special (Dramatic Underscore)
1992	‘’Capitol Critters‘’	
1995	JAG	2 episodes Nominated - Primetime Emmy Award for Outstanding Main Title Theme Music
1997	True Women	Miniseries
1998	Glory & Honor Won - Primetime Emmy Award for Outstanding Music Composition for a Miniseries or a Movie (Dramatic Underscore)	Television film
1998	Jeremiah	Television film
1999	Night Ride Home	Television film
2001	The Ballad of Lucy Whipple	Television film
2002	Roughing It	Television film
2002	Damaged Care	Television film
2002	First Monday	2 episodes
2002	Bobbie's Girl	Television film
2002	The Locket	Television film
2003	Eloise at the Plaza	Television film Won - Primetime Emmy Award for Outstanding Music Composition for a Miniseries, Movie or a Special (Dramatic Underscore)
2003	The Wonderful World of Disney	2 episodes
2003	Lucy	Television film
2003	Eloise at Christmastime	Television film Won - Primetime Emmy Award for Outstanding Music Composition for a Miniseries, Movie or a Special (Dramatic Underscore)
2005	Warm Springs	Television film Won - Primetime Emmy Award for Outstanding Music Composition for a Miniseries, Movie or a Special (Dramatic Underscore)
2005	The Dive from Clausen's Pier	Television film
2009	Safe Harbor	Television film
2015	Texas Rising	Miniseries; with John Debney Nominated - Primetime Emmy Award for Outstanding Main Title Theme Music
2017	The Orville	Main title theme and "Old Wounds" score with Joel McNeely, John Debney, and Andrew Cottee
2023	Tiny Toons Looniversity	Original theme music, with new lyrics by Erin Gibson and theme music produced by Matthew Janszen
2026	The Gray House	Miniseries; with John Debney

=== Film ===
Year	Title	Director	Studio	Notes
1983	The Prodigal	James F. Collier	Worldwide Entertainment	
1984	The Ice Pirates	Stewart Raffill	Metro-Goldwyn-Mayer; United Artists	
1985	Silverado	Lawrence Kasdan	Columbia Pictures	Nominated - Academy Award for Best Original Score
1985	Young Sherlock Holmes	Barry Levinson	Amblin Entertainment; Paramount Pictures	Won - Saturn Award for Best Music
1986	Sweet Liberty	Alan Alda	Universal Pictures	
1986	The Boy Who Could Fly	Nick Castle	Lorimar Motion Pictures; 20th Century Fox	
1987	Square Dance	Daniel Petrie; Michael Nesmith	Island Pictures; NBC Productions	
1987	Harry and the Hendersons	William Dear	Amblin Entertainment; Universal Pictures	
1987	The Monster Squad	Fred Dekker	HBO Pictures; TriStar Pictures	Nominated - Saturn Award for Best Music
1987	Big Shots	Robert Mandel	Lorimar Motion Pictures; 20th Century Fox	
1987	Cross My Heart	Armyan Bernstein	Universal Pictures	
1988	The Presidio	Peter Hyams	Paramount Pictures	
1988	The Rescue	Ferdinand Fairfax	Touchstone Pictures	
1988	Moonwalker	Jerry Kramer; Will Vinton; Jim Blashfield Colin Chilvers	MJJ Productions; Lorimar Motion Pictures; Warner Bros.	Underscore for the "Speed Demon" and "Smooth Criminal" segments
1988	Last Rites	Donald P. Bellisario	Metro-Goldwyn-Mayer	
1989	Jacknife	David Jones	Kings Road Entertainment; Cineplex Odeon Films	
1990	Betsy's Wedding	Alan Alda	Touchstone Pictures	
1990	Narrow Margin	Peter Hyams	Carolco Pictures; TriStar Pictures (US); Universal Pictures (International)	
1990	The Rescuers Down Under	Hendel Butoy; Mike Gabriel	Walt Disney Pictures; Walt Disney Feature Animation	Broughton's first score for animated film
1991	All I Want for Christmas	Robert Lieberman	Paramount Pictures	
1992	Honey, I Blew Up the Kid	Randal Kleiser	Walt Disney Pictures	
1992	Tiny Toon Adventures: How I Spent My Vacation	Rich Arons Ken Boyer Kent Butterworth Barry Caldwell Alfred Gimeno Art Leonardi Byron Vaughns		
Stay Tuned	Peter Hyams	Morgan Creek Productions; Warner Bros.		
1993	Homeward Bound: The Incredible Journey	Duwayne Dunham	Walt Disney Pictures	
1993	So I Married an Axe Murderer	Thomas Schlamme	TriStar Pictures	
1993	For Love or Money	Barry Sonnenfeld	Imagine Entertainment; Universal Pictures	
1993	Tombstone	George P. Cosmatos	Cinergi Pictures; Hollywood Pictures (US); Entertainment Film Distributors (UK)	
1994	Holy Matrimony	Leonard Nimoy	Interscope Communications; PolyGram Filmed Entertainment; Hollywood Pictures	
1994	Baby's Day Out	Patrick Read Johnson	20th Century Fox	
1994	Miracle on 34th Street	Les Mayfield	20th Century Fox	
1996	Carried Away	Bruno Barreto	CineTel Films; Fine Line Features	
1996	Homeward Bound II: Lost in San Francisco	David R. Ellis	Walt Disney Pictures	
1996	House Arrest	Harry Winer	Rysher Entertainment; Metro-Goldwyn-Mayer	
1996	Infinity	Matthew Broderick	First Look Pictures	
1997	Shadow Conspiracy	George P. Cosmatos	Cinergi Pictures; Hollywood Pictures	
1997	A Simple Wish	Michael Ritchie	The Bubble Factory; Universal Pictures	
1998	Krippendorf's Tribe	Todd Holland	Touchstone Pictures	
1998	Lost in Space	Stephen Hopkins	Jim Henson's Creature Shop; New Line Cinema	
1998	One Tough Cop	Bruno Barreto	Stratosphere Entertainment	
2004	Last Flight Out	Jerry Jameson	Worldwide Entertainment River Stone Productions	Direct-to-video
2004	Mickey, Donald, Goofy: The Three Musketeers	Donovan Cook	Disneytoon Studios; Walt Disney Pictures	Direct-to-video
2006	Bambi II	Brian Pimental	Disneytoon Studios; Walt Disney Pictures	Direct-to-video
2011	The Pledge	J.W. Myers	Phase 4 Films	Direct-to-video
2013	A Christmas Tree Miracle	J.W. Myers	Route 40 Films Flyover Films	Direct-to-video
2017	Shot	Jeremy Kagan	Paladin	

== Concert work ==
=== Orchestral ===
Year	Title	Publisher
	A Tiny Symphony for Strings	Black Squirrel Music
	American Hero for Orchestra	Black Squirrel Music
	Concerto for Piccolo and Chamber Orchestra	Meridian Publishing LLC
	Concerto for Tuba and Orchestra	Edwin F. Kalmus & Co.
	English Music for Horn and Strings	Chester Music and Novello & Co.
	Fanfares: Mosaic for Orchestra	Brubel Music
	Four Kinds of Walking: Suite for Strings	Brubel Music
	Mixed Elements for Orchestra	Brubel Music
	Saloon Music for B♭ Cornet and Pit Orchestra	Brubel Music
	Silverado for Orchestra	EMI Golden Torch Music Corp.
	The Magic Horn For Orchestra and Narrator	Shardice
	Triptych for Violin and Chamber Orchestra	Shardice

=== Chamber music ===
Year	Title	Publisher
	Blowhard for Horn and Piano	Brubel Music
	Sonata for Horn and Piano	Ballad for Trombone and Piano
	Sonata (Concerto) for Tuba and Piano	Edwin F. Kalmus & Co.
	Chambers for Solo Trumpet	Curnow Music
	In Memoriam for Solo Trumpet	Brubel Music
	Turbulance for Tuba and Piano	Brubel Music
	Oliver's Birthday for Trumpet and Piano	Black Squirrel Music
	Tent Meeting Revival with Hallelujah Wind-up for Euphonium and Piano	Brubel Music
	Remembrance for alto Saxophone and Piano	Black Squirrel Music
	Medium, Big, and Small Duos for Alto flute, Piccolo, and Piano	Brubel Music
	Bounce for Bassoon, Double String Quartet and Bass	Brubel Music
	Variations for Flute and Piano	Black Squirrel Music
	Gold Rush Songs	Brubel Music
	Concerto for Violoncello and 10 Instruments	Brubel Music
	Short Stories for Marimba and Piano	C. Alan Publications
	Five Pieces for Piano	Brubel Music
	Three	Eighth Note Publications
	Bipartition	Shardice
	There is Always Something to Do (For Morelle)	Fatrock Ink
	Timeline (1945 - )	Brubel Music
	Tyvek Wood	Fatrock Ink
	The Fingerprints of Childhood	Brubel Music
	Bi	Brubel Music
	NeBRASSka	Brubel Music
	Conversations	Brubel Music
	Three American Porraits	Black Squirrel Music
	when a body meets a body	Brubel Music
	Hornworks for Five Horns and Tuba	Brubel Music
	Concert Piece for Eight Trumpets	Black Squirrel Music
	Euphonies	Black Squirrel Music
	Hudson River Valley	Brubel Music
	Fanfare for 16 Horns	Brubel Music

=== Symphonic Band / Wind Ensemble ===
Year	Title	Publisher
	A Frontier Overture for Brass Band	Winwood Music
	American Hero for Symphonic Band	Black Squirrel Music
	California Legend for Brass Band	Winwood Music
	Celebration for Symphonic Winds	Brubel Music
	Concerto for Piccolo and Wind Ensemble	Randol Music
	Concerto (Sonata) for Tuba and Winds	Edwin F. Kalmus & Co.
	Excursions for Trumpet and Band	Black Squirrel Music
	Fanfares, Marches, Hymns & Finale	Masters Music
	Harlequin	Winwood Music
	In the World of Spirits	Brubel Music
	Masters of Space and Time	Chester Music and Novello & Co.
	New Era	Ludwig Music Publishing Co.
2018	Quaternity for Trombone and Symphonic Winds	Brubel Music

== Awards ==
- Emmy Award wins:
  - Warm Springs: Outstanding Music Composition for a Miniseries, Movie or a Special (Dramatic Underscore), 2005
  - Eloise at Christmastime: Outstanding Music Composition for a Miniseries, Movie or a Special (Dramatic Underscore), 2004
  - Eloise at the Plaza: Outstanding Music Composition for a Miniseries, Movie or a Special (Dramatic Underscore), 2003
  - Glory & Honor: Outstanding Music Composition for a Miniseries, Movie or a Special (Dramatic Underscore), 1998
  - O Pioneers!: Outstanding Music Composition for a Miniseries, Movie or a Special (Dramatic Underscore), 1992
  - Tiny Toon Adventures: Outstanding Original Song for main title theme (shared with lyricists Wayne Kaatz and Tom Ruegger), 1991
  - The First Olympics: Athens 1896: Part 1, Outstanding Music Composition for a Limited Series or a Special (Dramatic Underscore), 1984
  - Dallas: Outstanding Music Composition for a Series (Dramatic Underscore) for episode "The Letter", 1984
  - Dallas: Outstanding Music Composition for a Series (Dramatic Underscore) for episode "The Ewing Blues", 1983
  - Buck Rogers in the 25th Century: Outstanding Music Composition for a Series (Dramatic Underscore) for episode "The Satyr", 1981
- Emmy Award nominations:
  - The Dive from Clausen's Pier: Outstanding Music Composition for a Miniseries, Movie or a Special (Dramatic Underscore), 2006
  - First Monday: Outstanding Main Title Theme Music, 2002
  - True Women: Outstanding Music Composition for a Miniseries or a Special (Dramatic Underscore), 1997
  - JAG: Outstanding Main Title Theme Music, 1995
  - The Old Man and the Sea: Outstanding Music Composition for a Miniseries or a Special (Dramatic Underscore), 1990
  - Two Marriages: Outstanding Music and Lyrics for the song "Home Here" (shared with lyricist Dory Previn), 1984
  - The Blue and the Gray: Part 2: Outstanding Music Composition for a Limited Series or a Special (Dramatic Underscore), 1983
  - Quincy, M.E.: Outstanding Music and Lyrics for the song "Quincy's Wedding Song" from the episode "Quincy's Wedding", part 2 (shared with lyricist Mark Mueller), 1983
  - Killjoy: Outstanding Music Composition for a Limited Series or a Special (Dramatic Underscore), 1982
  - Dallas: Outstanding Music Composition for a Series (Dramatic Underscore) for the episode "The Search," 1982
  - Dallas: Outstanding Music Composition for a Series (Dramatic Underscore) for the episode "The Lost Child," 1980
  - Hawaii Five-O, Outstanding Music Composition for a Series (Dramatic Underscore) for the episode "The $100,000 Nickel," 1974
- Academy Award nominations
  - Silverado, Best Original Score (1986)
- Grammy Award nomination
  - Young Sherlock Holmes, Best Instrumental Composition
- Saturn Award
  - Young Sherlock Holmes: Best Music, 1985
