= Eloise at Christmastime =

2003 American TV movie

- DVD cover
- Genre: Comedy
- Based on: Eloise by Kay Thompson
- Written by: Elizabeth Chandler
- Directed by: Kevin Lima
- Starring: Julie Andrews; Sofia Vassilieva; Kenneth Welsh; Debra Monk; Gavin Creel; Christine Baranski; Jeffrey Tambor
- Music by: Bruce Broughton
- Country of origin: United States
- Original language: English

Production
- Executive producers: Denise Di Novi; Patrick Meehan
- Producers: Christine Sacani; Thomas D. Adelman
- Cinematography: James Chressanthis
- Editor: Gregory Perler
- Running time: 89 minutes
- Production companies: HandMade Films; Di Novi Pictures; Disney Branded Television

Original release
- Network: ABC
- Release: November 22, 2003

Related
- Eloise at the Plaza

Eloise at Christmastime is a 2003 American Christmas comedy television film based on the 1958 book written by Kay Thompson and illustrated by Hilary Knight. The film stars Sofia Vassilieva as Eloise, a six-year-old girl who lives in the penthouse at the top of the Plaza Hotel in New York City. Julie Andrews, Kenneth Welsh, Debra Monk, Gavin Creel, Christine Baranski, and Jeffrey Tambor also star. It is a sequel to Eloise at the Plaza and the story takes place immediately after the events of that film.

The film was directed by Kevin Lima, written by Elizabeth Chandler, produced by HandMade Films and Di Novi Pictures for Walt Disney Television, and filmed in Toronto and New York City back-to-back with the first film. It aired on ABC on November 22, 2003, as an episode of The Wonderful World of Disney. It was released on both VHS and DVD by Buena Vista Home Entertainment. Since 2009, the film has been part of the 25 Days of Christmas programming block on Freeform (formerly ABC Family), but it was not part of the block in 2010. From 2011 to 2013, it aired on the Hallmark Channel as part of the channel's "Countdown to Christmas".

== Plot ==
The Plaza Hotel is getting ready for the Christmas holiday season. Eloise is on a mission to find presents in the package room from her mother, who has taken a trip to Paris. When Eloise does not find any packages, she leaves the room in a large mess. She skips towards the lobby, pushes into a long line at the check-in desk and interrupts a conversation between hotel manager Mr. Salamone and two patrons who want to upgrade their current suite to a parkside view room.

Eloise asks Mr. Salamone if there have been any packages from her mother in Paris, and he replies there have not. He pushes her away, telling Eloise he is very busy. Eloise cuts into the line again, offering Mr. Salamone some unnecessary help. Mr. Salamone declines and pushes Eloise away from the hectic line.

Eloise leaves, but returns abruptly when she notices a suspicious man waiting in the queue. She thinks this patron is a spy, but Mr. Salamone disagrees and instantly changes the subject so Eloise can leave the line. He asks her to watch for the hotel's Christmas tree delivery, which is due to happen any moment, and tells her to inform him when this happens. Eloise leaves the line, and tells the "spy" she is keeping her eye on him.

Rachel Peabody, daughter of Mr. Peabody (manager of the Plaza), returns from college with her fiancé, Brooks Oliver III. Eloise eventually learns Brooks doesn't love Rachel and is trying to marry her to gain access to her money. She also discovers Rachel was in a romantic relationship with Bill, a room service waiter and a friend of Eloise's, four years earlier. When Mr. Peabody learned of his daughter's relationship with Bill, he sent her to an overseas university, hoping to break them up. Eloise intervenes with the relationship in order to get Bill and Rachel back together.

After Eloise's frequent attempts to get Bill and Rachel to spend more time together, Rachel calls off her wedding at the last minute; Bill enters the room and the two reunite. Brooks is arrested for forgery, and Mrs. Thornton, who was in danger of being evicted, is granted a permanent stay at the Plaza. Eloise's mother arrives and they rejoice.

== Cast ==
- Julie Andrews as Nanny
- Sofia Vassilieva as Eloise
- Kenneth Welsh as Sir Wilkes
- Debra Monk as Maggie
- Gavin Creel as Bill
- Rick Roberts as Brooks Oliver
- Sara Topham as Rachel Peabody
- Corinne Conley as Mrs. Thornton
- Christine Baranski as Prunella Stickler
- Jeffrey Tambor as Mr. Salomone
- Araxi Arslanian as Head of Housekeeping
- Tannis Burnett as Miss Thompson
- Neil Crone as Agent Kringle
- Arlene Duncan as Lily
- Sean Gallagher as Rick
- Graham Harley as Walter
- Colm Magner as Thomas the Maitre'd
- Debra McGrath as Cornelia
- Julian Richings as Patrice
- Cliff Saunders as Max
- Tony Sciara as Assistant Chef Marco
- David Sparrow as Charlie, the 59th Street Doorman
- Victor A. Young as Mr. Peabody

== Production ==
Filming took place mostly in Toronto, Canada. Scenes were also filmed in front of the Plaza Hotel in New York City. The film was shot back-to-back with Eloise at the Plaza.
