= O Pioneers! (film) =

- VHS cover
- Genre: Drama
- Based on: O Pioneers! by Willa Cather
- Teleplay by: Robert W. Lenski
- Directed by: Glenn Jordan
- Starring: Jessica Lange; David Strathairn; Tom Aldredge
- Music by: Bruce Broughton
- Country of origin: United States
- Original language: English

Production
- Executive producer: Craig Anderson
- Producer: Glenn Jordan
- Cinematography: Dick Bush
- Editor: Scott Conrad
- Running time: 99 minutes
- Production companies: Prairie Films; Craig Anderson Productions; Lorimar Television; Hallmark Hall of Fame Productions

Original release
- Network: CBS
- Release: February 2, 1992

O Pioneers! is a 1992 American drama television film produced and directed by Glenn Jordan and written by Robert W. Lenski, based on the 1913 novel of the same title by Willa Cather. It originally aired as a Hallmark Hall of Fame presentation on February 2, 1992 on CBS, and stars Jessica Lange. It was also the film debut for Anne Heche, who had a small supporting role in the film.

== Plot summary ==
The film centers around a family of Swedish immigrants in Nebraska around the turn of the 20th century. The family's father dies and leaves the family farm to his daughter. She does her best to make the farm work when many others are giving up and leaving.
Marie Shabata (czech Šabata) is Emil’s childhood friend and the object of his love. She comes from a Bohemian family and is beautiful, She runs off and marries Frank Shabata when she’s just eighteen, but comes to believe that she was not the right person for Frank. She comes to return Emil’s love, and though she tries (and fails) to resist her feelings.

== Cast ==
- Jessica Lange as Alexandra Bergson
- David Strathairn as Carl Linstrum
- Tom Aldredge as Ivar
- Reed Diamond as Emil
- Josh Hamilton as Young Carl Linstrum
- Heather Graham as Young Alexandra Bergson
- Anne Heche as Marie

== Filming locations ==
Much of the filming was done on location in and around Johnstown, in northern Nebraska. Many of the buildings used are still in use today and retain the board sidewalks seen in sections of the film. Additional scenes were filmed in Clarkson, Nebraska, in the northeast part of the state, at what was then the city's library, as well as a small farmhouse north of town.

== Reception ==
It first aired on television on February 2, 1992, and was the second-most watched primetime show of the week.

== Awards and nominations ==
Awards

- 1992 Emmy Award - Outstanding Music Composition for a Miniseries or a Special (Dramatic Underscore)
- 1993 Western Heritage Award - Television Feature Film

Nominations

- 1992 Emmy Award - Outstanding Hairstyling for a Miniseries or a Special
- 1993 Golden Globe award - Best Performance by an Actress in a Miniseries or Motion Picture Made for Television (Jessica Lange).
