= The Little Things (2021 film) =

Film by John Lee Hancock

- Theatrical release poster
- Directed by: John Lee Hancock
- Written by: John Lee Hancock
- Produced by: Mark Johnson; John Lee Hancock
- Starring: Denzel Washington; Rami Malek; Jared Leto; Natalie Morales
- Cinematography: John Schwartzman
- Edited by: Robert Frazen
- Music by: Thomas Newman
- Production company: Gran Via Productions
- Distributed by: Warner Bros. Pictures
- Release date: January 29, 2021 (United States)
- Running time: 128 minutes
- Country: United States
- Language: English
- Budget: $30 million
- Box office: $30.8 million

The Little Things is a 2021 American neo-noir psychological crime thriller film directed, written, and co-produced by John Lee Hancock and co-produced by Mark Johnson. Set in early 1990s Los Angeles, the film follows two detectives (Denzel Washington and Rami Malek) who investigate a string of murders, which lead them to a strange loner who may be the culprit (Jared Leto).

The film initially began development in 1993, when Hancock wrote the original draft of the screenplay, with various names attached to direct or act, but it languished in development hell. The project was revitalized in 2019, with announcements that Hancock would direct, with Malek, Leto and Washington to portray the main characters. Principal photography began in Los Angeles on September 2, 2019, and wrapped in December 2019.

The Little Things was released in the United States on January 29, 2021, by Warner Bros. Pictures, both theatrically and, for one month, simultaneously on the HBO Max streaming service. The film received mixed reviews from critics, with praise for the cast but criticism of the screenplay, and grossed $30.8 million worldwide against its $30 million production budget. For his performance, Leto received Golden Globe and SAG nominations for Best Supporting Actor.

== Plot ==
One night in 1990, a teenaged girl drives on a deserted highway, stalked by a motorist. She pulls into a gas station, which is closed. A pursuit on foot begins. She manages to catch the attention of a passing truck driver and escapes her stalker.

Some time later in Bakersfield, Kern County Deputy Sheriff Joe "Deke" Deacon is sent to the Los Angeles County Sheriff's Department to collect evidence pertaining to a recent murder. A former LASD detective, Deacon accompanies lead detective Jimmy Baxter to the scene of a murder in L.A. Deacon notices similarities between the killing and an old serial murder case he was unable to solve.

That night, a woman named Ronda Rathbun is followed by a car while jogging and is reported missing the following morning. Baxter learns from Captain Farris that Deacon had gotten divorced and suffered a heart attack due to his obsession with the unsolved case. Baxter is advised not to involve him any further. Deacon takes vacation leave from his station to assist in solving Baxter's case.

The next night, the police discover the body of another victim washed up beneath a bridge. Baxter learns the murder is consistent with the earlier murder and others: the victims were all prostitutes who were stabbed to death. Deacon begins investigating Albert Sparma, a suspect working at a repair shop in proximity to the murders. He tails him but is thwarted, and he takes him in for questioning. While under interrogation, Sparma taunts the detectives and is released after provoking Deacon into an angry outburst. The young woman pursued in the desert is interviewed but has seen Sparma in handcuffs at the police station, which compromises her eligibility as an objective witness to identify him as a suspect.

The FBI will take charge of the investigation within the week, giving Deacon and Baxter less time to resolve it. Farris informs Baxter that eight years prior, Sparma confessed to a murder which he could not possibly have committed and is thus an unlikely suspect. Baxter and Deacon nonetheless continue investigating. Sparma's fingerprint is similar to the killer's but not a definitive match. Their next move is an illegal search at Sparma's apartment. With Baxter standing guard outside, Deacon unsuccessfully searches the apartment for incriminating evidence, only finding newspaper clippings related to the cases. Sparma's police scanner goes off and Deacon hears an "officer down" alert for the address. As police converge on the building, Deacon escapes over the roof, with Sparma watching his ordeal and casually waving his hand at Baxter.

While surveiling Sparma, Baxter corners him and demands to know Rathbun's location. Sparma offers to drive him to where he supposedly hid Rathbun's body. Baxter cautiously agrees while Deacon secretly follows. Sparma takes Baxter to a remote area in the desert and has him dig several holes before telling him that he never killed anyone. Skeptical, he continues digging. Sparma begins to taunt him until Baxter snaps and strikes him in the face with the shovel, killing him.

As Deacon arrives, a flashback reveals that he accidentally shot the one survivor of his last murder case and that Farris and Dunigan, the coroner, helped cover it up. Deacon instructs Baxter to bury Sparma in the desert, while he spends the night collecting everything in Sparma's apartment and disposing of his vehicle. Then he returns to the desert the following morning to find that Baxter has not buried Sparma but is instead still searching for the victim, desperate to believe he is the killer. Deacon (whose waking dreams are haunted by the earlier victims) advises Baxter to forget about the case or it will haunt him for life.

Later, at his home, Baxter receives an envelope sent by Deacon, containing a red barrette like the one Ronda Rathbun was wearing when she was abducted. Back in Kern County, Deacon burns everything he collected in the apartment, along with a brand new pack of barrettes that is similar to the missing red one.

== Cast ==
- Denzel Washington as Joe "Deke" Deacon of the KCSO
- Rami Malek as James "Jimmy" Baxter of the LASD
- Jared Leto as Albert Sparma
- Chris Bauer as Detective Sal Rizoli
- Michael Hyatt as Flo Dunigan
- Terry Kinney as LASD Captain Carl Farris
- Natalie Morales as Detective Jamie Estrada
- Isabel Arraiza as Ana Baxter
- Joris Jarsky as Detective Sergeant Rogers
- Glenn Morshower as KCSO Captain Henry Davis

In addition, the victims are portrayed by Sofia Vassilieva as the narrowly escaping Tina Salvatore, and Maya Kazan as Ronda Rathbun, while the earlier victims – seen in photos and haunting the waking dreams of Deacon – are Anna McKitrick as Mary Roberts (whom Deacon had accidentally shot), Sheila Houlahan as Paige Callahan, and Ebony N. Mayo as Tamara Ewing.

== Production ==
The first draft was written by Hancock in 1993 for Steven Spielberg to direct, but Spielberg passed because he felt the story was too dark. Clint Eastwood, Warren Beatty, and Danny DeVito were all separately attached before Hancock decided to direct it himself. Hancock said actor Brandon Lee, who died that year, wanted a role in the film after reading the script. Lee can be seen on the TV series Ohara playing in Sparma's apartment.

In March 2019, Denzel Washington signed on to star in the film. In May, Rami Malek joined the cast. In August, Jared Leto entered into talks for the role of the suspected serial killer, Albert Sparma. Natalie Morales, Joris Jarsky, Sheila Houlahan and Sofia Vassilieva were cast in September, with Michael Hyatt, Kerry O'Malley, Jason James Richter, Isabel Arraiza and John Harlan Kim joining the cast of the film in October. In November, Chris Bauer was also added.

Principal photography began on September 2, 2019, in Los Angeles, California. Filming wrapped in December 2019.

=== Music ===
The Little Things (Original Motion Picture Soundtrack)

Film score by Thomas Newman
- Released: January 29, 2021
- Genre: Film score
- Length: 55:20
- Label: WaterTower Music

Thomas Newman film scores chronology
Let Them All Talk (2020)	The Little Things (Original Motion Picture Soundtrack) (2021)	Operation Mincemeat (2021)

All music is composed by Thomas Newman

Track listing
No.	Title	Length
1.	"Chevy Nova"	2:59
2.	"Musica Latina"	1:55
3.	"Motion to Dismiss"	1:15
4.	"Meat Wagon"	1:05
5.	"Second Story Walkup"	1:45
6.	"Gentlemen's Club"	1:22
7.	"Hollywood Cross"	1:23
8.	"Shirley Temple to Go"	4:47
9.	"Buck Twenty"	2:20
10.	"Vacation Days"	1:21
11.	"St Agnes"	2:28
12.	"Wing Mirror"	0:43
13.	"Jack Aboud"	1:29
14.	"La Loma Bridge"	2:07
15.	"Reverend Captain"	0:47
16.	"Mosman's"	1:29
17.	"New Disciple"	1:07
18.	"I Won't Bite"	4:46
19.	"Padlock"	0:50
20.	"Get Up"	1:39
21.	"Strong Box"	3:47
22.	"End of the World"	2:40
23.	"Red Barrette"	2:32
24.	"A Dead Girl Wakes"	4:59
25.	"Little Things"	3:45
Total length:		55:20

== Release ==
The film was theatrically released in the United States on January 29, 2021, by Warner Bros. Pictures. It also had a simultaneous release on the HBO Max streaming service for 31 days, as part of Warner Bros.' plan for all of its 2021 films. It was the most-watched item on the platform in its debut weekend, with Samba TV reporting that 1.4 million households streamed the film over its opening weekend. By the end of its first month, the film had been watched in over 3 million U.S. households.

The film was released on Premium VOD on March 19, 2021. It was released by Warner Bros. Home Entertainment on digital on April 20, 2021. The film received a Blu-ray and DVD release on May 4, 2021, in the United States. The film was re-added to HBO Max on June 17, 2021.

== Reception ==
=== Box office ===
The Little Things grossed $15.3 million in the United States and Canada, and $15.5 million in other territories, for a worldwide total of $30.8 million.

The film was released on the same day as the limited release of Nomadland and was projected to gross around $2.5 million in its opening weekend. It ended up debuting to $4.8 million from 2,171 theaters, topping the box office; 55% of the audience was male, while 80% were over the age of 25. Internationally, the film grossed $2.8 million from 18 markets for a worldwide start of $7.6 million. The film remained atop the box office both domestically and abroad in its second weekend, with $2.1 million and $1.4 million, respectively. The film made $2.4 million over its third weekend, the four-day President's Day slate, and was dethroned by holdover The Croods: A New Age, then made $1.2 million in its fourth weekend.

=== Critical response ===
On review aggregator Rotten Tomatoes, 44% of 266 critics gave the film a positive review with an average rating of 5.4/10. The website's critics consensus reads, "An exceptionally well-cast throwback thriller, The Little Things will feel deeply familiar to genre fans -- for better and for worse." On Metacritic, it holds a weighted average score of 54 out of 100 based on 48 critics, indicating "mixed or average" reviews. Audiences polled by CinemaScore gave the film an average grade of "B−" on an A+ to F scale, and PostTrak reported 67% of filmgoers gave the film a positive score, with 40% saying they would definitely recommend it.

David Ehrlich of IndieWire gave the film a grade of B and compared it to Seven, writing, "The Little Things is pulpy and ridiculous and requires some major suspension of disbelief, but — if you didn't know any better — you might even say it's beautiful." David Rooney of The Hollywood Reporter wrote, "If the director's generally taut original screenplay settles on an ending too cryptic to be fully satisfying, the performances of Denzel Washington and Rami Malek as cops from the old school and the new who end up having more in common than they anticipated supply enough glue to hold everything together. Add in Jared Leto as the taunting weirdo who becomes their prime suspect in a series of brutal murders, and you have a suspenseful crime thriller with a dark allure."

Writing for The Globe and Mail, Barry Hertz gave the film two and a half out of four stars, explaining, "Hancock keeps the action moving briskly and with little tonal confusion, highlighting just what a polished studio-favoured professional can do when given gobs of money and zero intellectual-property obligations. And his trio of leading men are all given ample space to play to their strengths."

Benjamin Lee of The Guardian gave the film two out of five stars, specifying, "at a time when even small-screen procedurals have perma-frowned detectives who spend more time haunted by their past than actually solving crimes in the present, it all feels a little too familiar and a little too minor." Writing for RogerEbert.com, Brian Tallerico gave the film two out of four stars, and said, "It feels like Hancock is trying to tell a very True Detective story—one about how a case can pull the people investigating it apart from the inside in a way that breaks them forever—but he can't figure out how to shape that into an intriguing mystery simultaneously."

Nick Schager of The Daily Beast wrote, "The ghost of Seven lives on with The Little Things, as does Denzel Washington's search for the type of great serial killer thriller he missed out on when he turned down the lead role in David Fincher's 1995 genre classic. John Lee Hancock's film [...] is deeply indebted in both style and plot particulars to that predecessor, although unfortunately for it—and its headliner—its modest suspense is largely offset by the fact that there's nothing substantial or especially original lurking beneath its eerie exterior."

=== Accolades ===
Leto was nominated for Best Supporting Actor – Motion Picture at the 78th Golden Globe Awards and Outstanding Performance by a Male Actor in a Supporting Role at the 27th Screen Actors Guild Awards. The Little Things won Best Drama Poster at the 2021 Golden Trailer Awards.
