= Project 20 =

American TV documentary series (1956–1969)

Project 20 is the overall title of an irregularly scheduled series of American television documentaries broadcast on NBC beginning on December 27, 1955, The series "was one of the first nonfiction presentations of American history seen on American television". A review in 1961 referred to the project's "mastery of the TV form that makes history come alive informatively and entertainingly". The show's production unit "was disbanded for economy reasons" in 1967, but episodes that had been completed were broadcast through May 11, 1969.

The title was sometimes written as Project XX, and the episodes were sometimes called "telementaries". Episodes of the series were also broadcast in Austria, Belgium, Denmark, Holland, Italy, Sweden, Switzerland, Australia, and England. Some were shown on the Christian Broadcasting Network cable service in the 1980s as part of a package of 55 documentaries licensed to CBN by NBC Enterprises.

== Overview ==
The title was intended to "reflect the status of the world in the 20th century". Episodes mixed filmed and "live-on-film" content in whatever way worked best for each topic. Producer Henry Salomon said that the goal of Project 20 was to create "a kind of composite picture of the 20th century and 20th century man — who he is, what he is, and why he is." Each episode was "a self-contained dramatic unit", but together they were intended to be assembled to "form a composite history". Writer Richard Hanser said that they did not want the productions to be "just chronological"; instead, they sought "to take the factual material and give it some sort of dramatic form".

A secondary effect of the series was preservation of old film. Daniel W. Jones, who was in charge of film research, said that much of the film was "shrunk, warped, and brittle". He explained that nitrate film deteriorates over time and can explode, a situation that caused many owners of such film "to junk it out of sheer prudence". Project 20's research led to preservation of film that otherwise would have been discarded. Collectors whose film was used waived their usual fees in return for having the material converted to a more stable form for their collections.

== 1955 ==
The premiere episode was "Nightmare in Red" (December 27, 1955). Pre-empting Armstrong Circle Theatre, the episode used film from 76 sources to report on life in Russia from the beginning of the 20th century. Some of that film had never been shown publicly; some of it had not been seen in decades. It was gathered from both private collectors and film distributors in England, France, Germany, and the United States. Completion of the episode required more than six months' work. The episode depicted a civil war, famines, revolutions, and killing of masses of people. Viewers saw Lenin, Stalin, Trotsky, and the last czar, among others. Salomon produced and directed the episode and was its co-writer with Hanser. Isaac Kleinerman edited the film, and Alexander Scourby narrated.

The episode was repeated on January 24, 1956. The president of Armstrong Cork Company said that many requests to repeat the program had arrived in each day's mail, some from people who wanted to see the program again and others from people who missed its original broadcast and wanted to see it. Its September 3, 1960, showing was its fourth broadcast.

"Nightmare in Red" received a special Encyclopædia Britannica Films award in 1956 as the best educational television program of the year. In 1959, it was a recipient of one of the 10th annual Scholastic Teacher Film Awards, the 24th award it had received. The McGraw-Hill company distributed films of the episode to schools.

Broadcasts of this episode were limited to North America and South America. Rights to use the Russian film clips in it were restricted because Artkino Pictures, which distributed Soviet films, said that "Nightmare in Red" was not "an objective picture". A spokesman for Artkino said, "certain costume scenes which were obviously from Russian motion pictures and not from newsreels were presented on the program as being the real thing." Salomon replied that the film scenes were symbols and that the episode did not distort the truth.

=== Sponsorship withdrawal ===
Pontiac originally planned to sponsor Project 20 episodes, but it cancelled that sponsorship in October 1955 with no explanation to NBC. The trade publication Variety said, "... informed persons on Ad Row have no doubts in their own minds that General Motors is adopting discretion as the better part of democratic valor and future trade." Pontiac's advertising agency said that a "basic misunderstanding" led to the cancellation. The cancellation led to a delay in the program's premiere, which had been scheduled for November 1955. The report in Variety added that Electric Companies Advertising and Monsanto Chemical each were possible replacement sponsors.

=== Critical response ===
Associated Press writer Charles Mercer call the program "one of the best televised documentary films of the year". He praised the research, writing, and film editing that he said put Communism's methods and dangers in an understandable context.

A review in The (Baltimore) Sun said that the episode was "an eminently objective and accurate summary of the convulsions which afflicted Russia for half a century", and a review in The (Washington) Evening Star called the episode "documentary dynamite" and added, "It should be required viewing for students and grown-ups."

== 1956 ==
The Project 20 episodes in 1956 were sponsored by Norelco.

=== "The Twisted Cross" (March 14, 1956) ===
The episode focused on Adolf Hitler and Nazis as representative of the general concept of how dictators rise and fall. Most of it depicted events and characters as the German people saw them. Salomon said, "In the Hitler story, we had a chance to do a thorough, rather than merely episodic, treatment of great events as seen through alien eyes." The production showed growth of the Nazi movement from the "wretchedness of Germany after World War I". In addition to Hitler, Hermann Göring, Joseph Goebbels, and Heinrich Himmler were shown as they emerged into Nazi leadership positions. The program contained a German-made filmed reconstruction of an attempt to assassinate Hitler with a bomb in 1944. Scourby narrated with the script written by Salomon and Hanser. Robert Russell Bennett composed the score and conducted it. The Project 20 staff viewed approximately 5 million feet of film preparing for the broadcast. The crew brought 150,000 feet of film to New York to be edited down to 4,800 feet in the one-hour broadcast.

The audience for the initial broadcast was estimated to be 34 million people — at that time the most ever for any network's "one-shot documentary". A repeat was aired on June 12, 1956. That rerun included a preview of the upcoming production, "The Jazz Age". West German television showed it in March 1956. Another American repeat, on January 31, 1960, included a new prologue and epilogue in which Frank McGee connected then-current incidents of Nazi vandalism with the history of Nazism.

==== Critical Response ====
Larry Wolters wrote in the Chicago Daily Tribune, that the production's "narration and music almost were superfluous" because the images "wonderfully depicted" the effects of Nazi rule. Those pictures, Wolters said, showed some Germans dedicated to obeying and following Hitler's commands, while others "hated and despised Hitler and risked their lives to eliminate him".

A review in the trade publication Motion Picture Daily called the program "a stunning show ... particularly in its delineation of the emotions of a time and of a people". The review added that the show would have benefited from more facts rather than generalizations, and it noted that while some scenes were "patently staged shots from post-war German films", that fact was neither mentioned in narration nor stated in credits. That flaw, it said, tended "to undermine, if not alienate, audience belief" in the truth that the episode sought to depict.

A review in the trade publication Broadcasting said of the condensing of 25 years of German history into 53 minutes of air time, "That they managed to accomplish this feat and still remain historically true is remarkable in itself." It commended Scourby's narration and Bennett's musical score.

=== "The Great War" (October 16, 1956) ===
Film segments in The Great War covered people and events between 1914 and 1918 that changed the world. Military and political leaders depicted in the films included Kaiser Wilhelm, Marshal Foch, General Pershing, and Woodrow Wilson, and viewers saw entertainers such as Douglas Fairbanks, Mary Pickford, Charlie Chaplin, and Marie Dressler. Filmed activities included the German army taking Belgium and France, the sinking of the Lusitania, the Battle of the Somme, military use of gas in war, and Richthofen's Flying Circus engaged in aerial battles with the Lafayette Escadrille.

==== Critical response ====
In a review distributed by the Associated Press, Charles Mercer called the program "absorbing television entertainment" but added that he felt that it presented a "curiously romantic" view of war. He pointed out that the broadcast showed "only a few dead bodies" and that it had "no view of the starving millions in Belgium", speculating that Salomon put more emphasis on entertainment than on instruction with regard to World War I. On the other hand, Mercer said, "An accurate picture of the slaughter, starvation and pestilence of war ... is perhaps too strong for the television audience."

John Lester wrote in The (York, Pennsylvania) Gazette and Daily that he found no reason for showing The Great War or any of the preceding Project 20 installments, nor did he see "substantial evidence of a documentary technique worth mentioning in any of them". Lester explained that many elements of the program had been seen previously in films and on television and that even the music was little more than a sampling of songs from World War I. He concluded that NBC "could (and should) have found far more powerful, effective and novel ways" to achieve the project's stated goals.

Sheila Gallagher, writing in The (Washington, D. C.) Evening Star, called the program "a tightly edited, rawly powerful narrative" but added that it would have benefitted from more interpretation of significant battles and other events. She praised the show's production and writing, and she concluded by saying that it "possessed all the qualities of suspense and action, happily punctuated by some lightness, which all in all made for outstanding viewing".

=== "The Jazz Age" (December 6, 1956) ===
Narrated by Fred Allen, the episode covered 1919-1929 and was a "companion piece" to "The Great War". More than 100 film sources were used, showing people such as Presidents Wilson, Harding, Coolidge, and Hoover; Al Capone; F. Scott Fitzgerald; Al Smith; George Gershwin; and Charles Lindbergh.

==== Critical response ====
A review in Time magazine said that although the episode "lost or overlooked some of the decade’s juicy memories", it still presented "the tangy essences that should send oldtimers on a sentimental binge and plunge the younger set into wistful incredulity". The review noted the "stirringly nostalgic" sound track and the "authentic ring" of Allen's narration.

Jack Gould wrote in The New York Times that the episode "was often immensely interesting and certainly nostalgic", but he still found parts of it to be superficial with hard-to-excuse omissions. He felt thar the episode needed more depth and analysis and that Allen's commentary "was not too helpful".

==== Repeat ====
''Nightmare in Red" (January 24, 1956)

== 1957 ==
=== "Call to Freedom" (January 7, 1957) ===
The reopening of the Vienna State Opera House on November 5, 1955, was this episode's focal point. That occasion celebrated Austrians' return to freedom after years of being under control of first Nazis, then Communists. The opening event was a performance of Ludwig van Beethoven's opera Fidelio, the score of which provided background music for the episode, which mixed scenes from the opera with views of "the old, imperial splendor of Austria". Salomon commented that the story of a country's fight for freedom was about more than Austria's history, saying that it "transcends any single nation". He noted the similarity of that story to the then-current situation in Hungary. The production's script, written by Philip H. Reisman Jr., said

Fidelio has become more than an opera, its music much more than an evening's entertainment. It is a call to freedom. And it is also a paean to all who are free and would remain free, to all who are not and would be, to those who have sung of freedom.

Karl Böhm directed the Vienna Philharmonic for the opera. The program also used other works of Beethoven as background music for scenes such as Nazis marching and a hurdy-gurdy sequence. Scourby narrated the episode.

After the production was "widely panned" following its initial broadcast, NBC broadcast it again on May 5, 1957, updating the show with narration and commentary by Charles Van Doren.

==== Critical response ====
Donald Kirkley wrote in The Baltimore Sun that the episode "was altogether as mixed-up a thing as television has had to offer". Kirkley said that the story was too complex to be told within the constraints of a TV documentary, and he added that creating a parallel between the opera and Austria's history "was a far-fetched thing". He disliked interruptions of the opera to show film clips and interruptions of narrations of history to show the opera, and he suggested that the episode "may prove to be a serious setback in the development of the Project 20 idea".

Gould's review in The New York Times said that the production's mix of film clips, opera, and narration, although a commendable concept, "must be regretted". Gould commended the operatic aspects of the program from both performance and technical aspects, but he said that intrusions of historical elements diminished the music's effect: "Where the scenes from Fidelio gripped the viewer emotionally, the supplementary newsreel clippings and ornate narration merely got in the way."

=== "The Innocent Years" (November 21, 1957) ===
Depicting life from 1900 to 1917, "The Innocent Years" covered topics that included the first automobiles, the last steamboats, New York's growth, industry's growth, child labor, fashions, theater, warfare on the Mexican border, and the San Francisco earthquake. People shown in film segments included William Jennings Bryan, Charlie Chaplin, Thomas Edison, Lillian Gish, Lillian Russell, Theodore Roosevelt, William Howard Taft, and the Keystone Cops. The score included 21 of that era's songs, described by Bennett as "so enchanting, so stupid — and so adorable". The episode was first repeated on July 18, 1960.

Beginning with immigrants arriving in New York City, the episode included rarely seen film from President William McKinley's funeral and the only known surviving motion pictures of Mark Twain. The film, made by Thomas Edison's company, showed Samuel Clemens and his daughters having tea. Footage of McKinley's successor, Theodore Roosevelt, in a variety of activities formed "the major thread" of the episode.

=== Critical response ===
Charles Mercer wrote in a review distributed by the Associated Press that the episode contradicted any "snob who does not believe that television can provide artful entertainment". Mercer described the narration as "absorbing" and added that the musical score "helped capture the authentic atmosphere of the age".

A review in Time cited highlights of the episode while noting that the presentation "glossed over its slums and sweatshops". It pointed out Scourby's "deft commentary" and Bennett's "eloquent orchestration of 23 vintage song hits".

J. P. Shanley wrote in The New York Times that the producer and editor "chose their subject matter wiseley", giving appropriate amounts of attention to different kinds of events of the era. He added that the narration "was colorful and interesting".

== 1958 ==
"Call to Freedom" and "Nightmare in Red" were repeated.

Salomon died on February 1, 1958, after he had completed work on a Project 20 episode about the 1930s, which "he thought was his finest work to date", and he hoped would be broadcast in the spring of 1958. Although NBC executives liked the finished product, the network did not show it "because many potential bankrollers were scared off by brief scenes of labor violence and unrest of the period".

== 1959 ==
=== "Meet Mr. Lincoln" (February 11, 1959) ===
Unlike preceding Project 20 episodes, this one was 30 minutes long, and it used no archival film, only still photographs from the time of Abraham Lincoln. Use of still photos was not static, however, as "The camera wanders purposely about each picture to uncannily produce movement and expression." Scourby narrated. Recognizing that volumes of material about Lincoln had already been published, the production staff sought to approach the topic in a way that debunked myths about the man and depicted his humanity in addition to his greatness.

Lincoln National Life Insurance Company sponsored the broadcast. Hyatt said that part-way through working on the project, NBC offered to make a full hour available, but he and the other executives felt that it would be more effective in the shorter version. Nevertheless, he said, "... every element that went into the production of it took longer than our average hour show. We all put that much more into it." Work on the nearly year-long project included examining 25,000 photographs from the Civil War.

Hanser's script, which included many of Lincoln's own words, won the Robert E. Sherwood Award for its "application of a brilliant technique to a familiar and important subject".

==== Critical response ====
William Ewald praised the program in a review distributed by United Press International. He called it "a half hour of considerable richness" and added that the photo treatment plus the musical score "gave its 30 minutes immediacy and pulse". The review said that the only flaw ("and it was a minor one") was the amount of narration; "it was difficult to grasp both pictures and words because of the galloping pace of both".

Steven H. Scheuer called the episode "one of the best documentary films ever produced for television!" His preview of it in The Hammond Times complimented the use of camera focus and movement to convey a feeling of action to complement the narration. He wrote, "Seeing a film like this and realizing just how good television can be when care, taste and patience are utilized, it's got to make you a little sick to think of how few times TV comes close to achieving its potential."

Harriet Van Horne wrote for the Scripps-Howard newspaper chain that the show "evoked the spirit of a great man in a manner so vivid, so poignant, as to bring tears to the eyes". She noted the results of the moving cameras with still pictures, "producing the cumulative effect of a newsreel montage." She pointed out one case "in which cannon actually seemed to be booming".

=== "Life in the Thirties" (October 16, 1959) ===
"Life in the Thirties" was a one-hour revised version of "Back in the Thirties", a 90-minute episode that was completed in 1957 but was not broadcast in the United States. The first version was distributed in England and other countries, and it won an award at the Edinburgh International Film Festival in 1957. The New York Times reported that some media observers had wondered if the episode failed to gain a sponsor because big businesses might not want to be associated with its subject matter of the Depression and Franklin D. Roosevelt's administration. Hyatt explained the revision by saying that the first program "was heavy with a political and economic outlook." He acknowledged some similarities in the two versions but said that the revised version "puts more emphasis on the social and humanistic view", which was lacking in its predecessor.

==== Critical response ====
Shanley called the episode "a fascinating hour of television" in a review in The New York Times. He wrote that the review was done "with excellent judgment and balance" with the script providing "informed commentary", accompanied by a "stirring score of contemporary musical selections".

== 1960 ==
=== "Mark Twain's America" (April 22, 1960) ===
Focusing on the span between 1865 and 1900 in the United States, this episode supplemented the still-photograph technique used in "Meet Mr. Lincoln" with new films made on location. The narration included comments from Twain and his contemporaries to help viewers see that part of America's history as Twain saw it. Hyatt said that Twain would essentially be the viewer's tour guide as the production explored "the whole of America of his day — cities and villages, plains and rivers, as well as music and folklore". Jones and his assistant considered nearly 1 million photographs during a four-month search as they selected the images used in the broadcast. Most of the research occurred in the Library of Congress, which Jones said "had barrels and barrels of uncatalogued photos hidden up in a non-air-conditioned top-floor cubbyhole". In addition to images' historic value, the Project 20 staff looked for facial expressions that made an image "an effective shot for the show".

==== Critical response ====
Jack Gould wrote in The New York Times, "... the program was a rewarding hour of history". Gould complimented the moving-camera technique that created "a feeling of action and lifelike quality" from the still photos, some of which were "especially fine pictures of the nineteenth century's Gilded Age". Howard Lindsay's narration drew praise in the review, as did Bennett's score.

A review in Time magazine said that the episode "movingly remembered what happened to Mark, from his Hannibal, Mo. boyhood in the 1840s to the day of his death" and pointed out the effective use of images to relate the times that influenced Twain's life.

=== "Not So Long Ago" (February 19, 1960) ===
Bob Hope narrated the episode that reported on events from VJ Day to the beginning of the Korean War. Events included Harry Truman's upset of Thomas E. Dewey in the 1948 presidential election in the United States. Other topics covered included Congressional hearings, flying saucers, the Marshall Plan, sports, and television.

=== "Those Ragtime Years" (November 22, 1960) ===
Hoagy Carmichael was host of the episode that featured his music, focusing on the popularity of ragtime music from 1896 to the beginning of World War I. The style's development was traced "from African-originated rhythms of the South through the ballads and folk tunes from New England". Carmichael narrated, sang, and played the piano in the program, and pianist Eubie Blake contributed a solo. They were joined by Ralph Sutton and Dick Wellstood for a finale of "Maple Leaf Rag" played on four pianos. Film clips showed dances associated with that era, including the Cakewalk and the Turkey Trot. Other clips showed scenes from the Chicago World's Fair and the St Louis World's Fair. Hyatt was the executive producer, and Willima Nichols was the writer and producer. The Purex Company was the sponsor.

==== Critical response ====
Gould wrote in The New York Times, "Carmichael's narrative was perhaps the most interesting aspect of the program" as the era "was recounted with affection". Combining those words with the musical score, Gould said, "brought an era truly to life". He added that the episode would have been better if it had pointed out more about how ragtime music influenced contemporary popular music.

Robert Johnson wrote in the Memphis Press-Scimitar that the episode fell a bit short of the quality of preceding Project 20 productions, "but it was still a pleasant, nostalgic look at some of the oddities and appealing characteristics" of the era. He noted film clips of Theodore Roosevelt chopping wood and dances by Little Egypt and Vernon and Irene Castle as making the episode worth viewing.

=== "The Coming of Christ" (December 21, 1960) ===
More than 95 percent of the script of "The Coming of Christ" came from the King James Version of the Bible, with Scourby narrating, and the episode drew on "hundreds of the world's greatest paintings" for the visual component of the color broadcast. The original sizes of the approximately 300 paintings used on the air (of 2,000 that were considered) ranged from miniatures to wall-size. Artists whose works were shown included Caravaggio, Holbein, Raphael, Rembrandt, and Rubens. Some of the featured works were in museums, and others were at publishing companies. Some that were in illuminated manuscripts had never been shown in the United States in theaters or on television. The focus on Christ was supplemented by depictions of what the world was like when He lived.

As with the episodes about Twain and Lincoln, the episode used the still-pictures-in-motion technique, but this episode involved an intermediate step. The steps used with motion-picture cameras in that process could not be employed with paintings mounted on walls, so the staff used still cameras to make color transparencies of the paintings. The animation process was then applied to those transparencies.

The episode began with prophetic passages that announced the coming of a Messiah and concluded with the Sermon on the Mount. It used the complete account of the birth of Christ found in the Gospel of Luke. Hanser, who wrote the script, said, "It is astonishing how perfectly Luke's story fits as TV narration. The beautiful simplicity of it! Not a word wasted." Hyatt produced and directed, and Bennett wrote an original score. based on the Georgian chant "O Dulcissimo Jesu". Sponsored by United States Steel, the episode contained no commercials. The only mentions of the sponsor came in legally required brief announcements at the beginning and end of the episode.

Hyatt's initial proposal for this episode "met with considerable opposition". Concerns that were expressed included potential dislike from Christian sects and from non-Christians, disapproval from lovers of art, and the thought that "the general public wouldn't take to the idea at all". After the broadcast an influx of letters requested that copies of the film be made available for showing at meetings of churches and civic, educational, and social organizations, and U. S. Steel made them available.

Decca Records released a recording, The Coming of Christ (DL79093), in 1961 with Scourby reading from Hanser's script and "reverent and expressive" background music by Bennett. Packaged with the recording were prints of 11 old masters' paintings that were shown on the broadcast.

The production won awards at international film festivals in Edinburgh, Vancouver, and Venice. It was repeated on December 20, 1961.

==== Critical response ====
Gould, in a review in The New York Times, called the broadcast "a work of permanence, a program of exceptional beauty and reverence that will rank as one of television's lasting accomplishments". He praised the camera techniques that imparted a sense of motion to the still works of art: "The effect was to capture a feeling of the magnificence and grandeur of the originals yet retain the fluidity of the continuing story." Bennett's score, Gould added, "was of an inspired order".

Johnson wrote in the Memphis Press-Scimitar that the program "is impressive in black and white, and in color it is overwhelmingly beautiful and moving". Writing in advance of the 1961 rerun, he said, "it was rightly acclaimed a magnificent achievement and a distinguished work of television art".

In a review distributed by United Press International, Fred Danig praised the program overall and emphasized the effect of the still-pictures-in-motion technique: "When done well, it's powerful stuff and it certainly was done well Wednesday night."

=== "Victory at Sea" (December 29, 1960) ===
The original Victory at Sea documentary TV series comprised 26 episodes and began in 1952. This 90-minute production contained just over one-tenth of that film footage. Among scenes in this edited version were battles (including Guadalcanal and the invasion of Normandy) and Navy pilots (some of whom were wounded) landing their planes on an aircraft carrier in the Pacific Ocean. One of the latter scenes showed a sailor from the carrier going into the cockpit of a burning plane to rescue the pilot after his aircraft crash-landed on the ship's deck. Close-up footage of "sailors, soldiers, Marines, inmates of concentration camps, relatives of fighting men and others who were part of the war and the victory" added a personal perspective to the episode.

This broadcast was the TV debut of this condensed version of Victory at Sea, although it had been shown in theaters. The success of the original Victory at Sea series provided the impetus for launching Project 20.

==== Critical response ====
Shanley wrote in The New York Times that the edited version of Victory at Sea maintained the "quality and power" of the original, with the added benefit of a continuity that could not be maintained in the weekly broadcasts. He commended the script, musical score, editing, narration, production, and direction.

=== Repeats ===
"The Twisted Cross" was repeated on January 31, 1960. In the summer of 1960 six episodes were rerun in chronological order, beginning with "The Innocent Years" on July 18. It was followed by "The Jazz Age", "The Great War", "Life in the Thirties", "Nightmare in Red", and "Not So Long Ago".

== 1961 ==
=== "The Story of Will Rogers" (March 28, 1961) ===
Bob Hope narrated the episode about Rogers, which contained film clips and still photographs of the humorist in addition to excerpts from recordings of his appearances on radio. Hanser and Rod Reed were the writers, and Bennett composed the score. Hanser commented that while the American landscape had changed from Rogers's time, most of his observations about American life were as appropriate in 1961 as they were when he lived. Hanser said of the episode's audio, "Whenever possible we're using his own voice, and we're bridging it with Bob Hope's narration." The Purex Corporation sponsored the broadcast.

=== "The Real West" (March 29, 1961) ===
Narrated by Gary Cooper, "The Real West" portrayed characters from the Old West that differed from those usually seen in films and on TV. It was divided into six segments: "The Way West", "The Gold Seekers", "The Herdsmen", "The Leather-Slappers", "The Civilizers", and "The Indians". John Wesley Hardin, Doc Holliday, Billy the Kid, the James brothers, and the Earp brothers were among those included in the episode.

Hyatt said that the vanity many outlaws of that era led them to have studio photographs made "just before or after some classic malefaction". He added that lawmen sometimes followed up by having them photographed "on mortuary slabs, dangling from do-it-yourself gallows or posed artistically propped against a wall".

Photographs in the episode were animated via the still-pictures-in-motion technique, and the Project 20 crew filmed new motion pictures of Western sites where significant events occurred. Philip Reisman Jr. wrote the episode, and Bennett composed the score and conducted the orchestra. The Savings and Loan Foundation sponsored the broadcast.

==== Cooper's condition ====
"The Real West" was Cooper's last performance and his only significant appearance on TV; it was broadcast six weeks before he died. During the making of the episode, cancer sometimes sapped his strength enough that he had to go to a hotel room for a few hours or even a day, sometimes taking oxygen while he was there. After such a rest he returned to work to continue the project. He kept the seriousness of his condition secret from the production staff, attributing those absences to "acute arthritis of the neck". Knowing that he was dying when he agreed to narrate the episode, Cooper "wanted to set the record straight" about the real story of the West. Hanser said that when work on the project was completed, Cooper went to Los Angeles and "As far as I know, he never left his home again."

==== Recognition ====
The episode received the 1961 Prix Italia grand prize as the best TV documentary among those submitted from 16 countries. It had been selected as the American entry over 14 other documentaries evaluated by the Broadcasting Foundation of America. It shared top honors in the history category at the American Film Festival awards in 1962. Also in 1962 it was selected by the Council on International Nontheatrical Events as one of two TV documentaries (and 59 films overall) to be submitted to film festivals around the work in coming months. The Writers Guild of America's 1962 award for best documentary went to Reisman for his script for the program. "The Real West" was one of three winners of the second annual Western Heritage Awards in January 1962.

==== Critical response ====
Pete Rahn, writing in the St. Louis Globe-Democrat, called the program "a smash hit" and "one of the brightest TV documentaries of the current season" and noted the "exceptionally fine production effort with the still-pictures-in-motion technique".

Gould wrote in The New York Times that the episode's visual effects "conveyed a truly living sense of the historic West" while the narration was "packed with modern bite, humor, and tart observation." He said that the episode was "a fascinatingly authentic look at the West".

=== Repeats ===
"The Great War" (July 4, 1961)

"The Story of Will Rogers" (September 12, 1961)

"The Coming of Christ" (December 20, 1961)

== 1962 ==
=== "Cops and Robbers" (March 18, 1962) ===
Edward G. Robinson, void of his gangster persona from films, narrated the episode that dealt with crime in the United States, ranging from the execution of a mutinous Pilgrim in 1630 to investigations of crime by the United States Senate in the early 1960s. Visual elements included drawings, mug shots, and clips from newsreels and movies. Reisman wrote the script, and Bennett composed the score. While the overall approach was "roughly chronological", reporting on earlier years was compressed to allow more time for the most recent century. Robinson commented in an interview, "Today, crime is one of our biggest industries." He said that illegal gambling alone took in more than $57 billion per year — "more than General Motors, U. S. Steel and Ford combined".

Four aspects of a theme intertwined throughout the episode:

- Lawlessness and forces of law have been in conflict since America was founded.
- Crime is a part of American culture.
- Attitudes and actions of the public "shape the face of crime".
- Crime might be winning its battle against the law.

==== Critical response ====
Writing in The Evening Star, Bernie Harrison said that the episode "gave TV its snap, crackle and pop last night, but with the added zing of perspective and the urgency of a national alarm". The review complimented the script, narration, score, and research involved in making the documentary.

In a review distributed by United Press International, Rick du Brow said that although the episode contained "brilliantly edited film clips of the old Chicago gang wars", the writing was tight, and the research was thorough, it was "a superficial study of the history of American crime". He pointed out topics that were "glaringly omitted from probing", including the capital-punishment controversy, white-collar crimes, and the effects of films and TV programs that glorified gangsters.

=== "He Is Risen" (April 15, 1962) ===
"He Is Risen" began with the raising of Lazarus from the tomb and went through Jesus's resurrection. Like "The Coming of Christ", this episode used images created by master painters, including El Greco, Rembrandt, Rubens, Titian, and Van Dyck, "sometimes in closeups of faces, sometimes traveling slowly over a broad canvas, sometimes showing the whole". The 300 paintings used in the program were selected from thousands of originals and reproductions examined by researchers. Hanser, who wrote the script, said that the challenge was to ensure "that the tragic element in the story is, at the end, overwhelmed and overcome by the glory and wonder of the Resurrection". The narration came from the King James Version of the Bible. U. S. Steel sponsored the commercial-free program.

==== Critical response ====
Cyntha Lowry, in a review distributed by the Associated Press, wrote that with the use of paintings by masters "... the Easter story had impact and power beyond a mere dramatization by actors".

=== Repeats ===
"The Real West" (March 25, 1962)

"The Story of Will Rogers" (September 14, 1962)

== 1963 ==
=== "The Tall American - Gary Cooper" (March 26, 1963) ===
Walter Brennan, a long-time friend of Cooper, narrated this documentary on the life of the actor, about whom script writer Hanser said, "The roles he played made Gary Cooper into a kind of contemporary myth or legend, such as Sir Galahad and Robin Hood." In contrast to such roles, the documentary presented the human side of Cooper, rather than the screen version. It supplemented scenes from his films with archival news footage, home movies provided by Cooper's wife, and films of many places where he lived. Bennett composed the episode's original score.

The episode was repeated on August 15, 1965.

==== Critical response ====
Gould wrote in a review in The New York Times that the episode "was primarily an hour's affectionate appreciation rather than a work of much insight", so that viewers gained little knowledge about Cooper from seeing it. Gould commented that the program "did not attempt very seriously to separate the private individual from the public luminary" and added that the Project 20 series, like other biographies of that era, tended to rely less on "hard reportorial legwork" and more on material available in a film library.

=== "That War in Korea" (November 19, 1963) ===
Script writer Hanser said that deciding on a title for this episode was difficult because no official designation of war was made. The script related the reason for the title: "It looked like war. It hurt like war. It was war. It was that war in Korea." As part of the narration, quotations from soldiers who fought there accompanied newsreel footage of battles, In some instances that personal perspective was reinforced by comments spoken by the veterans themselves. Key individuals in the episode included Douglas MacArthur, other generals, and President Harry Truman, who were directly involved with the war. Dwight D. Eisenhower, and Adlai Stevenson were included, "both emerging as political personalities". Richard Boone was the narrator.

Initial plans called for the episode to be one hour long, but during the more than two years that it was in production, it was expanded to 90 minutes. Producer-director Hyatt said that the rich film footage available led to the expansion. He added that the film was "even more probing in relationship to the human aspect of war than the Victory at Sea footage was". Researchers found 500 hours of film related to the war stored at a facility of the United States Army Signal Corps. Of that amount, 45 hours' footage was reviewed by Hanser and Hyatt to determine what would be used on the air.

==== Critical response ====
Gould criticized the episode's use of cliches and what he called "a disconcerting superficiality". His review in The New York Times said that the program lacked the viewpoint that an experienced historian could have provided, offering instead "such highlights as could be illustrated from newsreel footage".

Harvey Pack wrote in The Oregonian, "NBC is to be congratulated for putting the Korean War in its proper perspective and, by so doing, paying tribute to the men who gave their lives in a conflict that often failed to make the front pages of our newspapers."

=== Repeats ===
"Victory at Sea" (December 7, 1963)

== 1964 ==
=== "The Red, White and Blue" (June 9, 1964) ===
Brennan narrated this episode, which examined an apparent decline in patriotic fervor over time. Hyatt commented that at the turn of the 20th century the United States had "an almost naive and exuberant display of patriotism — a simple and basic pride in being American". By the mid-1960s, he said, patriotism was primarily found in small towns, tributes to dead military personnel, refugees, and newly naturalized citizens.

The episode contained historical material and film of recent events. As was done with other Project 20 episodes, the still-pictures-in-motion technique was used for old paintings, photographs, sketches, and posters. Historical film clips included scenes of patriotic activity at the turn of the century. Then-recent events that were shown included:

- an Independence Day celebration in Faith, North Carolina
- a Memorial Day parade in Noank, Connecticut
- the Iwo Jima ceremony at the Marine Memorial in Arlington, Virginia
- a naturalization ceremony at the Marine Corps Recruitment Depot in San Diego, California
- a visit to the closed immigration facilities at Ellis Island, with audio of comments from immigrants who were naturalized there

Contrasting elements included coverage of activities by the American Nazi Party, the Communist Party USA, and the Ku Klux Klan.

March music on a radio caused Hyatt to consider an episode with a patriotic focus. Subsequently, he experienced a fife-and-drums muster that included costumed corps and flying flags. "That's when I knew what kind of a show we would do," he said.

==== Critical response ====
Tashman wrote in The (Richmond, California) Independent that the episode was "a beautiful, sentimental, moving and hardhitting production", one that deserved awards. He said that the Ellis Island segment affected him because his father and grandmother went through that facility when the father was 10 years old and commented that the millions of people who had passed through there had become part of "the amalgam that is America".

=== Repeats ===
"The Real West" (September 9, 1964)

== 1965-1966 ==
Three episodes were announced for broadcast during the 1965-1966 television season. None of them appeared in those years, but they were broadcast later:

- "The Law and the Prophets"
- "End of the Trail"
- "Immigrants All"

=== Repeats ===
"The Tall American" (August 15, 1965)

== 1967 ==
=== "The Island Called Ellis" (January 13, 1967) ===
Centered around Ellis Island, this one-hour episode (originally titled "Immigrants All" and planned for broadcast in 1965) related "the American dream through immigrants' eyes and as realized by their devoted efforts". Hanser was the writer, and Bennett composed and conducted the music. José Ferrer was the narrator of the January 13, 1967, episode.

The episode grew out of the earlier Project 20 broadcast "The Red, White and Blue". Public and critical reaction to the Ellis Island segment of that broadcast led to the second, more in-depth, report. The scope of the project was trimmed from the original plan of beginning with Plymouth Rock. Although the title specified Ellis Island, the episode dealt with all immigrants, not just those who came through that facility. "Many striking still pictures" illustrated the diversity of people who were admitted to the United States through Ellis Island.

==== Critical response ====
Writing in The (Baltimore) Sun, Donald Kirkley called the episode "a vivid, deeply moving story in which there were no stars".

Gould wrote in a review in The New York Times that the episode "was a quietly effective presentation of modest historical interest." The review suggested that use of interviews would have improved the episode, allowing viewers to hear immigrants relate "the anxieties and excitement" that they felt as they entered the United States.

=== “End of the Trail" (March 16, 1967) ===
Research for photographs for 'The Real West" episode led to discovery of so many pictures of Native Americans that NBC decided to make another episode to give their point of view. Reisman, who studied Indian lore from childhood, wrote the script for the episode and its predecessor, "The Real West". He recalled how Cooper's voice broke while reading Chief Joseph's surrender in that episode. The actor and the writer had discussed doing that same type of story from Native Americans' perspective, and Reisman persevered after Cooper's death. Research in private collections, museums, and libraries provided pictures of some of the native people who lost their land as homesteaders and people in search of gold migrated west. The still-pictures-in-motion technique was used to accompany narration by Brennan. Bennett composed and conducted the music for the hour-long episode, which was originally planned to be broadcast in 1965–1966.

=== "The Law and the Prophets" (April 23, 1967) ===
Originally planned to be broadcast in 1965–1966, the hour-long episode began with the Book of Genesis in the Old Testament, tracing Israel's kings and prophets as time went on. Hyatt said that the law and prophets were selected as the focus "because the truths they proclaimed became the ethical treasures of Western man". The still-pictures-in-motion technique applied to paintings from 70 museums and private collections provided visual depictions of the Old Testament's basic message in this episode. Hanser wrote the script, and Bennett composed and conducted the music. Preparation for, and production of, the episode took two years. Two main factors in the preparation were condensing the story to fit the allotted time and locating paintings needed to illustrate key points. The episode was sponsored by the American Gas Association with no commercial announcements. Scourby narrated.

== 1968 ==
=== "Down to the Sea in Ships" (December 13, 1968) ===
With Burgess Meredith narrating, this episode examined "the beauty and mystery of the ships and the magic of the sea". It used film that ranged from historic footage of ships rounding Cape Horn to recently shot scenes aboard a U. S. Coast Guard training ship that captured essence of the era of tall ships. The narration included quotations from the Bible and from works by Herman Melville, Joseph Conrad, Lord Byron, Henry Wadsworth Longfellow, Walt Whitman, and William Shakespeare. Hyatt produced and directed the episode. Hanser wrote it, and Bennett composed and conducted the music. The broadcast was originally scheduled for December 11, 1968, but it was pre-empted by an address by President Richard Nixon and moved to December 13.

==== Critical response ====
Writing in the Houston Chronicle, Ann Hodges described the episode as "a thoroughly fascinating journey", regardless of whether a viewer had experience with the sea — "a tender tribute to the seafarers, beautifully filmed and scripted, with a moving musical score".

Richard K. Shull wrote in the Indianapolis News that the episode failed to match the prestigious quality present in previous installments: "... the show never really reached a height of excitement or feeling of spectacle". He explained that it had "no continuing story", relying on anecdotes about dangers of the sea, and said that Hyatt's selection of content "seemed capricious".

== 1969 ==
=== "Meet George Washington" (April 24, 1969) ===
This episode made extensive use of George Washington's words and of images from his era in an effort to depict the real, human Washington in contrast to existing myths about him. As with Project 20's other episodes about historic people, images that were used came from a variety of sources beyond the expected museums and archives. Hyatt said that some illustrations were found in places such as old taverns' closets and basements. "One of our key pictures," he said, "showing Continental soldiers huddled in the snow on the eve of the crossing of the Delaware" was on a restaurant's wall. "If we hadn't happened to stop there for lunch we wouldn't have discovered it." Such historic images, shown with the still-pictures-in-motion technique, were complemented by use of recent film footage from sites associated with Washington. Melvyn Douglas was the narrator. Hyatt was the producer, Hanser was the writer, and Bennett was the musical director.

Work on the documentary revealed some political similarities between Washington's era and the time in which the episode was broadcast. Hyatt said that historians' research indicated that "the Revolutionary War was even more unpopular with the people at large than the Vietnam War is today". Opposition included people who resisted the war, dodged the draft, and deserted from the military. Washington had to deal with threats to his safety, including an assassination attempt and a mob that "threatened to drag him from his home into the street" in Philadelphia. He also had family problems, including difficulties with his stepchildren.

The Freedoms Foundation awarded a George Washington Medal of Honor to the American Gas Association for sponsoring the program.

==== Critical response ====
Harry Gilroy, writing in The New York Times, complimented Douglas's narration and Hyatt's success in visually extracting "the kind of vigor, motion and emotion" that artists had tried to depict in the pictures that were used. Gilroy pointed out that the color presentation revealed elements that could not have been detected if the episode had been in black-and-white. He complimented Hanser's script white noting, "sometimes essentials of Washington's story had to be skimped".

=== "Mirror of America" (May 11, 1969) ===
Washington, D. C., was the focus of this episode, which sought to relate events in American history to six landmarks — Arlington National Cemetery, the Capitol, the Jefferson Memorial, the Lincoln Memorial, the Washington Monument, and the White House — via a combination of archival motion pictures, contemporary color footage, and still images processed with the still-pictures-in-motion technique. Hyatt described the episode as "a factual dramatization" of the heritage and history of the United States. The episode contained "no attempt to evade the sentimental or to ignore tragic struggles and errors". Events featured in the episode included protests and "sudden changes in social course as embodied in the New Deal". Burgess Meredith narrated, and Hanser wrote the script.

==== Critical response ====
Gould wrote that the objective of the episode was admirable but that it was "an inevitable patchwork of superficiality" as it tried to condense the city's history into a single hour. Gould described the script as "cliche-ridden" and the narration as "self-conscious", and he questioned why the Supreme Court, "as one focal point of evolving change", was omitted.

=== Repeats ===
"Mirror of America" (September 9, 1969)

== Production ==
=== Obtaining and using old films ===
Gathering and processing the old films used in Project 20 was "a project in itself". Sources of the film included rusty film cans on Staten Island (King Albert of Belgium), a garage in California (Navy convoys in World War I), and unmarked vaults in Vienna (Emperor Franz Josef's funeral).

Jones headed the process of doing research to find historic films and then obtaining those films for use in Project 20. Some of the needed material was available from libraries of movie studios and newsreel companies and the Library of Congress. Much of it, however, came from private owners. Some of those people found old films when they inherited property. Some collectors bought cans of film from storage warehouses when it was sold after the original owners defaulted on payments for continuing storage.

The cellulose nitrate used in old films added to the project's difficulties. Jones said: "When you do come across old nitrate film, it's usually so shrunken and curled from loss of moisture that it won't go through the regular printing machines. You have to rephotograph it frame by frame. It's laborious and expensive." Paper prints of films were used for some of the earlier footage in the series. Jones explained that until 1911 the United States Copyright Office accepted paper prints of films, rather than the films themselves, to support copyright applications. He said, "Many of the prints are abominable — so dark you can scarcely see an image", but a $300,000 project supported by the Academy of Motion Picture Arts and Sciences enabled rephotographing of those images.

Jones said that production of one episode required approximately eight months. He explained that the staff might start with 3,000 cans of film, culling them to 150 that contained useful material. From those 150 they would select segments to use in the program, which would be contained in six cans of completed film.

=== Animating still images ===
Illustrating people and activities that pre-dated motion pictures led to development of the still-pictures-in-motion technique. When Project 20 executives began planning "Meet Mr. Lincoln", the first episode for which no motion pictures existed, they wanted to have still images "dissolve from one to another to give the impression of movement". When they presented their plan to an animation studio, the initial response was that it was impossible. The studio's head changed his mind, however, when he learned how much they were willing to pay. The studio head assigned the task to Fred Martell, an assistant. Martell accomplished the goal for the Lincoln episode and applied the technique to other Project 20 episodes that used still images. Eventually he had cameras made specifically for such work and went into business for himself, applying the technique for use in other TV programs.

== Recognition ==
Project 20 won two Emmy Awards and was nominated for four others. The awards won were Best Editing Of A Film For Television - 1959 (Silvio D'Alisera) and Outstanding Achievement In Composing Original Music - 1963 (Bennett). Nominations were for Best Musical Contribution For Television - 1958 (Bennett), Outstanding Writing Achievement In The Documentary Field - 1960 (Project 20), Outstanding Achievement In Original Music Composed For Television - 1962 (Bennett), and Outstanding Achievement In The Field Of Documentary Programs - 1963 (Hanser and Hyatt).
