= Kevin Lima =

American film director and animator

- Born: June 12, 1962 (age 64); Pawtucket, Rhode Island, U.S.
- Education: California Institute of the Arts
- Occupations: Film director; animator; character designer; producer
- Years active: 1985–present
- Known for: A Goofy Movie; Tarzan; 102 Dalmatians; Enchanted
- Spouse: Brenda Chapman (m. 1982)
- Children: 1
- Parent(s): Joaquin Lima; Caroline Lillian Bourdeau

Kevin Lima (born June 12, 1962) is an American film director, voice actor and animator who has directed A Goofy Movie (1995), Tarzan (1999), 102 Dalmatians (2000), and Enchanted (2007). He is married to Brenda Chapman, the head of story for The Lion King (1994), the co-director of The Prince of Egypt (1998), and the writer and director of Brave (2012).

== Life and career ==
Lima was born in Pawtucket, Rhode Island on June 12, 1962. His grandparents were both Portuguese.

Lima studied film and animation at the California Institute of the Arts, during the mid-1980s. Lima's student film Let's Misbehave was later preserved by the Academy Film Archive in 2012. After graduation, he went to Taiwan for half a year to work on The Brave Little Toaster (1987). Then, he worked on The Chipmunk Adventure (1987), where he met Glen Keane, one of many artists, who had left Disney after The Black Cauldron (1985) had failed at the box office. Keane persuaded Lima to apply at Disney, where he got a job, despite the fact that he was turned down three years earlier. At Disney, Lima worked as a character animator on The Great Mouse Detective (1986) and Oliver & Company (1988), as a character designer on The Little Mermaid (1989), The Rescuers Down Under (1990), and Beauty and the Beast (1991), and as a storyboard artist for Aladdin (1992). Wanting to direct a feature film, he left Disney for Hyperion Pictures, where he worked on the television series Itsy Bitsy Spider and films such as Bebe's Kids (1992).

He returned to Disney where he directed the animated film A Goofy Movie (1995). Before the film's release, Lima had been approached by Jeffrey Katzenberg to direct Tarzan (1999). He initially declined the offer as he was confounded by Katzenberg's decision to have the film animated in Canada under the Walt Disney Television Animation division. Months later, he was asked again by Michael Eisner to direct the film, but instead animated by the Feature Animation division. He accepted, and months later, he was paired with Chris Buck. Following the release of Tarzan (1999), Lima wanted to direct live-action films, and subsequently left Disney once again.

Soon after, Lima was offered by Glenn Close, who had voiced Kala in Tarzan, to direct her on 102 Dalmatians (2000), which had just lost its director. Afterwards, he went on to direct two television films starring Julie Andrews, Eloise at the Plaza (2003) and Eloise at Christmastime (2003). Lima was an executive producer on The Wild (2006). Since 2000, Lima had wanted to direct the film Enchanted (2007), but he was repeatedly turned down because the script was too dark, and that he was not "funny enough to do this film". The revised script eventually was green-lit, and in 2007 Enchanted was released to a positive critical reception.

After directing Enchanted (2007), Lima was set to direct several eventually shelved projects, including a live-action feature adaptation of the classic tale of Tom Thumb entitled Thumb, a film based on the Candy Land board game, a remake of the 1964 film The Incredible Mr. Limpet, a comedy film starring Hugh Jackman titled Avon Man, and an untitled live-action/CG film for Sony Pictures Animation.

In July 2011, DreamWorks Animation announced that Lima was directing Monkeys of Mumbai, a Bollywood-style animated musical adventure inspired by the Indian epic tale Ramayana, and told through the point of view of its monkeys. A. R. Rahman and Stephen Schwartz had been attached to compose the score and write the lyrics for the film, respectively. In September 2012, it was announced that the film would be released on December 19, 2015, but was half a year later rescheduled to March 18, 2016. In June 2014, the release date was pushed back to March 10, 2017. In January 2015, it was confirmed that the film was placed back into development with no release date attached. The film was ultimately cancelled after DreamWorks Animation's acquisition by Universal Pictures.

In July 2018, it was reported that Lima and Chapman had signed a first look deal with 20th Century Fox to produce live action, animated, or hybrid films through their production company.

In January 2022, Lima was attached to direct No Flying in the House, a live-action/hybrid feature film adaptation of a children's book, with Sony Pictures.

== Filmography ==
Year	Title	Credits	Notes
1987	The Chipmunk Adventure	Animator	
1987	Sport Goofy in Soccermania	Animator	
1987	The Brave Little Toaster	Animator / Character Designer / Developmental Animator	
1988	Oliver & Company	Story / Character Animator	
1989	The Little Mermaid	Character Designer	
1990	The Rescuers Down Under	Character Designer / Visual Development Artist	
1991	Beauty and the Beast	Visual Development Artist	
1991	Rover Dangerfield	Additional Character Designer	
1992	Aladdin	Story	
1995	A Goofy Movie	Director	Voiced Lester, Roxanne's Father and the Security Guard
1999	Tarzan	Director	Co-director with Chris Buck
2000	102 Dalmatians	Director	
2003	Eloise at the Plaza	Director	
2003	Eloise at Christmastime	Director	
2006	The Wild	Executive Producer	
2007	Enchanted	Director	Voiced Pip in New York
TBA	No Flying in the House	Director	

== Accolades ==
Award	Category	Title	Result	Ref.
Annie Awards	Outstanding Individual Achievement for Directing in an Animated Feature Production	Tarzan	Nominated	
Hugo Awards	Best Dramatic Presentation	Aladdin	Nominated	
Hugo Awards	Best Dramatic Presentation	Enchanted	Nominated	
Las Vegas Film Critics Society Awards	Best Animated Film	Tarzan	Nominated	
