= Let Them All Talk (soundtrack) =

Let Them All Talk (Original Motion Picture Soundtrack)

Film score by Thomas Newman
- Released: December 11, 2020
- Recorded: 2020
- Genre: Film score
- Length: 20:00
- Label: WaterTower Music
- Producer: Thomas Newman

Thomas Newman chronology
1917 (2019)	Let Them All Talk (2020)	The Little Things (2021)

Let Them All Talk (Original Motion Picture Soundtrack) is the soundtrack to the 2020 film of the same name directed, filmed, and edited by Steven Soderbergh. Featuring musical score composed and orchestrated by Thomas Newman, the album was released by WaterTower Music on December 11, 2020. It is Newman's fourth film with Soderbergh after Erin Brockovich (2000), The Good German (2006), and Side Effects (2013).

== Development ==
After completing his score for 1917 in London, Newman was contacted by Soderbergh requesting him to compose music for Let Them All Talk, which he agreed to do. He approached a 1960s jazz music for the film, as Soderbergh liked the music and Newman felt it fun to do something different and outspoken, as he was "more into the sensuality of how music hits image and can shape and structure things". Newman asked his longtime collaborator, keyboardist John Beasley, to arrange the score and perform it with his Monk'estra band. Beasley also plays the B3 organ—due to its familiarity with 1960s jazz—while recording the score at Newman Scoring Stage in 20th Century Studios. The featuring soloist include guitarist George Doering, flutist Steve Tavaglione, drummer Peter Erskine, bassist Benjamin Shepherd and percussionist Dan Greco as the core ensemble. Newman furthermore used processed samples to create wordless voices referred to the 1960s vocal group The Swingles, known for vocalized versions of classical pieces.

Soderbergh requested Newman to avoid a traditional underscore, where instead of cues carrying through scenes, they would serve as brief pieces primarily used during transitions different from how film music would do, while also wanting to be "outgoing and carry it with a kind of breeziness". Therefore, the film score consisted only 20 minutes, way lesser than traditional films. Newman said that "A lot of that is the nature of how drama is unfolding, so it's often nice when drama unfolds in a way where music is not required and then you feel like you're not necessarily leading; you're supporting, you're giving color and depth and tone to something, but you're not driving it."

== Track listing ==
No.	Title	Length
1.	"Consciousness"	0:34
2.	"Waltz for Alice"	3:01
3.	"Park Place"	1:18
4.	"Poison"	1:33
5.	"Southampton Water"	2:02
6.	"Wander the Ship"	0:30
7.	"Unsuspecting Man"	1:42
8.	"Bronwyn Pugh"	0:32
9.	"Bees"	1:07
10.	"Night Sky"	1:17
11.	"Hardbound"	1:25
12.	"You Always"	2:24
13.	"Let Them All Talk"	2:35
Total length:		20:00

== Reception ==
David Rooney of The Hollywood Reporter wrote "Thomas Newman's jazzy, '60s-style score supplies a teasing element that keeps you guessing about where things are headed, an aspect borne out in some unexpected swerves along the way." James Southall of Movie Wave complimented that the film score is "much more like source music than dramatic underscore, but Newman does manage to convey feelings – some ironic, some straight" and like "a little vignette showing a different side of Thomas Newman, and a very nice album" rating three out of five. Anthony Lane of The New Yorker commented that Newman's "jazz compositions are better suited to Soderbergh's narrative riffs". Brian Lowry of CNN described the score as "jaunty". Richard Lawson of Vanity Fair wrote that "Thomas Newman has written a winsome score to complement Soderbergh's pretty pictures, livening the film with a jaunty energy just as it might sink a little too far into solemnity." Pete Hammond of Deadline Hollywood wrote "Thomas Newman supplies another superb score as well." Pat Mullen of That Shelf commented "The jazzy music by Thomas Newman adds to the film's improvisational charm".

== Best Original Score disqualification ==
The Academy of Motion Picture Arts and Sciences disqualified the score to be longlisted for the Academy Award for Best Original Score at the 93rd Academy Awards, because it consisted only 40 percent of the original music in the film; only 60 percent of original compositions in the film were only eligible for qualification. This criterion was lowered to 35 percent, with the new eligibility rules being approved in June 2021, which came into effect with the 94th edition of the ceremony, the following year.
