= Let Them Talk =

Let Them Talk may refer to:

- Let Them Talk (talk show), a Russian talk show hosted by Dmitry Borisov
- Let Them Talk (Gary U.S. Bonds album) (2009)
- Let Them Talk (Hugh Laurie album) (2011)
- Let Them Talk (Marva Wright album) (2000)
- "Let Them Talk" (Little Willie John song) (1959)
- Let Them Talk (film), 1968 Argentinian film
- "Let Them Talk", a song by Harry Connick, Jr. from Oh, My NOLA

== See also ==
- "Let Them All Talk", a 1983 song by Elvis Costello and the Attractions from Punch the Clock
