= Colm Magner =

Canadian actor, writer, and director

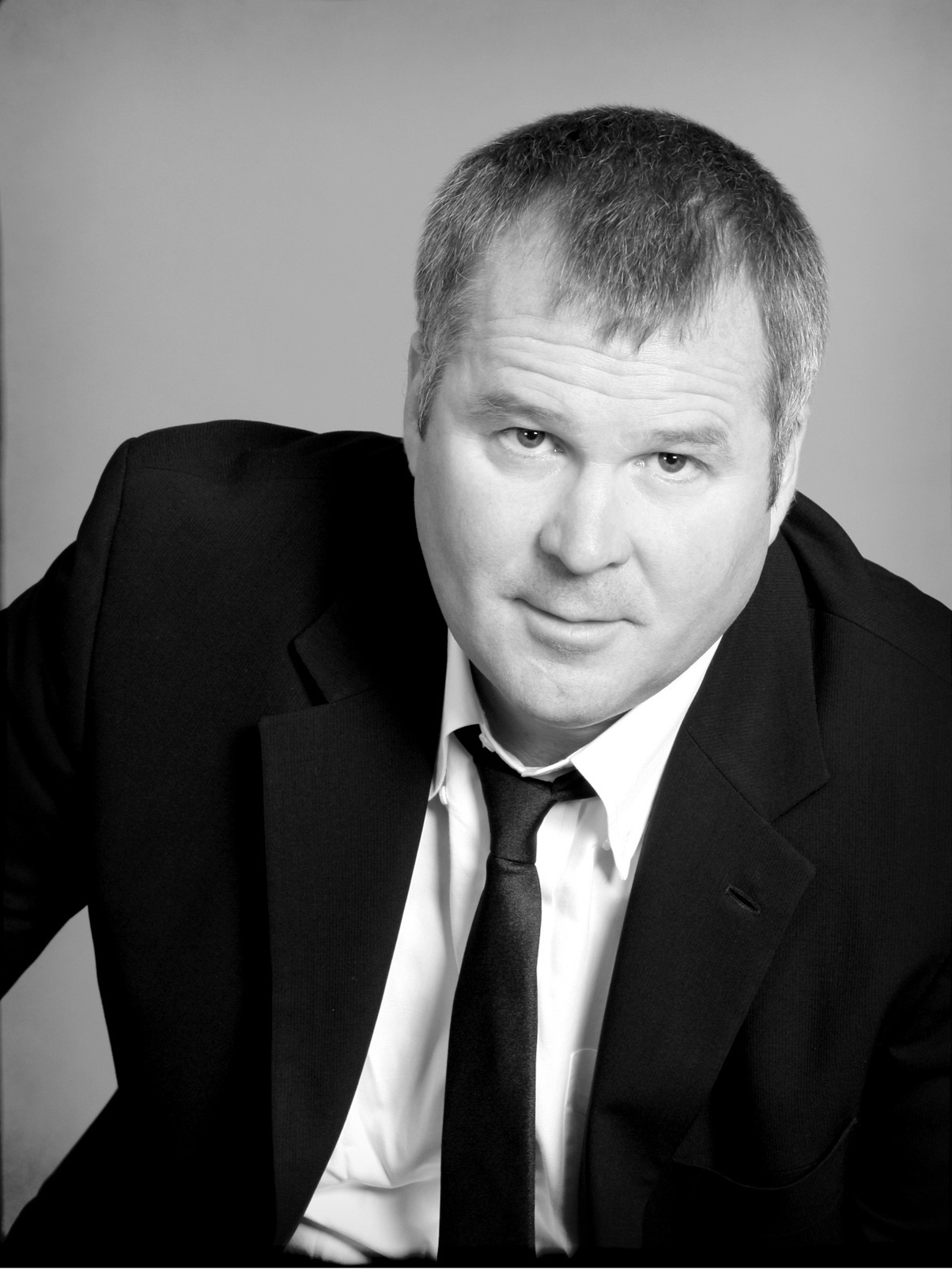
- Colm Magner in 2008
- Occupation: Actor
- Years active: 1982-2013

Colm Magner is a Canadian actor, writer, and director. He has worked in theatre, television, and film in Canada since 1982, during which time he performed with several of Canada's theatre companies.

== Career ==
Colm lived in Prince Edward Island, where he taught acting, playwriting, and academic writing at the University of Prince Edward Island. He also worked as the theatre critic for The Guardian from 2016 to 2018.

He has acted in over 30 film and television productions, including Keep the Faith Baby with Harry J. Lennix. He had recurring roles on Street Time (Showtime USA), and This Is Wonderland (CBC Canada).

He has worked as an actor at The Shaw Festival, and has written four solo plays for the stage: Smoke, Dark Avenue, Inside Imogene, and The Scavenger's Daughter which premiered at Confederation Centre in Charlottetown, Prince Edward Island.

The Scavenger's Daughter received critical acclaim when it premiered at the 4th Street Theatre in New York as part of the New York International Fringe Festival in August, 2010, and was remounted at Poor Mouth Theatre in the Bronx in December 2010. Colin Broderick, author of Orangutan and That's That has reviewed The Scavenger's Daughter.

== Filmography ==
=== Film ===
Year	Title	Role	Notes
2000	Frequency	Uniformed Cop #2	
2001	Don't Say a Word	Cop #1	
2003	Fast Food High	Garbage Man	
2004	Dawn of the Dead	Armed Neighbor	
2005	Land of the Dead	Guard at the 'Throat'	
2013	Copperhead	Bridwell	

=== Television ===
Year	Title	Role	Notes
1992	Heritage Minutes	Additional cast	Episode: "Baldwin & LaFontaine"
1995	Forever Knight	Security Guard	2 episodes
1997	Kung Fu: The Legend Continues	McReynolds	Episode: "May I Talk with You"
1997	Bad to the Bone	Guard	Television film
1997	On the 2nd Day of Christmas	Mean Guard	Television film
1998	Edison: The Wizard of Light	Man #1	Television film
1999	Relic Hunter	Bartender	Episode: "Flag Day"
2000	Code Name: Eternity	Security Guard	Episode: "Death Trap"
2000	The Other Me	Policeman	Television film
2000, 2004	Soul Food	Officer / Laurence	2 episodes
2001	Blue Murder	Inspector #2	Episode: "Steel Drums"
2001	Wild Iris	Police Officer in Car	Television film
2001	Prince Charming	Lothian Knight	Television film
2001	Exhibit A: Secrets of Forensic Science	RCMP Detective	Episode: "Blast!"
2002	Keep the Faith, Baby	Mike Quill	Television film
2002	Tru Confessions	Coach Rice	Television film
2002	Tracker	Alien #1	Episode: "What Lies Beneath"
2002	RFK	Reporter	Television film
2003	Control Factor	Daddy	Television film
2003	DC 9/11: Time of Crisis	Digging fireman	Television film
2003	Jake 2.0	NSA Security Man	Episode: "The Tech"
2003	The Wonderful World of Disney	Thomas the Maitre'd	2 episodes
2004	This Is Wonderland	Court Officer	Episode #1.1
2004	Crown Heights	Officer	Television film
2004	The Grid	Customs Guard	Miniseries
2004	Sue Thomas: F.B.Eye	Security Guard	Episode: "Skin Deep"
2004	True Crimes: The First 72 Hours	Don Hillock / Detective Carroll	2 episodes
2006	Angela's Eyes	Officer	Episode: "The Camera's Eye"
2012	Jesse Stone: Benefit of the Doubt	Hal the Doorman	Television film
