= 44th Golden Globe Awards =

Film award ceremony in 1987

- Date: January 31, 1987
- Site: Beverly Hilton Hotel, Beverly Hills, Los Angeles, California
- Hosted by: Cheryl Ladd; William Shatner

Highlights
- Best Film: Drama: Platoon
- Best Film: Musical or Comedy: Hannah and Her Sisters
- Best Drama Series: L.A. Law
- Best Musical or Comedy Series: The Golden Girls
- Most awards: (3) Platoon
- Most nominations: (5) Hannah and Her Sisters; The Mission

The 44th Golden Globe Awards, honoring the best in film and television for 1986, were held on January 31, 1987 at the Beverly Hilton.

== Winners and nominees ==
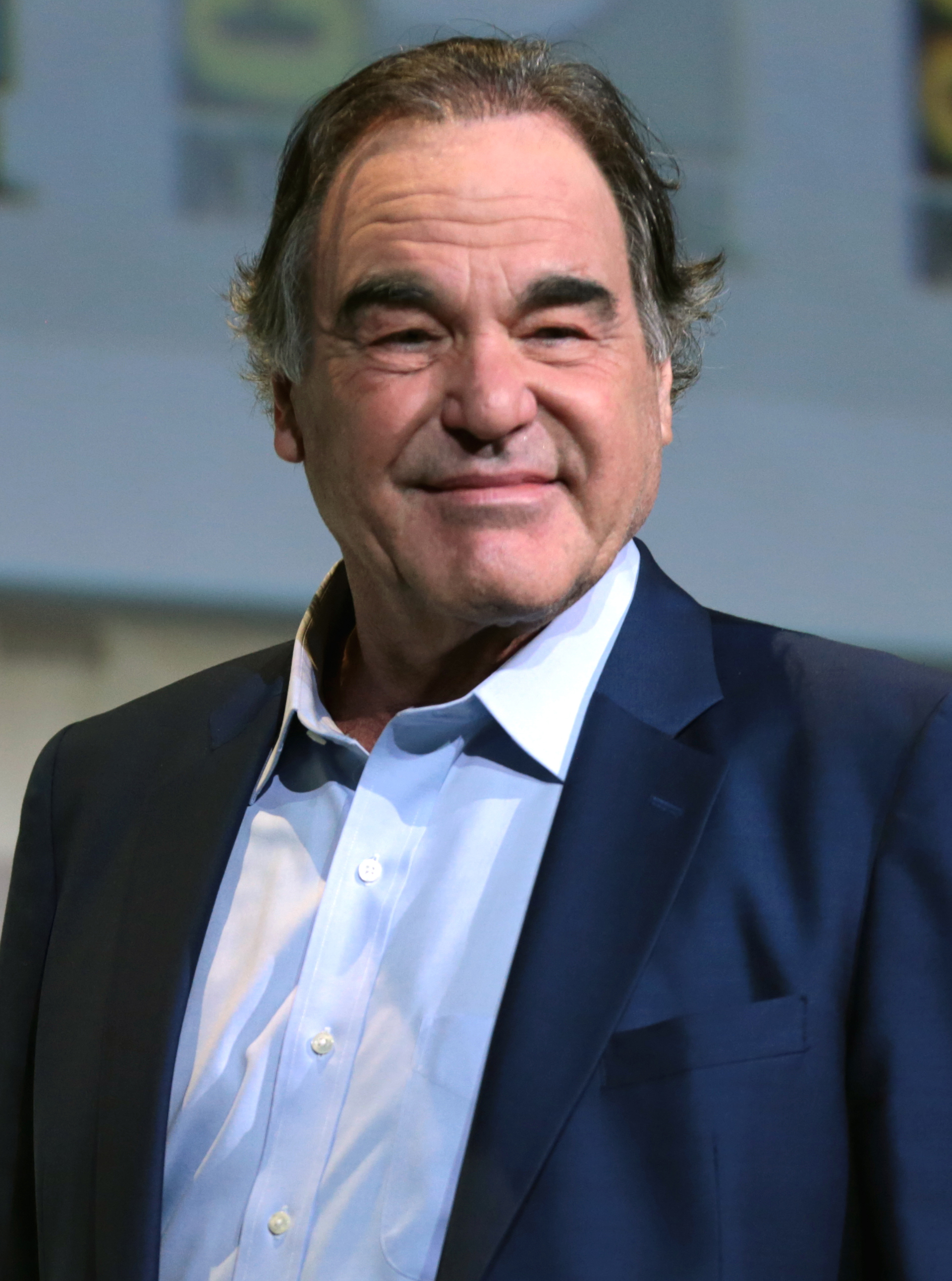
Oliver Stone — Best Director, winner

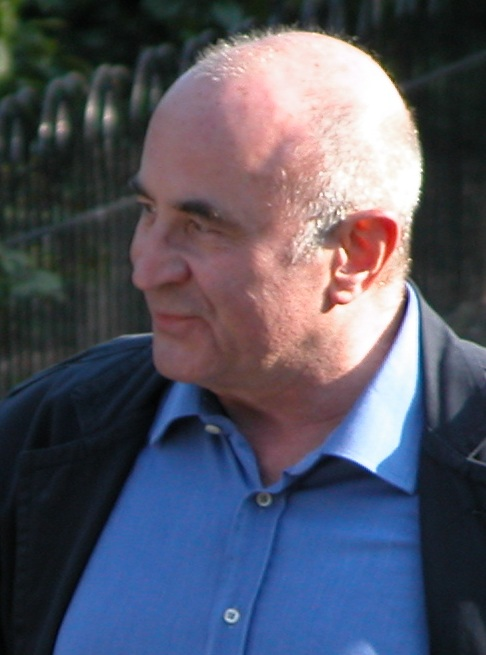
Bob Hoskins — Best Actor in a Motion Picture, Drama winner

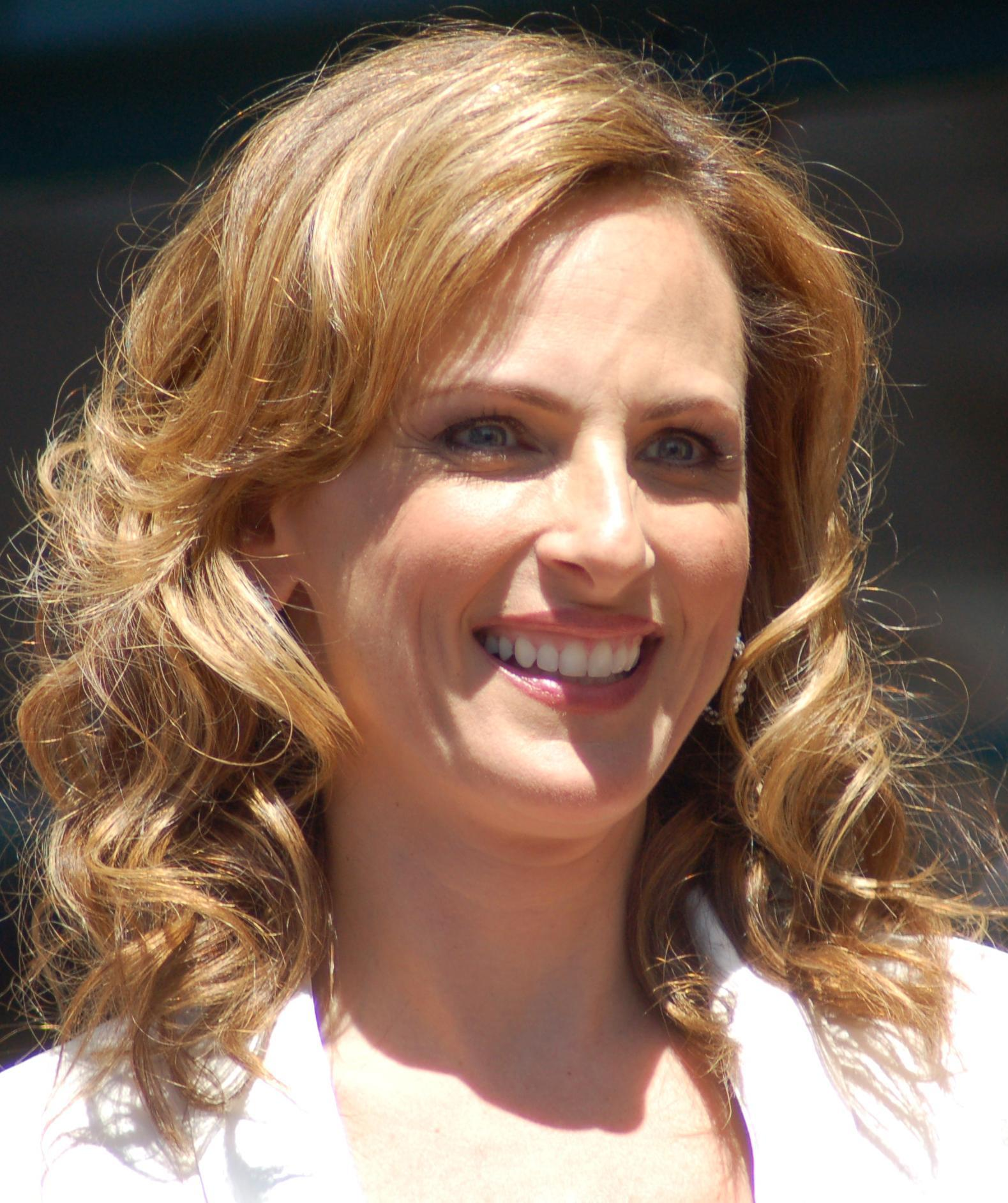
Marlee Matlin — Best Actress in a Motion Picture, Drama winner

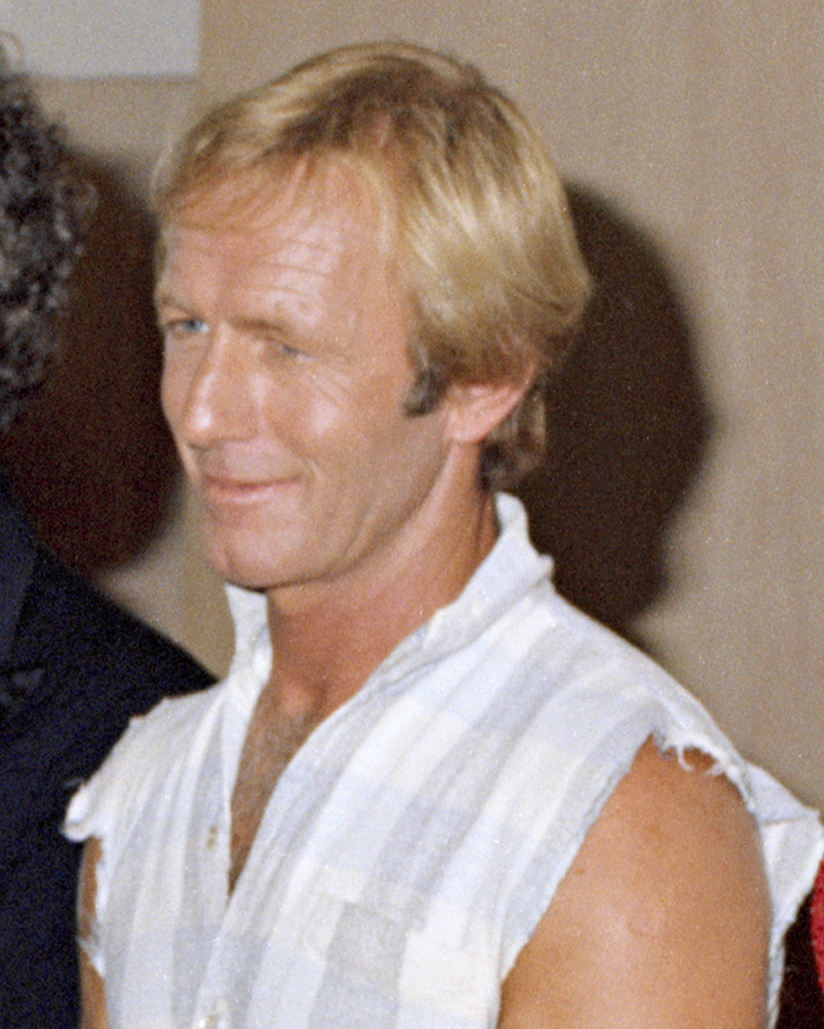
Paul Hogan — Best Actor in a Motion Picture, Comedy or Musical winner

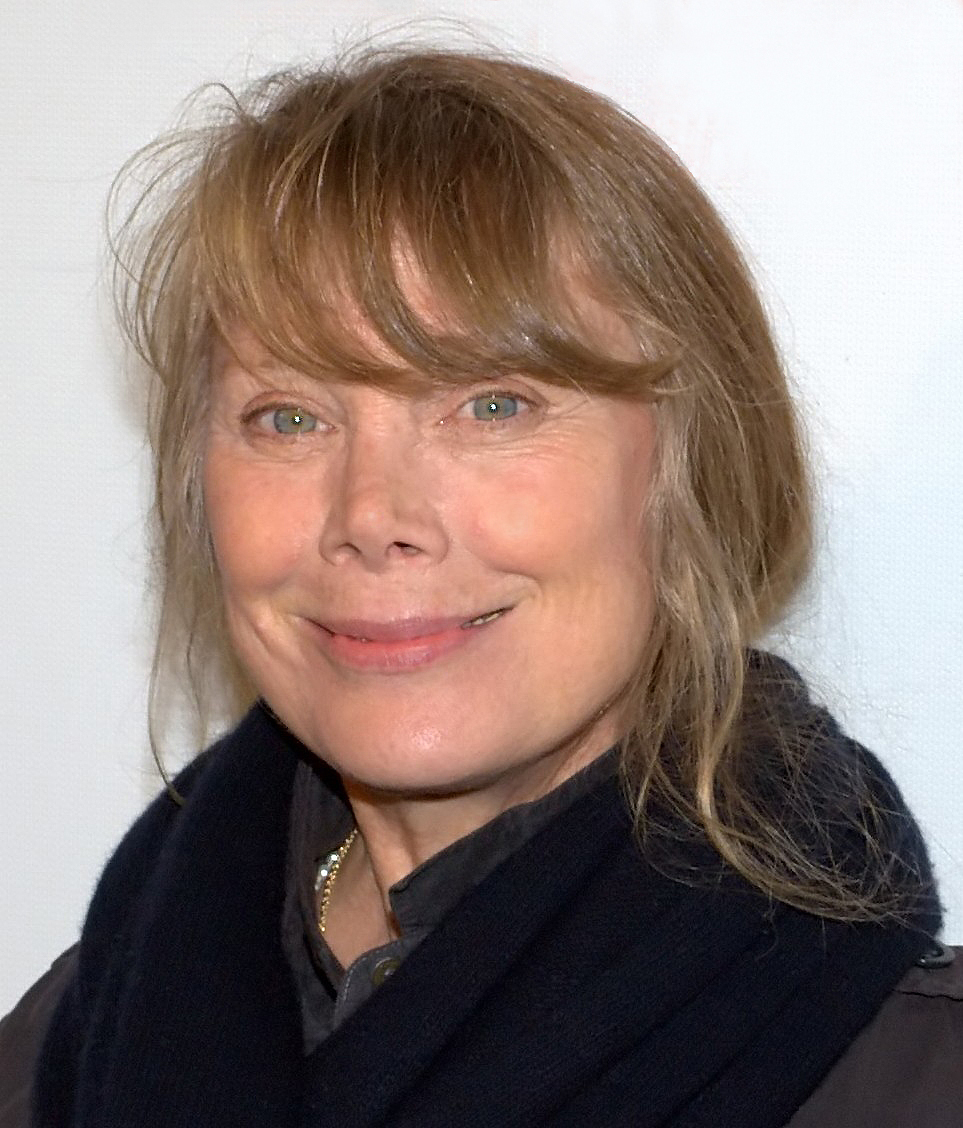
Sissy Spacek — Best Actress in a Motion Picture, Comedy or Musical winner

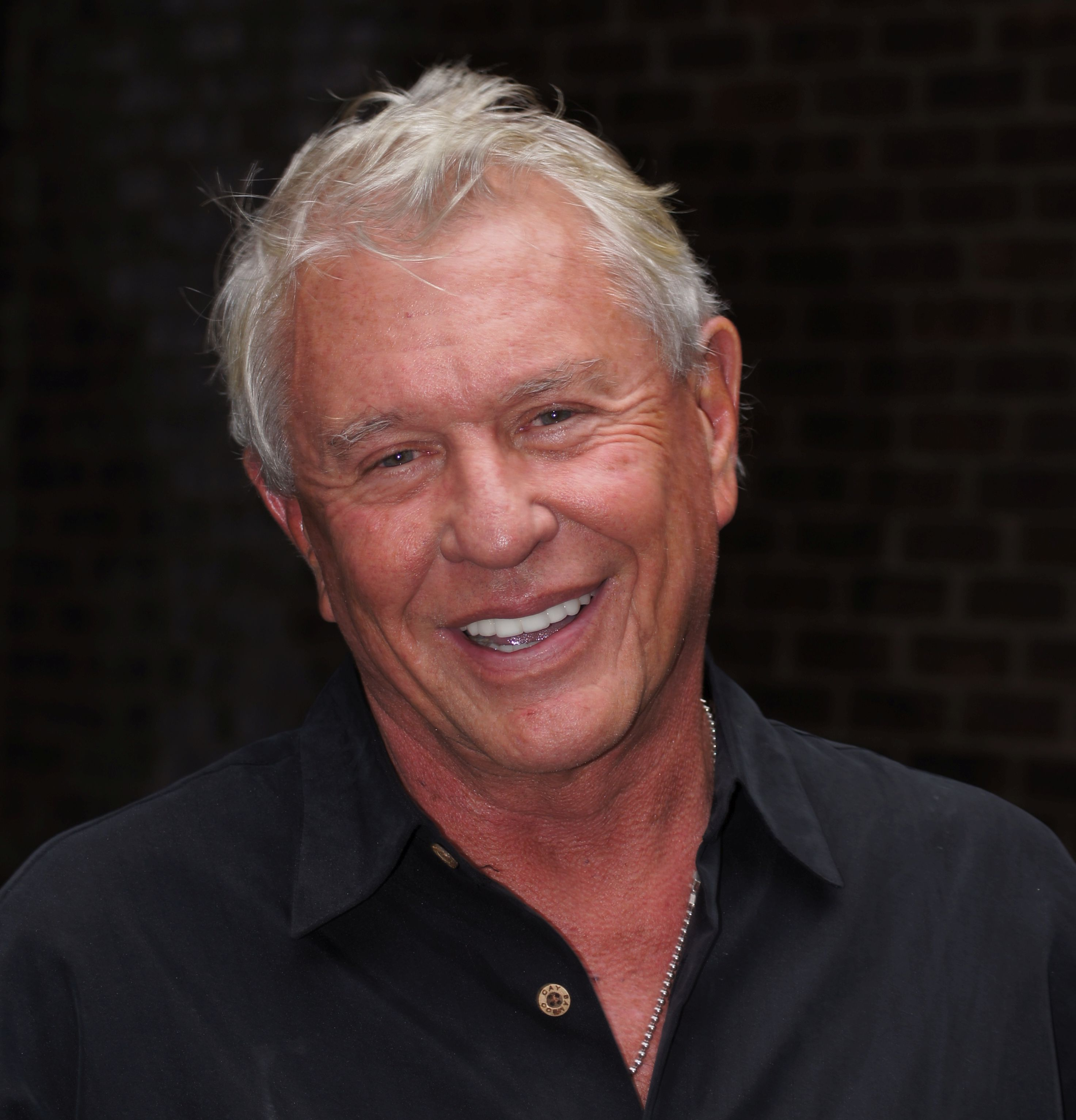
Tom Berenger — Best Supporting Actor in a Motion Picture, Drama, Comedy or Musical winner

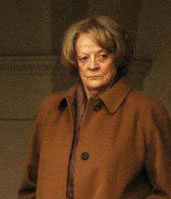
Maggie Smith — Best Supporting Actress in a Motion Picture, Drama, Comedy or Musical winner

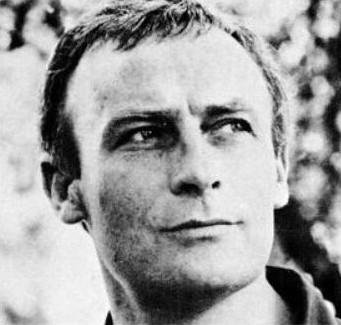
Edward Woodward — Best Actor in a Television Series, Drama winner

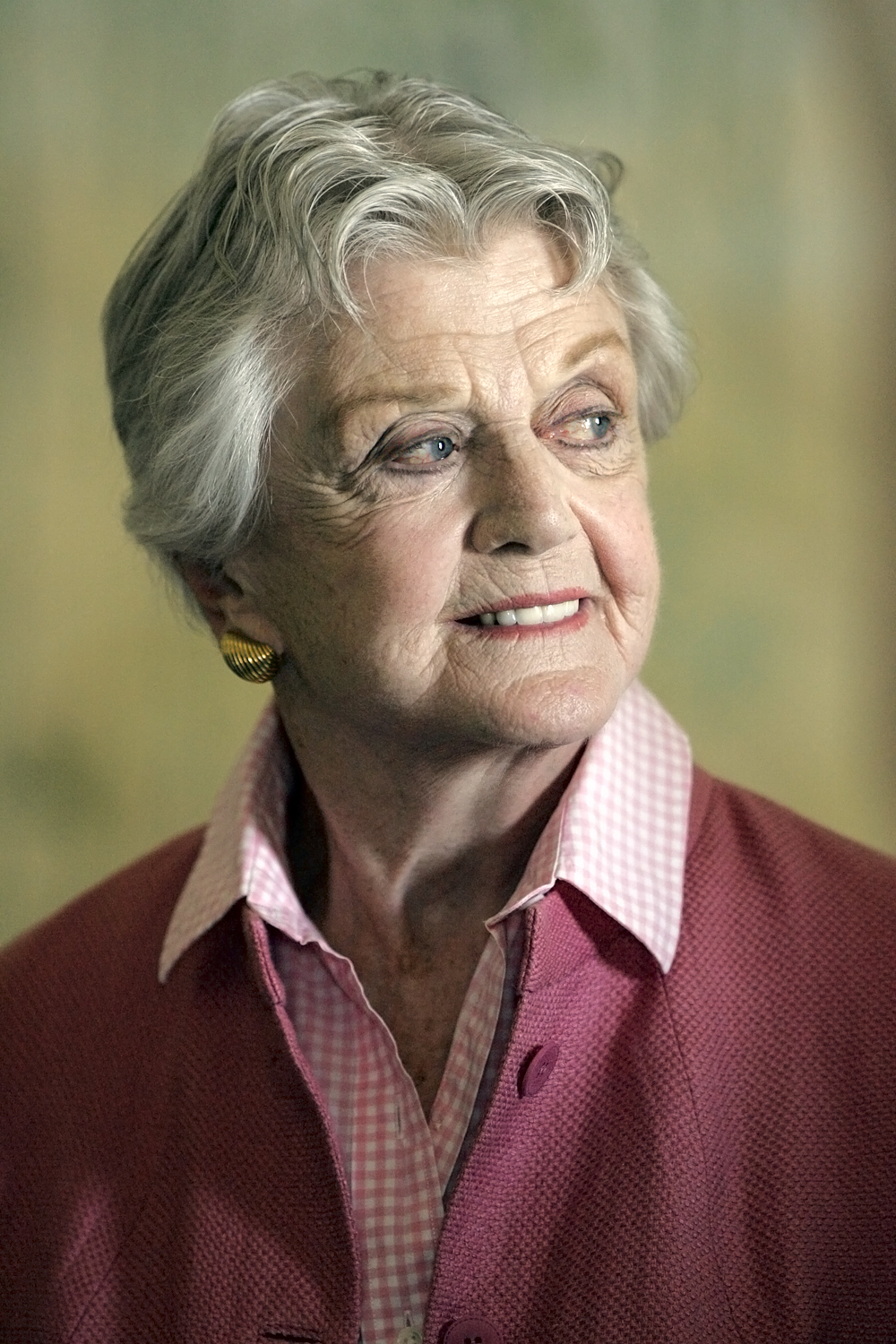
Angela Lansbury — Best Actress in a Television Series, Drama winner

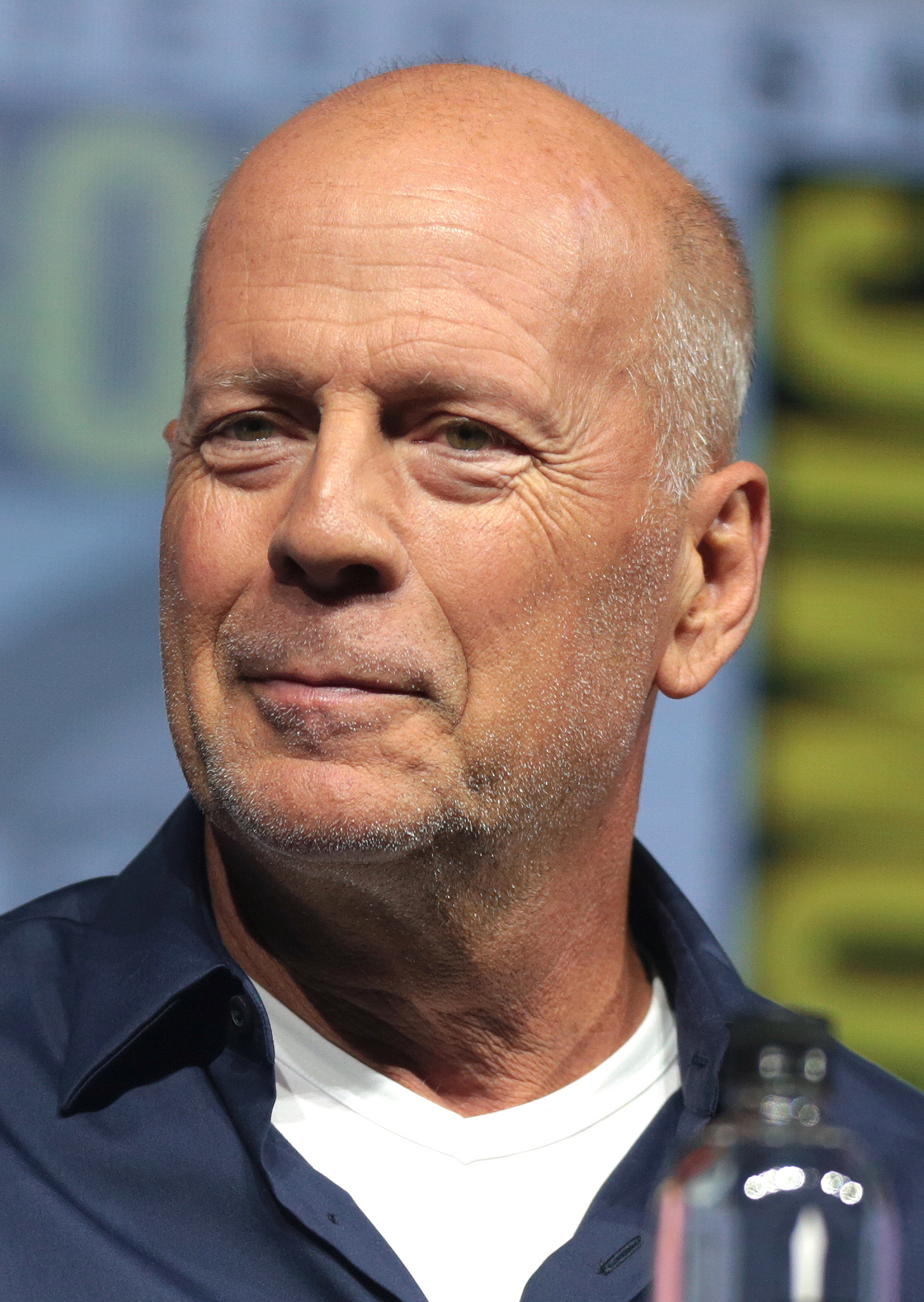
Bruce Willis — Best Actor in a Television Series, Comedy or Musical winner

Cybill Shepherd — Best Actress in a Television Series, Comedy or Musical winner

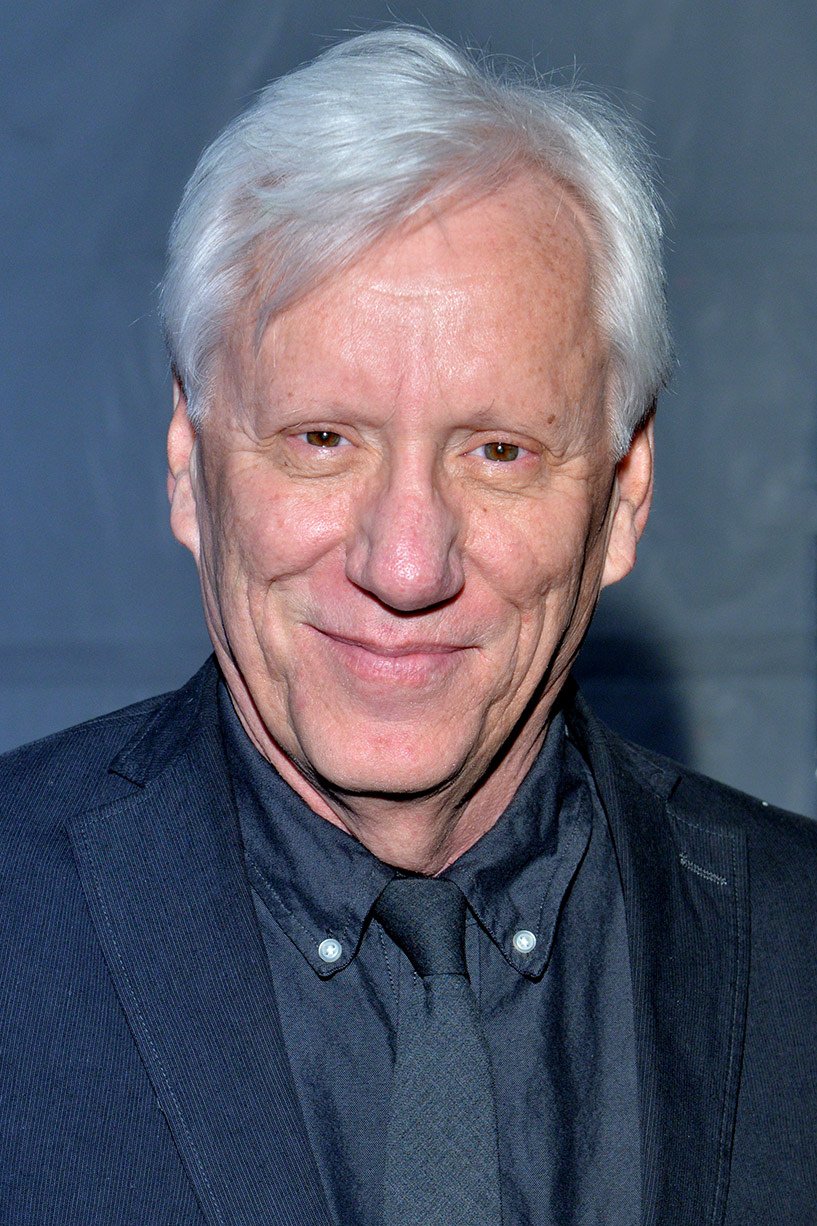
James Woods — Best Actor in a Miniseries or Television Film, winner

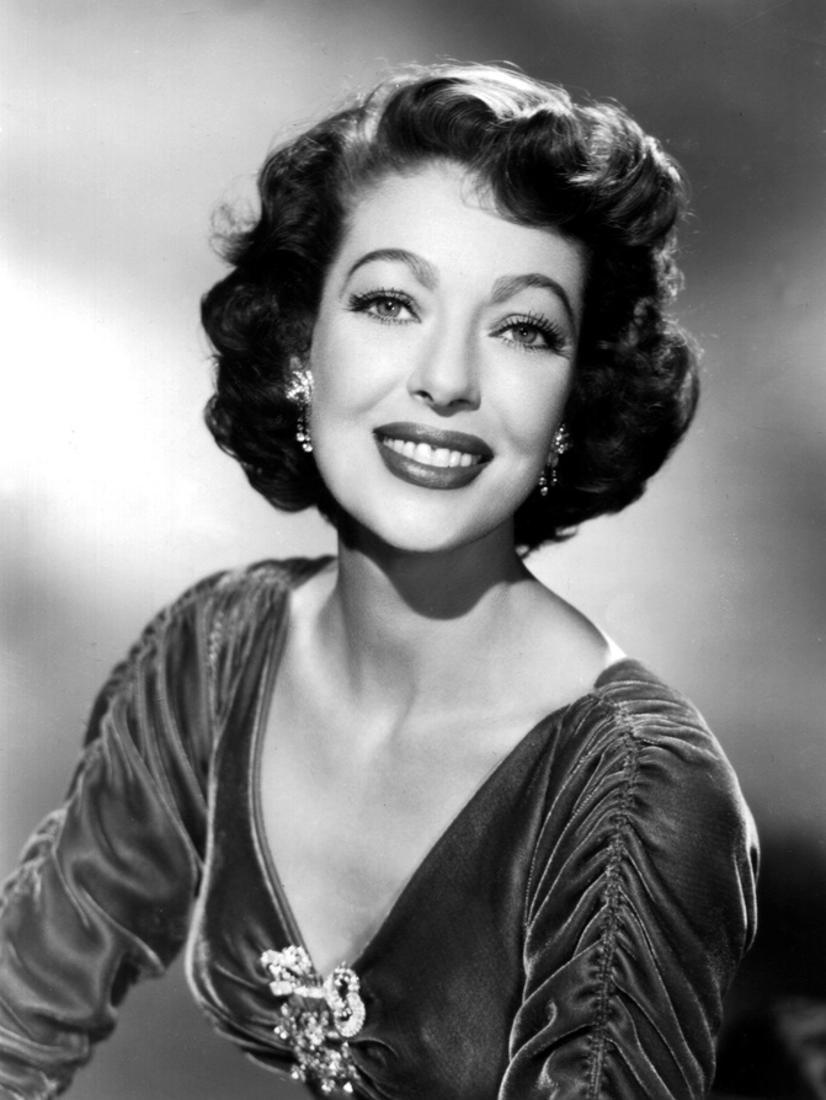
Loretta Young — Best Actress in a Miniseries or Television Film, winner

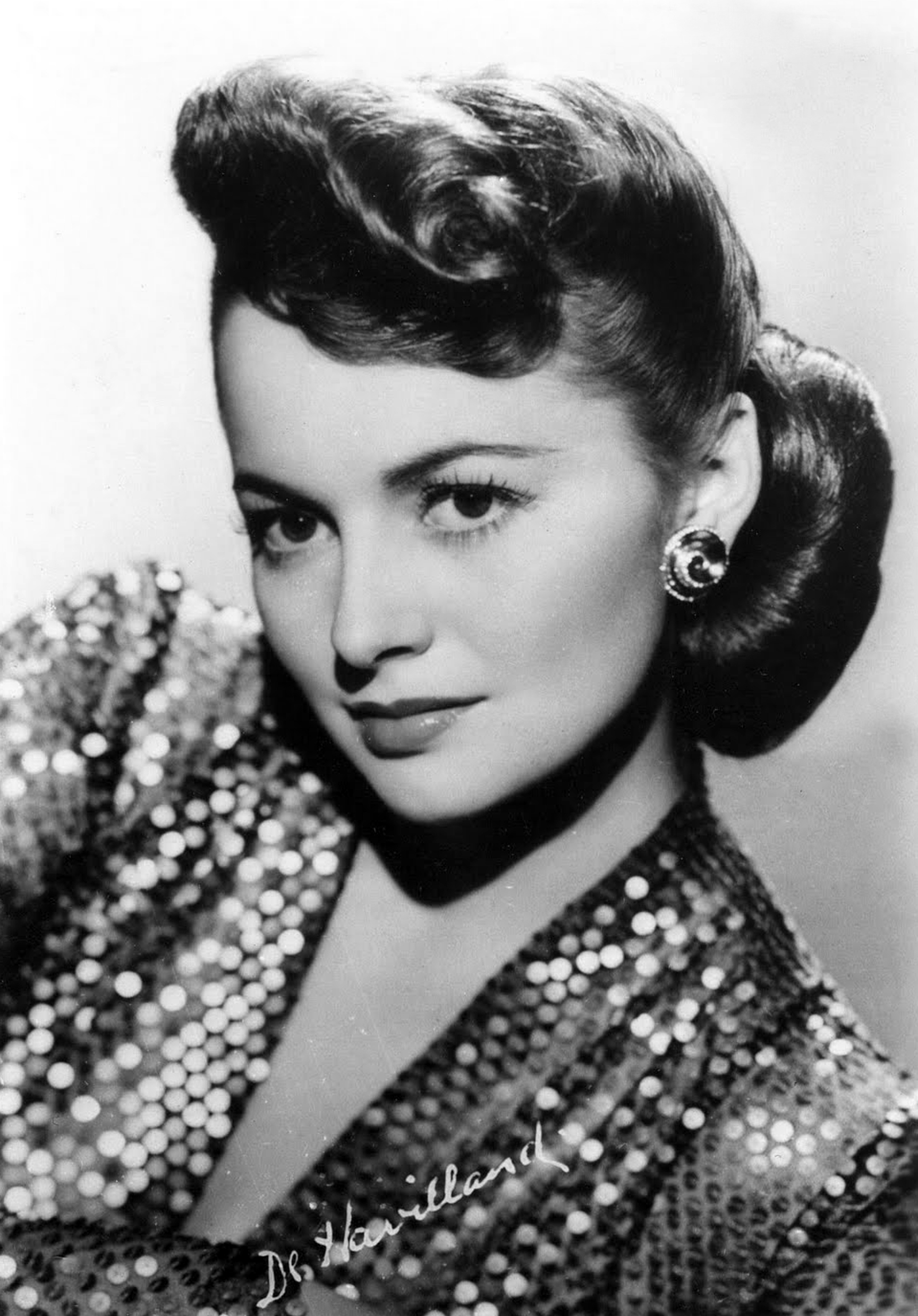
Olivia de Havilland — Best Supporting Actress in a Series, Miniseries or Motion Picture Made for Television, winner

=== Film ===
Best Motion Picture
Drama	Musical or Comedy
Platoon; Children of a Lesser God; The Mission; Mona Lisa; A Room with a View; Stand by Me	Hannah and Her Sisters; Crimes of the Heart; Crocodile Dundee; Down and Out in Beverly Hills; Little Shop of Horrors; Peggy Sue Got Married
Best Performance in a Motion Picture – Drama
Actor	Actress
Bob Hoskins – Mona Lisa as George; Harrison Ford – The Mosquito Coast as Allie Fox; Dexter Gordon – Round Midnight as Dale Turner; William Hurt – Children of a Lesser God as James Leeds; Jeremy Irons – The Mission as Father Gabriel; Paul Newman – The Color of Money as Fast Eddie Felson	Marlee Matlin – Children of a Lesser God as Sarah Norman; Julie Andrews – Duet for One as Stephanie Anderson; Anne Bancroft – 'night, Mother as Thelma Cates; Farrah Fawcett – Extremities as Marjorie; Sigourney Weaver – Aliens as Ellen Ripley
Best Performance in a Motion Picture – Comedy or Musical
Actor	Actress
Paul Hogan – Crocodile Dundee as Michael "Crocodile" Dundee; Matthew Broderick – Ferris Bueller's Day Off as Ferris Bueller; Jeff Daniels – Something Wild as Charles Driggs; Danny DeVito – Ruthless People as Sam Stone; Jack Lemmon – That's Life! as Harvey Fairchild	Sissy Spacek – Crimes of the Heart as Babe Botrelle / Rebecca MaGrath; Julie Andrews – That's Life! as Gillian Fairchild; Melanie Griffith – Something Wild as Audrey Hankel / Lulu; Bette Midler – Down and Out in Beverly Hills as Barbara Whiteman; Kathleen Turner – Peggy Sue Got Married as Peggy Sue Kelcher-Bodell
Best Supporting Performance in a Motion Picture – Drama, Comedy or Musical
Supporting Actor	Supporting Actress
Tom Berenger – Platoon as Staff Sergeant Bob Barnes; Michael Caine – Hannah and Her Sisters as Elliot; Dennis Hopper – Blue Velvet as Frank Booth; Dennis Hopper – Hoosiers as Shooter Flatch; Ray Liotta – Something Wild as Ray Sinclair	Maggie Smith – A Room with a View as Charlotte Bartlett; Linda Kozlowski – Crocodile Dundee as Sue Charlton; Mary Elizabeth Mastrantonio – The Color of Money as Carmen; Cathy Tyson – Mona Lisa as Simone; Dianne Wiest – Hannah and Her Sisters as Holly
Other
Best Director	Best Screenplay
Oliver Stone – Platoon; Woody Allen – Hannah and Her Sisters; James Ivory – A Room with a View; Roland Joffé – The Mission; Rob Reiner – Stand by Me	The Mission – Robert Bolt; Blue Velvet – David Lynch; Hannah and Her Sisters – Woody Allen; Mona Lisa – Neil Jordan and David Leland; Platoon – Oliver Stone
Best Original Score	Best Original Song
The Mission – Ennio Morricone; Little Shop of Horrors – Miles Goodman; The Mosquito Coast – Maurice Jarre; Round Midnight – Herbie Hancock; Top Gun – Harold Faltermeyer	"Take My Breath Away" (Giorgio Moroder and Tom Whitlock) – Top Gun; "Glory of Love" (Peter Cetera and David Foster) – The Karate Kid Part II; "Life in a Looking Glass" (Henry Mancini and Leslie Bricusse) – That's Life!; "Somewhere Out There" (James Horner, Barry Mann and Cynthia Weil) – An American Tail; "Sweet Freedom" (Rod Temperton) – Running Scared; "They Don't Make Them Like They Used To" (Burt Bacharach and Carole Bayer Sager) – Tough Guys
Best Foreign Language Film
The Assault (De aanslag) (Netherlands); 37.2 Degrees in the Morning (37°2 le matin) (France); Ginger and Fred (Ginger e Fred) (Italy); Otello (Italy); Three Men and a Cradle (3 hommes et un couffin) (France)

The following films received multiple nominations:

Nominations	Title
5	Hannah and Her Sisters
5	The Mission
4	Mona Lisa
4	Platoon
3	Children of a Lesser God
3	Crocodile Dundee
3	A Room with a View
3	Something Wild
3	That's Life!
2	Blue Velvet
2	The Color of Money
2	Crimes of the Heart
2	Down and Out in Beverly Hills
2	Little Shop of Horrors
2	The Mosquito Coast
2	Peggy Sue Got Married
2	Round Midnight
2	Stand by Me
2	Top Gun

The following films received multiple wins:

Wins	Title
3	Platoon
2	The Mission

=== Television ===
Best Television Series
Drama	Comedy or Musical
L.A. Law; Cagney & Lacey; Dynasty; Miami Vice; Murder, She Wrote; St. Elsewhere	The Golden Girls; Cheers; The Cosby Show; Family Ties; Moonlighting
Best Performance in a Television Series – Drama
Actor	Actress
Edward Woodward – The Equalizer as Robert McCall; William Devane – Knots Landing as Greg Sumner; John Forsythe – Dynasty as Blake Carrington; Don Johnson – Miami Vice as Sonny Crockett; Tom Selleck – Magnum, P.I. as Thomas Magnum	Angela Lansbury – Murder, She Wrote as Jessica Fletcher; Joan Collins – Dynasty as Alexis Carrington; Tyne Daly – Cagney & Lacey as Mary Beth Lacey; Sharon Gless – Cagney & Lacey as Christine Cagney; Connie Sellecca – Hotel as Christine Francis
Best Performance in a Television Series – Comedy or Musical
Actor	Actress
Bruce Willis – Moonlighting as David Addison; Bill Cosby – The Cosby Show as Cliff Huxtable; Ted Danson – Cheers as Sam Malone; Tony Danza – Who's the Boss? as Tony Micelli; Michael J. Fox – Family Ties as Alex P. Keaton	Cybill Shepherd – Moonlighting as Maddie Hayes; Beatrice Arthur – The Golden Girls as Dorothy Zbornak; Estelle Getty – The Golden Girls as Sophia Petrillo; Rue McClanahan – The Golden Girls as Blanche Devereaux; Betty White – The Golden Girls as Rose Nylund
Best Performance in a Miniseries or Television Film
Actor	Actress
James Woods – Promise as D.J.; James Garner – Promise as Bob Buehler; Mark Harmon – The Deliberate Stranger as Ted Bundy; Jan Niklas – Peter the Great as Peter the Great; John Ritter – Unnatural Causes as Frank Coleman	Loretta Young – Christmas Eve as Amanda Kingsley; Farrah Fawcett – Nazi Hunter: The Beate Klarsfeld Story as Beate Klarsfeld; Amy Irving – Anastasia: The Mystery of Anna as Anastasia "Anna" Anderson; Vanessa Redgrave – Second Serve as Renée Richards; Marlo Thomas – Nobody's Child as Marie Balter
Best Supporting Performance - TV Series, Miniseries or Television Film
Supporting Actor	Supporting Actress
Jan Niklas – Anastasia: The Mystery of Anna as Prince Erich; Tom Conti – Nazi Hunter: The Beate Klarsfeld Story as Serge Klarsfeld; John Hillerman – Magnum, P.I. as Jonathan Higgins; Trevor Howard – Christmas Eve as Maitland; Ron Leibman – Christmas Eve as Morris Huffner	Olivia de Havilland – Anastasia: The Mystery of Anna as Dowager Empress Maria; Justine Bateman – Family Ties as Mallory Keaton; Piper Laurie – Promise as Annie Gilbert; Lilli Palmer – Peter the Great as Tsarina Natalya; Geraldine Page – Nazi Hunter: The Beate Klarsfeld Story as Itta Halaunbrenner; Rhea Perlman – Cheers as Carla Tortelli
Best Miniseries or Television Film
Promise; Anastasia: The Mystery of Anna; Christmas Eve; Nobody's Child; Peter the Great; Unnatural Causes

The following programs received multiple nominations:

Nominations	Title
5	The Golden Girls
4	Anastasia: The Mystery of Anna
4	Christmas Eve
4	Promise
3	Cagney & Lacey
3	Cheers
3	Dynasty
3	Family Ties
3	Moonlighting
3	Nazi Hunter: The Beate Klarsfeld Story
3	Peter the Great
2	The Cosby Show
2	Magnum P.I.
2	Miami Vice
2	Murder, She Wrote
2	Nobody's Child
2	Unnatural Causes

The following programs received multiple wins:

Wins	Title
2	Anastasia: The Mystery of Anna
2	Moonlighting
2	Promise

== Ceremony ==
=== Presenters ===
- David Anspaugh
- Stephanie Beacham
- Heidi Bohay
- Bruce Boxleitner
- James Brolin
- Diahann Carroll
- Tony Curtis
- John Daly
- Olivia de Havilland
- Rebecca De Mornay
- Carter DeHaven
- Derek Gibson
- Whoopi Goldberg
- Steve Guttenberg
- George Hamilton
- Charlton Heston
- Dennis Hopper
- Stacy Keach
- John Larroquette
- Heather Locklear
- Melissa Manchester
- Marsha Mason
- Bill Medley
- Donna Mills
- Melba Moore
- Pat Morita
- Gary Morris
- Angelo Pizzo
- Tom Selleck
- Jane Seymour
- Jaclyn Smith
- Toni Tennille
- Joan Van Ark
- Jon Voight
- Robert Wagner
- Lesley Ann Warren

=== Cecil B. DeMille Award ===
Anthony Quinn

== Awards breakdown ==
The following networks received multiple nominations:

Nominations	Network
30	NBC
11	ABC
10	CBS
4	Hallmark

The following networks received multiple wins:

Wins	Network
2	NBC
2	ABC
2	Hallmark

== See also ==
- 59th Academy Awards
- 7th Golden Raspberry Awards
- 38th Primetime Emmy Awards
- 39th Primetime Emmy Awards
- 40th British Academy Film Awards
- 41st Tony Awards
- 1986 in film
- 1986 in American television
