= 21 Hours at Munich =

1976 television film by William A. Graham

- Genre: Historical drama
- Based on: The Blood of Israel by Serge Groussard
- Screenplay by: Edward Hume; Howard Fast
- Directed by: William A. Graham
- Starring: William Holden; Shirley Knight; Franco Nero; Anthony Quayle; Richard Basehart
- Music by: Laurence Rosenthal
- Country of origin: United States
- Original language: English

Production
- Executive producer: Edward S. Feldman
- Producers: Robert Greenwald; Frank von Zerneck
- Cinematography: Jost Vacano
- Editor: Ronald J. Fagan
- Running time: 101 minutes
- Production companies: Moonlight Productions; Filmways Television

Original release
- Network: ABC
- Release: November 7, 1976

21 Hours at Munich is a 1976 American historical drama television film directed by William A. Graham and starring William Holden, Shirley Knight and Franco Nero. It is based on the 1975 non-fiction book The Blood of Israel by Serge Groussard, and it deals with real events concerning the Munich massacre during the 1972 Summer Olympics. It was broadcast by ABC November 7, 1976. Despite its television origin, the film was released theatrically in several foreign countries. It was nominated for Outstanding Television Movie and Outstanding Picture Editing for a Television Movie at the 29th Primetime Emmys.

== Plot ==
A dramatization of the incident at the 1972 Summer Olympics when Arab terrorists broke into the Olympic compound in Munich and murdered 11 Israeli athletes.

== Cast ==
- William Holden as Chief of Police Manfred Schreiber
- Shirley Knight as Anneliese Graes
- Franco Nero as Lutif "Issa" Afif
- Anthony Quayle as General Zvi Zamir
- Richard Basehart as Chancellor Willy Brandt
- Noel Willman as Interior Minister Bruno Merk
- Georg Marischka as Hans-Dietrich Genscher
- Else Quecke as Golda Meir
- Michael Degen as Mohammed Khadif
- Djamchid Socheili as Touny
- Walter Kohut as Feldhaus
- Jan Niklas as Schreiber's Aide
- Ernest Lenart as Ben Horin
- Osman Raghab as Prime Minister Aziz Sedky
- James Hurley as Avery Brundage
- Franz Rudnick as Troger
- Heinz Feldhaus as Brandt's Aide
- Martin Gilet as Moshe Weinberger
- Paul L. Smith as Yossef Gutfreund
- Günther Maria Halmer as Andre Spitzer
- David Hess as David Berger
- Erik Falk as Yossef Romano
- Bernhard Melcer as Mark Slavin
- Herbert Fux as Kehat Shorr
- Epamonodas Sdukos as Amitzur Shapira
- Wilfried von Aacken as Yakov Springer
- Abraham Gabison as Eliezer Halfin
- Ullrich Haupt as Israeli Coach
- Dan van Husen as Tony Nazzal
- Achim Geisler as Abu Halla
- Reto Feurer as Khalid "Salah" Jawad
- Julio Pinheiro as Afif Ahmed "Paulo" Hamid
- Franz Gunther Heider as Samir
- Sammy Kazian as Denawi
- Carmelo Ceslo as Badran

== See also ==
- List of American films of 1976
