= Shirley Knight =

American actress (1936–2020)

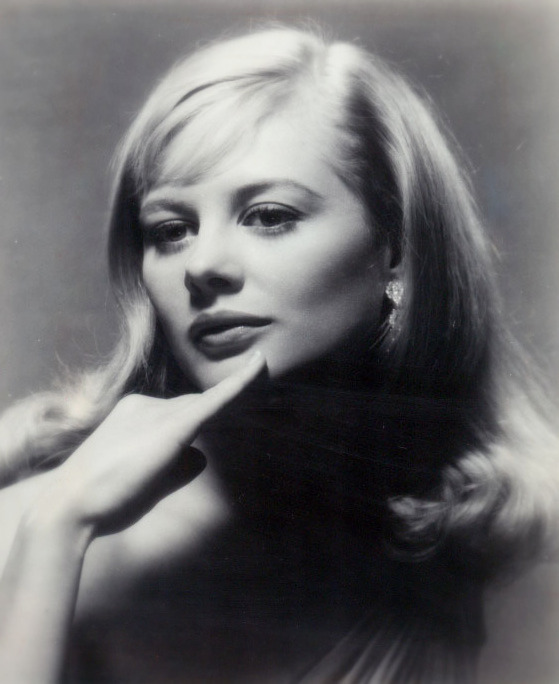
- Knight in 1963
- Born: Shirley Enola Knight; July 5, 1936; Goessel, Kansas, U.S.
- Died: April 22, 2020 (aged 83); San Marcos, Texas, U.S.
- Education: Phillips University; Wichita State University; HB Studio
- Occupation: Actress
- Years active: 1955–2018
- Spouses: Gene Persson (m. 1959; div. 1969) John Hopkins (m. 1969; died 1998)
- Children: 2, including Kaitlin Hopkins
- Awards: See below

Shirley Enola Knight Hopkins (née Knight; July 5, 1936 – April 22, 2020) was an American actress, active in theatre, film, and television from the 1960s through the 2010s. She was a two-time Oscar nominee, a three-time Primetime Emmy Award winner, and a Golden Globe and Tony Award winner, among other accolades.

She was nominated twice for the Academy Award for Best Supporting Actress: for The Dark at the Top of the Stairs (1960) and Sweet Bird of Youth (1962). In the 1960s, she had leading roles in a number of Hollywood films such as The Couch (1962), House of Women (1962), The Group (1966), The Counterfeit Killer (1968), and The Rain People (1969). She received the Volpi Cup for Best Actress for her role in the British film Dutchman (1966).

In 1976, Knight won a Tony Award for Best Featured Actress in a Play for her performance in Kennedy's Children, a play by Robert Patrick. In later years, she played supporting roles in many films, including Endless Love (1981), As Good as It Gets (1997), Divine Secrets of the Ya-Ya Sisterhood (2002), and Grandma's Boy (2006).

== Early life and education ==
Knight was born in Goessel, Kansas, the daughter of Virginia (née Webster; 1916-1977) and Noel Johnson Knight (1913-1985), an oil company executive. She had a brother and a sister. She spent her young life in Mitchell, Kansas, and later lived in Lyons, Kansas, where she graduated from high school. She began studying to be an opera singer at age 11.

At the age of 14, she wrote a short story that was published in a national magazine. Knight later attended Phillips University and Wichita State University. After studying at the Pasadena Theatre School, she began her film career in 1959. She then went to New York and began her theatre career. She trained in acting with Jeff Corey, Erwin Piscator, Lee Strasberg, and Uta Hagen at HB Studio.

== Career ==
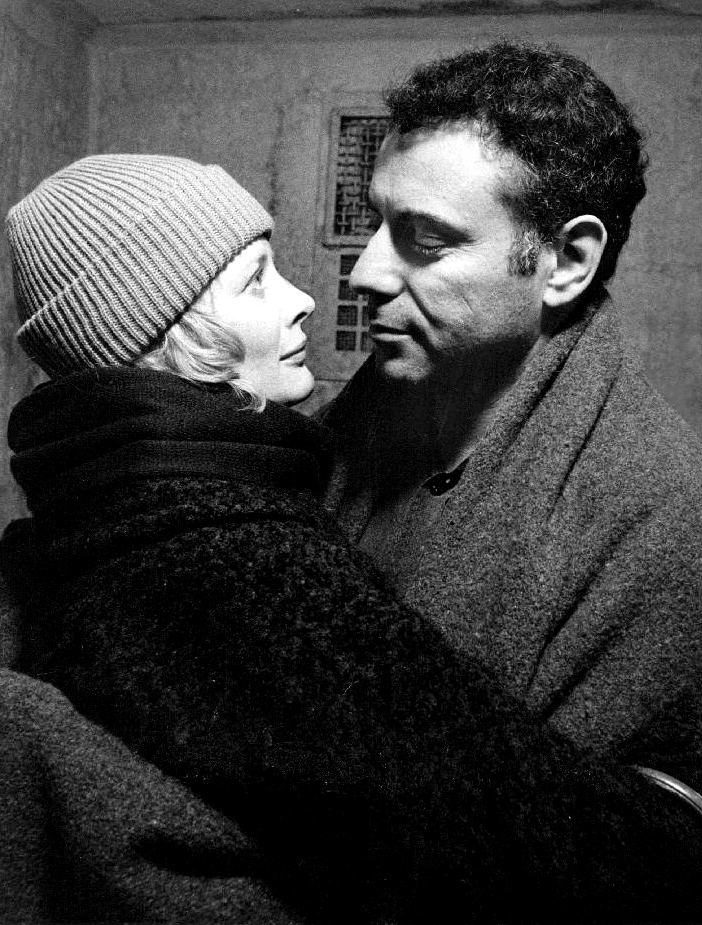
Knight with Alan Arkin in The Defection of Simas Kudirka (1978)

Knight's feature films include The Group (1966), The Dutchman (1967), Petulia (1968), The Rain People (1969), Secrets (1971), Juggernaut (1974), Beyond the Poseidon Adventure (1979), Endless Love (1981), Angel Eyes (2001), Divine Secrets of the Ya-Ya Sisterhood (2002), Paul Blart: Mall Cop (2009), Our Idiot Brother (2011) and Elevator (2011), in which she plays one of several people trapped in a Wall Street elevator with a bomber.

Knight was cast in 1958 and 1959 as Mrs. Newcomb in 20 of the 29 episodes of the television series Buckskin, with Tom Nolan, Sally Brophy, and Mike Road. She became a Warner Brothers Television contract star who while on breaks from filming feature films appeared in television series such as Maverick, Bourbon Street Beat, Sugarfoot, Cheyenne, and The Roaring 20s.

A life member of The Actors Studio, Knight's stage credits include Three Sisters (1964), We Have Always Lived in the Castle (1966), Kennedy's Children (1975), which earned her the Tony Award for Best Performance by a Featured Actress in a Play, and A Lovely Sunday for Creve Coeur (1979). Knight also performed the lead role in the Chelsea Theater Center production of the Brecht/Weill musical Happy End in March 1977; when a modified version of the production transferred to Broadway the next month, Knight was replaced with Meryl Streep.

She was nominated for the Drama Desk Award for Outstanding Actress in a Play twice, for Landscape of the Body and The Young Man from Atlanta, for which she received another Tony nomination. She also appeared in Come Back, Come Back, Wherever You Are (2009), an original play by Arthur Laurents.

Her television credits include Target: The Corruptors!, The Eleventh Hour, The Outer Limits ("The Man Who Was Never Born"), The Reporter, The Fugitive, The Invaders, The Virginian, Murder, She Wrote, Spenser for Hire, Thirtysomething, Law & Order, L.A. Law, Law & Order: Special Victims Unit, Maggie Winters, ER, House M.D., Crossing Jordan, Cold Case, and Hot in Cleveland, among others.

She appeared in various television films, including Playing For Time and Indictment: The McMartin Trial. For the latter, she won both the Emmy Award for Outstanding Supporting Actress in a Miniseries or a Movie and the Golden Globe Award for Best Performance by an Actress in a Supporting Role in a Series, Mini-Series or Motion Picture Made for Television. Her guest performance in thirtysomething earned her a 1988 Emmy for Best Guest Performer in a Drama Series. She won an Emmy in 1995 for her guest performance in the NYPD Blue episode "Large Mouth Bass".

She appeared in the first segment of If These Walls Could Talk. She also had a recurring role on Desperate Housewives.

== Personal life ==
Knight was married to American actor and producer Gene Persson from 1959 until their divorce in 1969. They had one child, actress Kaitlin Hopkins (born February 1, 1964).

Her second marriage was to English writer John Hopkins from 1969 until his death in 1998. They had one child, elementary school teacher Sophie C. Hopkins.

=== Death ===
One month after suffering a fall at an assisted living facility, Knight died on April 22, 2020, at age 83, at her daughter Kaitlin Hopkins's home in San Marcos, Texas.

== Filmography ==
=== Film ===
| Year | Title | Role | Notes |
|---|---|---|---|
| 1959 | Five Gates to Hell | Sister Maria | |
| 1960 | Ice Palace | Grace Kennedy | |
| 1960 | The Dark at the Top of the Stairs | Reenie Flood | |
| 1962 | The Couch | Terry Ames | |
| 1962 | Sweet Bird of Youth | Heavenly Finley | |
| 1962 | House of Women | Erica Hayden | |
| 1964 | Flight from Ashiya | Caroline Gordon | |
| 1966 | The Group | Polly Andrews Ridgeley | |
| 1966 | Dutchman | Lula | |
| 1968 | The Counterfeit Killer | Angie Peterson | |
| 1968 | Petulia | Prudence "Polo" Bollen | |
| 1969 | The Rain People | Natalie Ravenna | |
| 1971 | Secrets | Beatrice | |
| 1974 | Juggernaut | Barbara Bannister | |
| 1979 | Beyond the Poseidon Adventure | Hannah Meredith | |
| 1981 | Endless Love | Ann Butterfield | |
| 1982 | The Sender | Jerolyn | |
| 1982 | Prisoners | Virginia | |
| 1994 | Benders | Donna | |
| 1994 | Color of Night | Edith Niedelmeyer | |
| 1994 | The Secret Life of Houses | Aunt Fergie | |
| 1995 | Stuart Saves His Family | Mrs. Smalley | |
| 1996 | Diabolique | Edie Danziger | |
| 1996 | Somebody Is Waiting | Irma Cill | |
| 1997 | As Good as It Gets | Beverly Connelly | |
| 1997 | Little Boy Blue | Doris Knight | |
| 2000 | 75 Degrees in July | Jo Beth Anderson | |
| 2001 | A House on a Hill | Mercedes Mayfield | |
| 2001 | Angel Eyes | Elanora Davis | |
| 2002 | The Salton Sea | Nancy Plummer | |
| 2002 | P.S. Your Cat Is Dead | Aunt Claire | |
| 2002 | Divine Secrets of the Ya-Ya Sisterhood | Necie Rose Kelleher | |
| 2005 | Sexual Life | Joanna | |
| 2006 | Grandma's Boy | Bea | |
| 2006 | Open Window | Dr. Ann Monohan | |
| 2006 | Thanks to Gravity | Lea | |
| 2008 | The Other Side of the Tracks | Helen | |
| 2008 | Not Fade Away | Diane | |
| 2009 | Paul Blart: Mall Cop | Margaret Blart | |
| 2009 | The Private Lives of Pippa Lee | Dot Nadeau | |
| 2010 | Listen to Your Heart | Grandma Sam | |
| 2011 | Our Idiot Brother | Ilene Rochlin | |
| 2011 | The Melancholy Fantastic | Mor (voice) | |
| 2011 | Elevator | Jane Redding | |
| 2013 | Redwood Highway | Marie Vaughn | |
| 2014 | Mercy | Mercy | |
| 2015 | Paul Blart: Mall Cop 2 | Margaret Blart | |
| 2015 | The Missing Girl | Mrs. Colvins | |
| 2016 | Doll in the Dark | Mor (voice) | |
| 2018 | Periphery | Leanne Cross | |

=== Television ===
| Year | Title | Role | Notes |
|---|---|---|---|
| 1958–59 | Buckskin | Mrs. Newcomb | 20 episodes |
| 1959 | The Restless Gun | | Episode: "Better Than a Cannon" |
| 1960 | 77 Sunset Strip | Mari Ellen Taylor | Episode: "Fraternity of Fear" |
| 1961 | Lawman | | Episode: "The Trial" |
| 1961 | Maverick | Nancy Powers | Episode: "The Ice Man" |
| 1961 | The Roaring 20s | Ellie Hollis | Episode: "Big Town Blues" |
| 1962 | Naked City | Kathy Meigs | Episode: "Five Cranks for Winter... Ten Cranks for Spring" |
| 1962, 1965 | The Virginian | Susan Morrow, Clara Malone | 2 episodes |
| 1963 | The Outer Limits | Noel Anderson | Episode: "The Man Who Was Never Born" |
| 1964–66 | The Fugitive | Janice Pruitt, Mona Ross, Jane Washburn, | 3 episodes |
| 1967 | The Invaders | Margaret Cook | Episode: "The Watchers" |
| 1973 | The Streets of San Francisco | Mary Rae Dortmunter | Episode: "A Room With a View" |
| 1973 | Circle of Fear | Beth | Episode: "Legion of Demons" |
| 1973 | Orson Welles Great Mysteries | Margot Brenner | Episode: "The Power of Fear" |
| 1974 | Nakia | Faye Arnold | Episode: "Pete" |
| 1975 | Barnaby Jones | Kay Lewiston | Episode: "Fantasy of Fear" |
| 1975 | Medical Story | Phyllis Lenahan | Pilot episode |
| 1982 | Nurse | Sylvia Dennis | Episode: "Euthanasia" |
| 1982 | Tales of the Unexpected | Elizabeth Bourdon | Episode: "A Woman's Help" |
| 1984 | Hammer House of Mystery and Suspense | Ann Fairfax Denver | Episode: "The Sweet Scent of Death" |
| 1985, 1987 | Spenser: For Hire | Katie Quirk | 2 episodes |
| 1987, 1990 | Thirtysomething | Ruth Murdoch | 2 episodes |
| 1989 | Murder, She Wrote | Grace Fenton | Episode: "Smooth Operators" |
| 1989 | The Equalizer | Kay | Episode: "Time Present, Time Past" |
| 1990 | Murder, She Wrote | Grace Lambert | Episode: "Always a Thief" |
| 1990 | Matlock | Phyllis Todd | Episode: "The Mother" |
| 1991 | Law & Order | Melanie Cullen | Episode: "The Wages of Love" |
| 1993 | L.A. Law | Belinda Collins | Episode: "Hello and Goodbye" |
| 1993 | Angel Falls | Edie Wren Cox | Television series |
| 1995 | Fudge | Mrs. A | Episode: "Fudge-a-mania" |
| 1995 | NYPD Blue | Agnes Cantwell | Episode: "Large Mouth Bass" |
| 1996 | Cybill | Loretta | Episode: "Romancing the Crone" |
| 1998–99 | Maggie Winters | Estelle Winters | 16 episodes |
| 1998 | Significant Others | Mrs. Callaway | 2 episodes |
| 2001 | The Fugitive | Delores Dalkowski | Episode: "Past Perfect" |
| 2001 | Law & Order: Special Victims Unit | Dr. Wharton | Episode: "Repression" |
| 2002 | Ally McBeal | Helen Apple | Episode: "Homecoming" |
| 2002 | ER | Mrs. Burke | Episode: "Insurrection" |
| 2003 | Law & Order: Special Victims Unit | Rose Granville | Episode: '"Tragedy" |
| 2004 | Crossing Jordan | Frances Littleton | Episode: "Most Likely" |
| 2004 | Cold Case | Dottie | Episode: "Factory Girls" |
| 2005 | House | Georgia Adams | Episode: "Poison" |
| 2005–07 | Desperate Housewives | Phyllis Van de Kamp | 5 episodes |
| 2009 | Drop Dead Diva | Millie Carlson | Episode: "Dead Model Walking" |
| 2010 | Hot in Cleveland | Loretta | Episode: "Meet the Parents" |
| 2012 | The Mob Doctor | Ann Wilson | Episode: "Turf War" |

==== TV films, miniseries, and specials ====
| Year | Title | Role | Notes |
|---|---|---|---|
| 1967 | The Outsider | Peggy Leydon | |
| 1968 | Shadow Over Elveron | Joanne Tregaskis | |
| 1973 | The Lie | Anna | |
| 1974 | The Country Girl | Georgie Elgin | |
| 1975 | Friendly Persuasion | Eliza Birdwell | |
| 1976 | Return to Earth | Joan Aldrin | |
| 1976 | 21 Hours at Munich | Anneliese Graes | |
| 1978 | The Defection of Simas Kudirka | Genna Kudirka | |
| 1979 | Champions: A Love Story | Barbara Harlich | |
| 1979 | A Last Cry for Help | Joan Muir | |
| 1980 | Playing for Time | Frau Lagerfuhrerin Maria Mandel | |
| 1982 | Kennedy's Children | Carla | |
| 1984 | With Intent to Kill | Edna Reinecker | |
| 1991 | Bump in the Night | Katie | |
| 1991 | Shadow of a Doubt | Mrs. Potter | |
| 1991 | To Save a Child | Rinda Larson | |
| 1993 | When Love Kills: The Seduction of John Hearn | Edna Larson | |
| 1993 | A Mother's Revenge | Bess Warden | |
| 1994 | Baby Brokers | Sylvia | |
| 1995 | Children of the Dust | Aunt Bertha | |
| 1995 | Indictment: The McMartin Trial | Peggy Buckey | |
| 1996 | Stolen Memories: Secrets from the Rose Garden | Sally Ann | |
| 1996 | A Promise to Carolyn | Jolene Maggart | |
| 1996 | If These Walls Could Talk | Mary Donnelly | |
| 1998 | The Wedding | Caroline "Gram" Shelby | |
| 1998 | A Father for Brittany | Donna Minkowitz | |
| 2001 | My Louisiana Sky | Jewel Ramsey | |

== Stage credits ==
| Year | Title | Role | Notes |
|---|---|---|---|
| 1963 | Journey to the Day | Katherine | |
| 1964 | Three Sisters | Irina Sergeyevna Prozorova | |
| 1966 | Rooms | Jenny Zubitsky | |
| 1966 | We Have Always Lived in the Castle | Constance Blackwood | |
| 1969 | The Watering Place | Janet | |
| 1975–76 | Kennedy's Children | Carla | |
| 1977 | Happy End | Lt. Lillian Holiday | |
| 1977 | Landscape of the Body | Betty | |
| 1979 | A Lovely Sunday for Creve Coeur | Dorothea | |
| 1979 | Losing Time | Ruth | |
| 1984 | Come Back, Little Sheba | Lola Delaney | |
| 1997 | The Young Man from Atlanta | Lily Dale Kidder | |
| 1999 | The Vagina Monologues | —N/a | |
| 2002 | Necessary Targets | J.S. | |
| 2005 | Cycling Past the Matterhorn | Esther | |
| 2009 | Love, Loss, and What I Wore | —N/a | |
| 2012 | In Masks Outrageous and Austere | Babe Foxworth | |

== Awards and nominations ==
| Institution | Year | Category | Work | Results | Ref. |
|---|---|---|---|---|---|
| Academy Awards | 1960 | Best Supporting Actress | The Dark at the Top of the Stairs | Nominated | |
| Academy Awards | 1962 | Best Supporting Actress | Sweet Bird of Youth | Nominated | |
| CableACE Awards | 1995 | Supporting Actress in a Movie or Miniseries | Indictment: The McMartin Trial | Nominated | |
| Drama Desk Awards | 1978 | Outstanding Actress in a Play | Landscape of the Body | Nominated | |
| Drama Desk Awards | 1997 | Outstanding Actress in a Play | The Young Man from Atlanta | Nominated | |
| Gold Derby TV Awards | 2006 | Comedy Guest Actress | Desperate Housewives | Nominated | |
| Golden Globe Awards | 1960 | Most Promising Newcomer – Female | The Dark at the Top of the Stairs | Nominated | |
| Golden Globe Awards | 1960 | Best Supporting Actress – Motion Picture | The Dark at the Top of the Stairs | Nominated | |
| Golden Globe Awards | 1962 | Best Supporting Actress – Motion Picture | Sweet Bird of Youth | Nominated | |
| Golden Globe Awards | 1995 | Best Supporting Actress in a Series, Miniseries or Motion Picture Made for Television | Indictment: The McMartin Trial | Won | |
| Golden Raspberry Awards | 1981 | Worst Supporting Actress | Endless Love | Nominated | |
| High Falls Film Festival | 2006 | The Susan B. Anthony "Failure is Impossible" Award | —N/a | Won | |
| Laurel Awards | 1968 | Top Female Supporting Performance | Petulia | 5th Place | |
| Online Film & Television Association Awards | 2005 | Best Guest Actress in a Comedy Series | Desperate Housewives | Nominated | |
| Primetime Emmy Awards | 1981 | Outstanding Supporting Actress in a Limited Series or a Special | Playing for Time | Nominated | |
| Primetime Emmy Awards | 1988 | Outstanding Guest Performer in a Drama Series | Thirtysomething (Episode: "The Parents Are Coming") | Won | |
| Primetime Emmy Awards | 1989 | Outstanding Guest Actress in a Drama Series | The Equalizer (Episode: "Time Present, Time Past") | Nominated | |
| Primetime Emmy Awards | 1990 | Outstanding Guest Actress in a Drama Series | Thirtysomething (Episode: "Arizona") | Nominated | |
| Primetime Emmy Awards | 1992 | Outstanding Lead Actress in a Drama Series | Law & Order (Episode: "The Wages of Love") | Nominated | |
| Primetime Emmy Awards | 1995 | Outstanding Supporting Actress in a Miniseries or a Special | Indictment: The McMartin Trial | Won (Note: Tied with Judy Davis for Serving in Silence: The Margarethe Cammermeyer Story.) | |
| Primetime Emmy Awards | 1995 | Outstanding Guest Actress in a Drama Series | NYPD Blue (Episode: "Large Mouth Bass") | Won | |
| Primetime Emmy Awards | 2006 | Outstanding Guest Actress in a Comedy Series | Desperate Housewives | Nominated | |
| Satellite Awards | 1997 | Best Supporting Actress in a Motion Picture – Musical or Comedy | As Good as It Gets | Nominated | |
| Satellite Awards | 1998 | Best Supporting Actress in a Series, Miniseries or Motion Picture Made for Television | The Wedding | Nominated | |
| Stinkers Bad Movie Awards | 1981 | Worst On-Screen Couple | Endless Love | Nominated | |
| Tony Awards | 1976 | Best Featured Actress in a Play | Kennedy's Children | Won | |
| Tony Awards | 1997 | Best Leading Actress in a Play | The Young Man from Atlanta | Nominated | |
| Venice Film Festival | 1967 | Best Actress | Dutchman | Won | |

== See also ==
- List of American actresses
- List of actors with Academy Award nominations
- List of actors with more than one Academy Award nomination in the acting categories
- List of Primetime Emmy Award winners
- List of Golden Globe winners
