= Nazi Hunter: The Beate Klarsfeld Story =

- Genre: Drama
- Written by: Frédéric Hunter
- Directed by: Michael Lindsay-Hogg
- Starring: Farrah Fawcett; Tom Conti
- Music by: Richard Hartley
- Country of origin: United States
- Original language: English

Production
- Producer: William Kayden
- Production locations: Nice, Alpes-Maritimes, France; Paris
- Cinematography: Dick Bush
- Editor: Bill Blunden
- Running time: 120 minutes
- Production companies: Société Française de Production; William Kayden Productions; Orion Television

Original release
- Network: ABC
- Release: November 23, 1986

Nazi Hunter: The Beate Klarsfeld Story is a 1986 American made-for-television biographical drama film, starring Farrah Fawcett in the title role. The film also stars Tom Conti, Geraldine Page and Catherine Allégret.

== Plot ==
The film tells the true story on the life of Beate Klarsfeld, a German woman who documented the actions that took place during the Holocaust.

== Cast ==
- Farrah Fawcett as Beate Klarsfeld
- Tom Conti as Serge Klarsfeld
- Geraldine Page as Itta Halaunbrenner
- Hélène Vallier as Raissa Klarsfeld
- Catherine Allégret as Simone Lagrange
- Féodor Atkine as Luc Pleyel
- Liliane Rovère as Madame Kadousche
- Philippe Laudenbach as French Official

== Awards ==
Year	Ceremony	Category	Recipient	Result	Ref.
1986	Golden Globe Awards	Best Supporting Actor – Series, Miniseries or Television Film	Tom Conti	Nominated	
1986	Golden Globe Awards	Best Actress – Miniseries or Television Film	Farah Fawcett	Nominated	
1986	Golden Globe Awards	Best Supporting Actress – Series, Miniseries or Television Film	Geraldine Page	Nominated	
