= May Routh =

British-American costume designer (1934–2022)

- Born: 12 July 1934; Jabalpur, British India
- Died: 1 June 2022 (aged 87); Los Angeles, California, U.S.
- Occupation: Costume designer
- Notable work: Ronin; Being There
- Spouse: Brian Eatwell (m. 1983; died 2007)

Ida May Routh (12 July 1934 – 1 June 2022) was a British-American costume designer.

Routh was born in India, where she grew up in Jabalpur. She relocated to England for her education, graduating from the Saint Martin's School of Art.

She first worked as a fashion illustrator, with her work appearing in the magazines Vogue and Elle. In 1969, she was offered a position by her former boyfriend Brian Duffy as an assistant to costume designer Anthony Mendleson for the film Oh! What a Lovely War (1969). Her first credited work as a costume designer was for the David Bowie film The Man Who Fell to Earth (1976). Other notable credits include Being There (1979), Splash (1984), Newsies (1992) and Fatal Deception: Mrs. Lee Harvey Oswald (1993). She worked often with director John Frankenheimer, including Andersonville (1996), George Wallace (1997), Ronin (1998) and Reindeer Games (2000). She received nominations for the Primetime Emmy Award for Outstanding Costumes for a Miniseries, Movie, or Special for her work on Lucy & Desi: Before the Laughter (1991) and Andersonville.

Routh married production designer Brian Eatwell in 1983, and worked with him frequently until his death in 2007. She died on 1 June 2022, and was interred at Hollywood Forever Cemetery.
