= Golden Globe Award for Best Limited or Anthology Series or Television Film =

Annual television award

- Awarded for: Best Miniseries or Television Film
- Country: United States
- Presented by: Hollywood Foreign Press Association
- First award: February 5, 1971
- Currently held by: Adolescence (2025)
- Website: goldenglobes.org

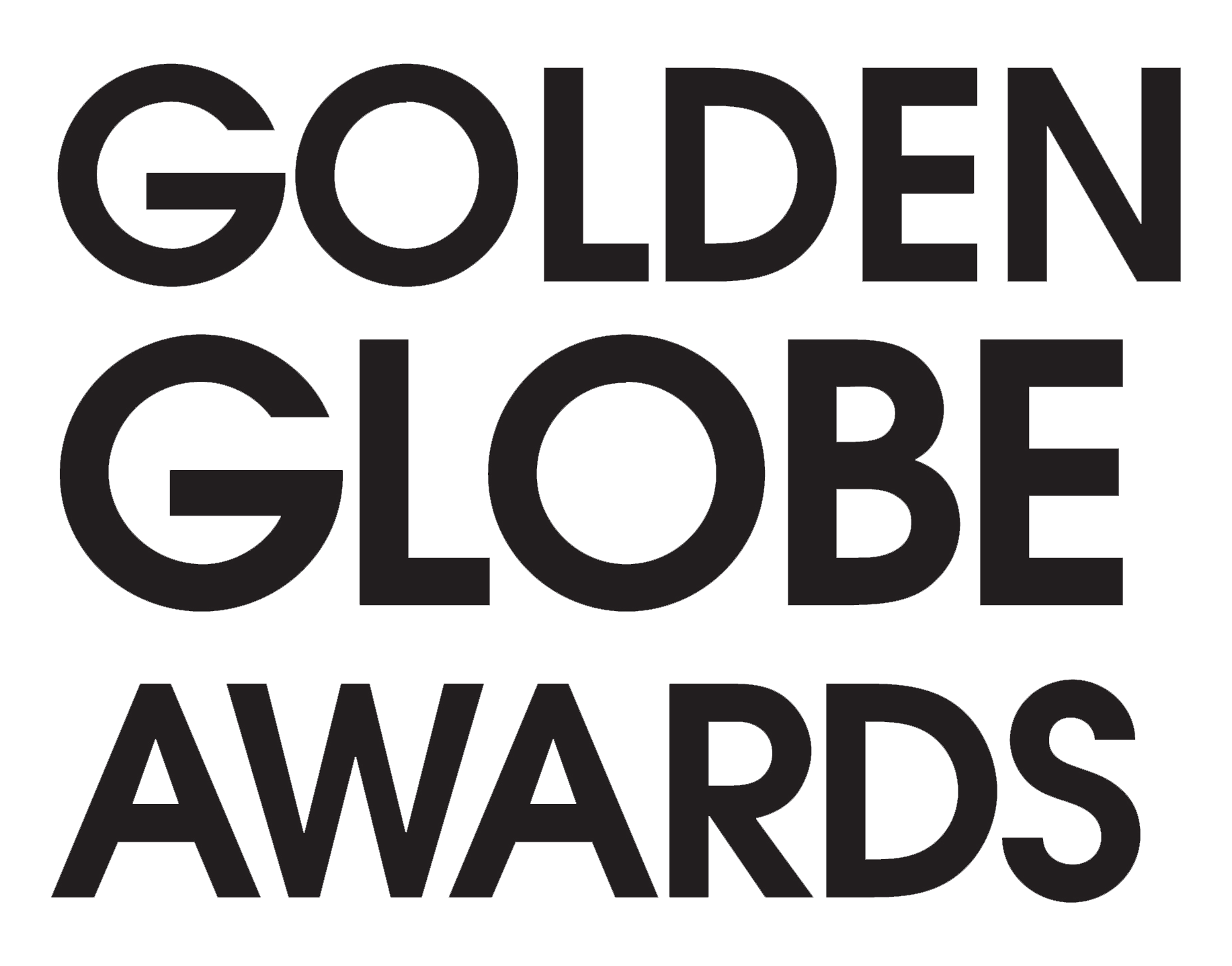
Golden Globe Awards logo

The Golden Globe Award for Best Limited or Anthology Series or Television Film is one of the annual Golden Globe Awards given to the best miniseries or made-for-television film.

== Winners and nominees ==
=== 1970s ===
Best Television Film

Year	Program	Network
1971
1971	The Snow Goose	NBC
1971	Brian's Song	ABC
1971	Duel	ABC
1971	The Homecoming: A Christmas Story	CBS
1971	The Last Child	ABC
1972
1972	That Certain Summer	ABC
1972	Footsteps	CBS
1972	The Glass House	CBS
1972	Kung Fu	ABC
1972	A War of Children	CBS

=== 1980s ===
Best Miniseries or Television Film

Year	Program	Network
1980
1980	The Shadow Box	ABC
1980	The Diary of Anne Frank	NBC
1980	The Ordeal of Dr. Mudd	CBS
1980	Playing for Time	CBS
1980	A Tale of Two Cities	CBS
1981 (TIE)
1981 (TIE)	Bill	CBS
1981 (TIE)	East of Eden	ABC
1981 (TIE)	Masada	ABC
1981 (TIE)	A Long Way Home	ABC
1981 (TIE)	Murder in Texas	NBC
1982
1982	Brideshead Revisited	PBS
1982	Eleanor, First Lady of the World	CBS
1982	In the Custody of Strangers	ABC
1982	Two of a Kind	CBS
1982	A Woman Called Golda	CBS
1983
1983	The Thorn Birds	ABC
1983	Heart of Steel	ABC
1983	Kennedy	NBC
1983	Who Will Love My Children?	ABC
1983	The Winds of War	ABC
1984
1984	Something About Amelia	ABC
1984	The Burning Bed	NBC
1984	The Dollmaker	ABC
1984	Sakharov	HBO
1984	A Streetcar Named Desire	ABC
1985
1985	The Jewel in the Crown	PBS
1985	Amos	CBS
1985	Death of a Salesman	CBS
1985	Do You Remember Love?	CBS
1985	An Early Frost	NBC
1986
1986	Promise	CBS
1986	Anastasia: The Mystery of Anna	NBC
1986	Christmas Eve	NBC
1986	Nobody's Child	CBS
1986	Peter the Great	NBC
1986	Unnatural Causes	NBC
1987 (TIE)
1987 (TIE)	Escape from Sobibor	CBS
1987 (TIE)	Poor Little Rich Girl: The Barbara Hutton Story	NBC
1987 (TIE)	After the Promise	CBS
1987 (TIE)	Echoes in the Darkness	CBS
1987 (TIE)	Foxfire	CBS
1988
1988	War and Remembrance	ABC
1988	Hemingway	Syndicated
1988	Jack the Ripper	CBS
1988	The Murder of Mary Phagan	NBC
1988	The Tenth Man	CBS
1989
1989	Lonesome Dove	CBS
1989	I Know My First Name is Steven	NBC
1989	My Name Is Bill W.	CBS
1989	Roe v. Wade	NBC
1989	Small Sacrifices	ABC

=== 1990s ===
Year	Program	Network
1990
1990	Decoration Day	NBC
1990	Caroline?	CBS
1990	Family of Spies	CBS
1990	The Kennedys of Massachusetts	ABC
1990	The Phantom of the Opera	NBC
1991
1991	One Against the Wind	ABC
1991	In a Child's Name	CBS
1991	The Josephine Baker Story	HBO
1991	Sarah, Plain and Tall	CBS
1991	Separate but Equal	ABC
1992
1992	Sinatra	CBS
1992	Citizen Cohn	HBO
1992	Jewels	NBC
1992	Miss Rose White	NBC
1992	Stalin	HBO
1993
1993	Barbarians at the Gate	HBO
1993	And the Band Played On	HBO
1993	Columbo: It's All in the Game	ABC
1993	Gypsy	CBS
1993	Heidi	Disney
1994
1994	The Burning Season	HBO
1994	Fatherland	HBO
1994	The Return of the Native	BBC
1994	Roswell	Showtime
1994	White Mile	HBO
1995
1995	Indictment: The McMartin Trial	HBO
1995	Citizen X	HBO
1995	The Heidi Chronicles	TNT
1995	Serving in Silence: The Margarethe Cammermeyer Story	NBC
1995	Truman	HBO
1996
1996	Rasputin: Dark Servant of Destiny	HBO
1996	Crime of the Century	HBO
1996	Gotti	HBO
1996	Hidden in America	Showtime
1996	If These Walls Could Talk	HBO
1996	Losing Chase	Showtime
1997
1997	George Wallace	TNT
1997	12 Angry Men	Showtime
1997	Don King: Only in America	HBO
1997	Miss Evers' Boys	HBO
1997	The Odyssey	NBC
1998
1998	From the Earth to the Moon	HBO
1998	The Baby Dance	Showtime
1998	Gia	HBO
1998	Merlin	NBC
1998	The Temptations	NBC
1999
1999	RKO 281	HBO
1999	Dash and Lilly	A&E
1999	Introducing Dorothy Dandridge	HBO
1999	Joan of Arc	CBS
1999	Witness Protection	HBO

=== 2000s ===
Year	Program	Network
2000
2000	Dirty Pictures	Showtime
2000	Fail Safe	CBS
2000	For Love or Country: The Arturo Sandoval Story	HBO
2000	Nuremberg	TNT
2000	On the Beach	Showtime
2001
2001	Band of Brothers	HBO
2001	Anne Frank: The Whole Story	ABC
2001	Conspiracy	HBO
2001	Life with Judy Garland: Me and My Shadows	ABC
2001	Wit	HBO
2002
2002	The Gathering Storm	HBO
2002	Live from Baghdad	HBO
2002	Path to War	HBO
2002	Shackleton	A&E
2002	Taken	Sci-Fi
2003
2003	Angels in America	HBO
2003	My House in Umbria	HBO
2003	Normal	HBO
2003	Soldier's Girl	Showtime
2003	The Roman Spring of Mrs. Stone	Showtime
2004
2004	The Life and Death of Peter Sellers	HBO
2004	American Family: Journey of Dreams	PBS
2004	Iron Jawed Angels	HBO
2004	The Lion in Winter	Showtime
2004	Something the Lord Made	HBO
2005
2005	Empire Falls	HBO
2005	Into the West	TNT
2005	Lackawanna Blues	HBO
2005	Sleeper Cell	Showtime
2005	Viva Blackpool	BBC
2005	Warm Springs	HBO
2006
2006	Elizabeth I	HBO
2006	Bleak House	BBC
2006	Broken Trail	AMC
2006	Mrs. Harris	HBO
2006	Prime Suspect: The Final Act	ITV
2007
2007	Longford	HBO
2007	Bury My Heart at Wounded Knee	HBO
2007	The Company	TNT
2007	Five Days	HBO / BBC
2007	The State Within	BBC
2008
2008	John Adams	HBO
2008	Bernard and Doris	HBO
2008	Cranford	PBS
2008	A Raisin in the Sun	ABC
2008	Recount	HBO
2009
2009	Grey Gardens	HBO
2009	Georgia O'Keeffe	Lifetime
2009	Into the Storm	HBO
2009	Little Dorrit	PBS
2009	Taking Chance	HBO

=== 2010s ===
Year	Program	Network
2010
2010	Carlos	Sundance Channel
2010	The Pacific	HBO
2010	The Pillars of the Earth	Starz
2010	Temple Grandin	HBO
2010	You Don't Know Jack	HBO
2011
2011	Downton Abbey	PBS
2011	Cinema Verite	HBO
2011	The Hour	BBC
2011	Mildred Pierce	HBO
2011	Too Big to Fail	HBO
2012
2012	Game Change	HBO
2012	The Girl	HBO
2012	Hatfields & McCoys	History
2012	The Hour	BBC
2012	Political Animals	USA
2013
2013	Behind the Candelabra	HBO
2013	American Horror Story: Coven	FX
2013	Dancing on the Edge	BBC
2013	Top of the Lake	Sundance Channel
2013	The White Queen	Starz
2014
2014	Fargo	FX
2014	The Missing	Starz
2014	The Normal Heart	HBO
2014	Olive Kitteridge	HBO
2014	True Detective	HBO
2015
2015	Wolf Hall	PBS
2015	American Crime	ABC
2015	American Horror Story: Hotel	FX
2015	Fargo	FX
2015	Flesh and Bone	Starz
2016
2016	The People v. O. J. Simpson: American Crime Story	FX
2016	American Crime	ABC
2016	The Dresser	BBC
2016	The Night Manager	AMC
2016	The Night Of	HBO
2017
2017	Big Little Lies	HBO
2017	Fargo	FX
2017	Feud: Bette and Joan	FX
2017	The Sinner	USA
2017	Top of the Lake: China Girl	Sundance Channel
2018
2018	The Assassination of Gianni Versace: American Crime Story	FX
2018	The Alienist	TNT
2018	Escape at Dannemora	Showtime
2018	Sharp Objects	HBO
2018	A Very English Scandal	Amazon
2019
2019	Chernobyl	HBO
2019	Catch-22	Hulu
2019	Fosse/Verdon	FX
2019	The Loudest Voice	Showtime
2019	Unbelievable	Netflix

=== 2020s ===
Year	Program	Network
2020
2020	The Queen's Gambit	Netflix
2020	Normal People	Hulu/BBC Three
2020	Small Axe	Amazon Studios/BBC
2020	The Undoing	HBO
2020	Unorthodox	Netflix
2021
2021	The Underground Railroad	Amazon Prime Video
2021	Dopesick	Hulu
2021	Impeachment: American Crime Story	FX
2021	Maid	Netflix
2021	Mare of Easttown	HBO
2022
2022	The White Lotus	HBO
2022	Black Bird	Apple TV+
2022	Dahmer – Monster: The Jeffrey Dahmer Story	Netflix
2022	The Dropout	Hulu
2022	Pam & Tommy	Hulu
2023
2023	Beef	Netflix
2023	All the Light We Cannot See	Netflix
2023	Daisy Jones & the Six	Amazon Prime Video
2023	Fargo	FX
2023	Fellow Travelers	Showtime
2023	Lessons in Chemistry	Apple TV+
2024
2024	Baby Reindeer	Netflix
2024	Disclaimer	Apple TV+
2024	Monsters: The Lyle and Erik Menendez Story	Netflix
2024	The Penguin	HBO
2024	Ripley	Netflix
2024	True Detective: Night Country	HBO
2025
2025	Adolescence	Netflix
2025	All Her Fault	Peacock
2025	The Beast in Me	Netflix
2025	Black Mirror	Netflix
2025	Dying for Sex	FX/Hulu
2025	The Girlfriend	Amazon Prime Video

== Programs with multiple awards ==
2 awards

- American Crime Story

== Programs with multiple nominations ==
4 nominations

- Fargo

3 nominations

- American Crime Story

2 nominations

- American Crime
- American Horror Story
- Monster
- Top of the Lake

== Total awards by network ==
- HBO – 20
- ABC – 7
- CBS – 5
- Netflix - 4
- PBS – 4
- FX – 3
- NBC – 3
- Amazon Prime Video – 1
- Showtime – 1
- Sundance Channel – 1
- TNT – 1

== See also ==
- Primetime Emmy Award for Outstanding Limited or Anthology Series
- Primetime Emmy Award for Outstanding Television Movie
- TCA Award for Outstanding Achievement in Movies, Miniseries and Specials
