= Laurence Rosenthal =

American composer (born 1926)

- Born: November 4, 1926 (age 100); Detroit, Michigan, U.S.
- Genre: Film score
- Occupations: composer, arranger, conductor
- Years active: 1955–2002
- Website: http://www.laurencerosenthal.com

Laurence Rosenthal (born November 4, 1926) is an American composer, arranger, and conductor for theatre, television, film, and the concert hall.

== Biography ==
Born in Detroit, Michigan, Rosenthal attended the Eastman School of Music in Rochester, New York, where he studied piano and composition. He then studied in Paris with Nadia Boulanger. Among his best-known film scores are: A Raisin in the Sun, The Miracle Worker, Becket, The Island of Dr. Moreau, Clash of the Titans, The Return of a Man Called Horse and Meetings with Remarkable Men.

Rosenthal's Broadway arranging credits include The Music Man and Donnybrook!. He composed for Sherry!, A Patriot for Me and Take Me Along (dance music only).

His daughter is stem-cell scientist Nadia Rosenthal.

== Filmography ==
Year	Title	Notes
1955	Yellowneck	
1957	Naked in the Sun	
1960–1963	The 20th Century	TV series, episodes "Dirigible" (1960) and "The Western Hero" (1963)
1961	Rashomon	TV film
1961	A Raisin in the Sun	
1961	Dark Odyssey	
1961	The Power and the Glory	TV film
1962	The Miracle Worker	
1962	Requiem for a Heavyweight	
1964	Becket	Nominated — Academy Award for Best Original Score; Nominated — Golden Globe Award for Best Original Score
1964	Brenner	TV series, episode "Charlie Paradise: The Tragic Flute"
1966	Hotel Paradiso	
1966	Michelangelo: The Last Giant	Documentary; Won — Emmy Award for Individual Achievements in Music - Composition; Nominated — Emmy Award for Individual Achievements in Music - Conducting
1967	Coronet Blue	TV series, nine episodes
1967	The Comedians	
1969	Three	
1970	How Awful About Allan	TV film
1970	The House That Would Not Die	TV film
1970	Night Chase	TV film
1971	Banyon	TV series
1971	A Gunfight	
1971	Mannix	TV series, episode "Dark So Early, Dark So Long"
1971	Sweet, Sweet Rachel	TV film
1971	The Last Child	TV film
1972	Lapin 360	
1972	Man of La Mancha	Adapted music from musical of the same name Nominated — Academy Award for Best Song Score and Adaptation
1972	The African Elephant	Composed song, "Rain Falls Anywhere It Wants To"; Nominated — Golden Globe Award for Best Original Song
1973	The Devil's Daughter	TV film
1973	The Rookies	TV series, episode "The Wheel of Death" and "Snow Job"
1973	Call to Danger	TV film
1973	Pueblo	TV film
1973	Portrait: A Man Whose Name Was John	Nominated — Emmy Award for Best Music Composition - For a Special Program
1973	Satan's School for Girls	TV film
1973–1974	Hec Ramsey	TV series, episodes "A Hard Road to Vengeance", "Dead Heat", and "Scar Tissue"
1974	Death Sentence	TV film
1974	The Missiles of October	TV film
1974	Portrait: A Man Whose Name Was John	Nominated — Emmy Award for Best Music Composition - For a Special Program
1975	The Log of the Black Pearl	TV film
1975	Barnaby Jones	TV series, episode "The Price of Terror"
1975	Rooster Cogburn	
1975	A Home of Our Own	TV film
1975	Murder on Flight 502	TV film
1976	State Fair	TV film
1976	Young Pioneers	TV film
1976	The Story of David	TV film
1976	The Return of a Man Called Horse	
1976	Death at Love House	TV film
1976	21 Hours at Munich	TV film
1976	Young Pioneers' Christmas	TV film
1977	The Amazing Howard Hughes	TV film
1977	The Island of Dr. Moreau	
1977	Logan's Run	TV series, episode "The Collectors"
1977	Murder in Peyton Place	TV film
1977	The Hunted Lady	TV film
1977–1984	Fantasy Island	TV series, seven episodes
1978	Who'll Stop the Rain	
1978	And I Alone Survived	TV film
1978	Brass Target	
1979	Meetings with Remarkable Men	
1979	Portrait of a Hitman	
1979	Meteor	
1979	Orphan Train	TV film
1980	The Day Christ Died	TV film
1980	F.D.R.: The Last Year	TV film
1980	Rage!	TV film
1980	Revenge of the Stepford Wives	TV film
1981	Clash of the Titans	Nominated — Saturn Award for Best Music
1981	The Patricia Neal Story	TV film
1982	The Letter	TV film Nominated — Emmy Award for Outstanding Achievement in Music Composition for a Limited Series or a Special (Dramatic Underscore)
1983	Who Will Love My Children?	TV film Nominated — Emmy Award for Outstanding Achievement in Music Composition for a Limited Series or a Special (Dramatic Underscore)
1983	Heart Like a Wheel	
1983	Easy Money	
1984	License to Kill	TV film
1984	The Lost Honor of Kathryn Beck	TV film
1984	George Washington	TV miniseries
1985	The Hearst and Davies Affair	TV film
1985	Consenting Adult	TV film
1985	Evergreen	TV miniseries
1985	Blackout	TV film
1985	Mussolini: The Untold Story	TV miniseries
1986	Peter the Great	TV miniseries Won — Emmy Award for Outstanding Achievement in Music Composition for a Miniseries or a Special (Dramatic Underscore)
1986	On Wings of Eagles	TV miniseries
1986	Anastasia: The Mystery of Anna	TV film Won — Emmy Award for Outstanding Achievement in Music Composition for a Miniseries or a Special (Dramatic Underscore)
1987	Stranger in My Bed	TV film
1987	Fight for Life	TV film
1987	Proud Men	TV film
1987	Downpayment on Murder	TV film
1988	Freedom Fighter	TV film
1988	The Bourne Identity	TV film Won — Emmy Award for Outstanding Achievement in Music Composition for a Miniseries or a Special (Dramatic Underscore)
1988	My Father, My Son	TV film
1988	To Heal a Nation	TV film
1988	Street of Dreams	TV film
1988	In the Line of Duty: The F.B.I. Murders	TV film
1989	Twist of Fate	TV film
1989	My Name Is Bill W.	TV film, Hallmark Hall of Fame series
1989	Brotherhood of the Rose	TV film
1989	The Forgotten	TV film
1989	Billy the Kid	TV film
1990	The Plot to Kill Hitler	TV film
1990	Blind Faith	TV miniseries
1990	The Incident	TV film
1990	The Kissing Place	TV film
1990	Tiny Toon Adventures	TV series, episode "Prom-ise Her Anything"
1991	The Strauss Dynasty	TV miniseries, one episode
1991	Mark Twain and Me	TV film
1992–1996	The Young Indiana Jones Chronicles	TV series, theme, 11 episodes, 2 TV films Won (2) — Primetime Emmy Award for Outstanding Music Composition for a Miniseries or a Special (Dramatic Underscore); Won — Primetime Emmy Award for Outstanding Individual Achievement in Music Composition for a Series (Dramatic Underscore); Nominated — Primetime Emmy Award for Outstanding Main Title Theme Music; Nominated — Primetime Emmy Award for Outstanding Individual Achievement in Music Composition for a Series (Dramatic Underscore)
1993	The Fire Next Time	TV film
1993	Triumph Over Disaster: The Hurricane Andrew Story	TV film
1995	Catherine the Great	TV film
1996	The Man Who Captured Eichmann	TV film
1997	The Member of the Wedding	TV film
1998	The Face	Short film
1998	The Echo of Thunder	TV film, Hallmark Hall of Fame series
1999	Inherit the Wind	TV film
2000	A Time for Dancing	
2001	Majestic White Horses	Short film
2001	Wild Iris	TV film
2002	Master Spy: The Robert Hanssen Story	TV film

== Awards ==
Rosenthal has also been nominated for two Oscars and two Golden Globes. He has won seven Emmy Awards and been nominated for an additional six more.

In 2023, he was awarded the Lifetime Achievement Award from the World Soundtrack Academy.

=== Academy Awards ===
Year	Nominee / work	Award	Result
1964	Becket	Best Original Score	Nominated
1972	Man of La Mancha	Best Song Score and Adaptation	Nominated

=== Emmy Awards ===
Primetime Emmys
Year	Nominee / work	Award	Result
1966	Michelangelo: The Last Giant	Individual Achievements in Music - Conducting	Nominated
1966	Michelangelo: The Last Giant	Individual Achievements in Music - Individual Achievements in Music - Composition	Won
1974	Portrait: A Man Whose Name Was John	Best Music Composition - For a Special Program	Nominated
1982	The Letter	Outstanding Achievement in Music Composition for a Limited Series or a Special (Dramatic Underscore)	Nominated
1983	Who Will Love My Children?	Outstanding Achievement in Music Composition for a Limited Series or a Special (Dramatic Underscore)	Nominated
1986	Peter the Great	Outstanding Achievement in Music Composition for a Miniseries or a Special (Dramatic Underscore)	Won
1987	Anastasia: The Mystery of Anna	Outstanding Achievement in Music Composition for a Miniseries or a Special (Dramatic Underscore)	Won
1988	The Bourne Identity	Outstanding Achievement in Music Composition for a Miniseries or a Special (Dramatic Underscore)	Won
1992	The Young Indiana Jones Chronicles	Outstanding Individual Achievement in Main Title Theme Music	Nominated
1993	The Young Indiana Jones Chronicles (For episode "Vienna, 1908")	Outstanding Individual Achievement in Music Composition for a Series (Dramatic Underscore)	Nominated
1994	The Young Indiana Jones Chronicles (For episode "Ireland, 1916")	Outstanding Individual Achievement in Music Composition for a Series (Dramatic Underscore)	Won
1995	The Adventures of Young Indiana Jones: Hollywood Follies	Outstanding Achievement in Music Composition for a Miniseries or a Special (Dramatic Underscore)	Won
1997	The Adventures of Young Indiana Jones: Travels with Father	Outstanding Achievement in Music Composition for a Miniseries or a Special (Dramatic Underscore)	Won

=== Golden Globe Awards ===
Year	Nominee / work	Award	Result
1964	Becket	Best Original Score	Nominated
1972	"Rain Falls Anywhere It Wants To" (from The African Elephant)	Best Original Song	Nominated
