= Brian Eatwell =

British art director (1939–2007)

- Born: 1 June 1939; London, England
- Died: 20 January 2007 (aged 67); Los Angeles, California, United States
- Occupation: Art director
- Years active: 1964–2002
- Spouse: May Routh (m. 1983)
- Children: 2

Brian Eatwell (1 June 1939 – 20 January 2007) was a British art director. He designed the sets for numerous British and American films and television programmes.

== Selected filmography ==
- The Shuttered Room (1967)
- Just Like a Woman (1967)
- Here We Go Round the Mulberry Bush (1968)
- The Strange Affair (1968)
- I Start Counting (1970)
- The Abominable Dr Phibes (1971)
- Secrets (1971)
- Walkabout (1971)
- Dr Phibes Rises Again (1972)
- The Three Musketeers (1973)
- The Four Musketeers (1974)
- The Man Who Fell to Earth (1976)
- The Last Remake of Beau Geste (1977)
- The Onion Field (1979)
- Fatal Deception: Mrs. Lee Harvey Oswald (1993)

== Bibliography ==
- Michael L. Stephens. Art Directors in Cinema: A Worldwide Biographical Dictionary. McFarland, 1998.
