= The Lie (1970 film) =

- Written by: Ingmar Bergman
- Directed by: Jan Molander
- Starring: Gunnel Lindblom; Per Myrberg
- Country of origin: Sweden
- Original language: Swedish

Production
- Cinematography: Jan Wictorinus, Per Olof Nordmark, Willy Thoresen
- Editor: Ronnie Årland
- Running time: 91 minutes

Original release
- Network: Sveriges Television
- Release: 28 October 1970

The Lie (Swedish: Reservatet) is a 1970 Swedish television film directed by Jan Molander and written by Ingmar Bergman. Bergman wrote the script in 1968 with the name of "Reservatet: en banalitetens tragikomedi" (A tragicomedy of Banality). Although he did not direct it, he later tackled another relationship in a film with the same "Anna" and "Andreas" in the main roles: The Passion of Anna (1968).

The same script in translation was also used for two English language television productions. A 1970 British version was directed by Alan Bridges and a 1973 American version was directed by Alex Segal, both of which used the title The Lie. The 1973 version starred Academy Award-nominated actors George Segal and Shirley Knight.
