= Kennedy's Children =

Play by Robert Patrick written in 1973

- Written by: Robert Patrick
- Characters: Wanda; Bartender; Sparger; Mark; Rona; Carla
- Original language: English
- Genre: Drama
- Setting: Lower East Side, New York City

Premiere
- Date premiered: October 30, 1974
- Place premiered: King's Head Theatre, London

Kennedy's Children is a 1973 play written by Robert Patrick. It originally opened on Broadway on November 3, 1975, and closed on January 4, 1976.

== Synopsis ==
Five people in a dive bar on the Lower East Side of Manhattan contemplate their life ten years after John F. Kennedy's assassination.

== Background ==
The soldier character, Mark, was written originally by Patrick for his off-Broadway play in 1970 "A Bad Place to Get Your Head".

For the original cast, Mary Woronov was originally wanted for Carla. They begged Lily Tomlin to play Rona, and later asked Shirley MacLaine to play Carla, who after seeing the show, approached Patrick in the lobby, shook him, and said "Why didn't you make me play Carla?". Julie Newmar, who stated "only I am Carla", tried to pull him out of cab to convince him, but his boyfriend at the time won the tug-of-war.

Patrick stated he regretted the casting of the replacement company. They hired Shelley Winters for the Chicago cast only, and she stated she did not have to learn lines, just improvise.

== Productions ==
Originally it premiered Off Off Broadway at the Clark Center for Performing Arts in 1973, starred Don Parker, and ran for three hours and forty minutes. With no producer, it was not staged fully for another year in 1974 in London's, King's Head Theatre, with Parker portraying Spranger and directed by Clive Donner. It premiered on October 30, 1974, and eventually transferred to Arts Theatre, becoming the first "fringe" play to transfer to the West End.

It premiered on November 3, 1975 at the John Golden Theatre. It was directed by Clive Donner, design Santo Loquasto, and lighting design Martin Aronstein. The cast were Barbara Montgomery (Wanda), Douglas Travis (Bartender), Don Parker (Spranger), Michael Sacks (Mark), Kaiulani Lee (Rona), and Shirley Knight (Carla).

It was later made into a TV film in 1982, with Merrill Brockway and Marshall W. Mason directing, starring Jane Alexander (Wanda), Lindsay Crouse (Rona), Brad Dourif (Mark), Charles Harper (Sparger), and Shirley Knight (Carla).

== Awards and nominations ==
=== Original Broadway production ===
Year	Award	Category	Nominee	Result
1976	Tony Awards	Best Performance by a Featured Actress in a Play	Shirley Knight	Won
1976	Drama Desk Award	Best Play	Kennedy's Children	Nominated
1976	Drama Desk Award	Outstanding Set Design	Santo Loquasto	Nominated
1976	Drama Desk Award	Outstanding Featured Actress in a Play	Kaiulani Lee	Nominated
