= The Counterfeit Killer =

1968 film by Joseph Lejtes

- Theatrical release poster
- Directed by: Józef Lejtes
- Written by: Steven Bochco; Harold Clements
- Produced by: Harry Tatelman
- Starring: Jack Lord; Shirley Knight; Jack Weston; Charles Drake; Joseph Wiseman; Don Hanmer
- Cinematography: Benjamin H. Kline; John F. Warren
- Edited by: Tony Martinelli
- Music by: Quincy Jones
- Production company: Universal Pictures
- Distributed by: Universal Pictures
- Release date: May 1968
- Running time: 95 minutes
- Country: United States
- Language: English

The Counterfeit Killer is a 1968 American crime film directed by Józef Lejtes and written by Steven Bochco and Harold Clements. The film stars Jack Lord, Shirley Knight, Jack Weston, Charles Drake, Joseph Wiseman and Don Hanmer. The film was released in May 1968, by Universal Pictures.

== Plot ==
Is there a link between the murder of five foreign sailors from the East whose bodies have been found on the San Pedro waterfront and the issue of one million counterfeit dollars in the USA? Don Owens, an undercover agent, assisted by Angie, a beautiful but embittered widow who has fallen for him, does his best to untangle the knot.

== Cast ==
- Jack Lord as Don Owens
- Shirley Knight as Angie Peterson
- Jack Weston as Randolph Riker
- Charles Drake as Dolan
- Joseph Wiseman as Rajeski
- Don Hanmer as O'Hara
- Robert Pine as Ed
- George Tyne as George
- Cal Bartlett as Reggie
- Hans Heyde as Keyser
- L. Q. Jones as Hotel Clerk
- David Renard as Ambulance Attendant
- Nicholas Colasanto as Plainclothesman
- Mercedes McCambridge as Frances

== Reception ==
According to IMDb, the film has a critic rating of 4.8/10.
