= The Strange Affair =

1968 British film by David Greene

- Australian daybill poster
- Directed by: David Greene
- Screenplay by: Eve Greene; Stanley Mann; Jerome Odlum; Oscar Saul
- Based on: The Strange Affair by Bernard Toms
- Produced by: Howard Harrison; Stanley Mann
- Starring: Michael York; Jeremy Kemp; Susan George
- Cinematography: Franz F. Palmer; Alex Thomson
- Edited by: Brian Smedley-Aston
- Music by: Basil Kirchin; Jack Nathan (uncredited)
- Production company: Paramount British Pictures
- Distributed by: Paramount British Pictures
- Release date: 24 July 1968
- Running time: 106 minutes
- Country: United Kingdom
- Language: English

The Strange Affair is a 1968 British crime drama film directed by David Greene and starring Michael York, Jeremy Kemp and Susan George. It is based on the 1966 novel by former Metropolitan policeman and private investigator Bernard Toms that was believed to be based on policeman Harold Challenor.

== Plot ==
Peter Strange is an idealistic young police recruit who gets mixed up with the machinations of the tough and jaded Scotland Yard Detective Sergeant Pierce. Pierce is trying to arrest a gang for drug smuggling and later murder, but is thwarted respectively by a corrupt colleague and an unconvincing witness. Strange is shocked by finding the dead body of a murdered informant he knew and is himself brutally assaulted. Meanwhile, Strange is having an affair with Frederika, a minor who he does not know is part of a pornography ring; her supposed aunt and uncle film and photograph her sexual encounters from behind a one-way mirror. (Susan George was 17 at the time the film was shot.)

Pierce obtains copies of photographs of Strange's sexual encounter with Frederika and threatens to expose him to his superiors, ending his career, unless Strange plants some heroin on one of the gang. Strange reluctantly agrees, despite planning to leave the force anyway, as he is disillusioned by the failure to catch and convict the drug gang. Strange's planting of evidence is revealed and he is convicted of perverting the course of justice and driven away to be jailed.

== Cast ==
- Michael York as Peter Strange
- Jeremy Kemp as Pierce
- Susan George as Frederika 'Fred' March
- Jack Watson as Quince
- George A. Cooper as Kingsley
- Barry Fantoni as Charley Small
- Jeremy Wilkin as PC Wills
- Rita Webb as Charley's mum
- Madge Ryan as Aunt Mary
- George Benson as Uncle Bertrand
- Nigel Davenport as Defence Attorney
- Artro Morris as Inspector Evans
- Patrick Connor as Sergeant Mac

== Production ==
It was shot at Twickenham Studios and on location around London. The film's sets were designed by the art director Brian Eatwell.

== Home Media ==
Vinegar Syndrome, in association with Paramount Pictures, released A STRANGE AFFAIR for its first-ever homevideo release via Blu-ray in late October 2025. The packaging states "Vinegar Syndrome Labs is proud to offer the disc debut of this police thriller, newly restored in 4k from its original Techniscope negative."

== Critical reception ==
The Monthly Film Bulletin wrote: "Greene gets strong performances from his cast (particularly from Jeremy Kemp as the psychotic Pierce); and if he is ill served by a script which too often falls back on coincidence to tie up its loose ends, it is all the more to his credit that, for the duration of the film at least, this weakness is barely noticeable."

Allmovie wrote: "a fragmentary "'60s" interpretation of a straightforward Bernard Toms novel ... Like many British films of its period, it seems more concerned with inducing pop-art headaches than simply telling its story.

Time Out wrote: "a well-written anecdote about police manners and methods, straight out of some TV cop series, but as viewed by Greene's wilfully wayward camera, it becomes a bizarre, quirkishly funny thriller which laces its documentary surface with a fine grain of fantasy. Much of Greene's later work disappointed, but here he displays a visual flair (gang violence in an echoing warehouse, murder among the wrecked cars in a scrapheap, seduction in a fantastically opulent boudoir) that would not entirely have shamed Welles in his Lady from Shanghai [1947] mood.

The New York Times wrote: "If the muscular and sexy goings-on are excessive and irrational on occasion, some of the principals lend credible, physical support to their characterizations. Michael York ... is properly personable and confused as the harried Strange. Susan George, a comparative newcomer who is pert, snub-nosed and pretty, makes eroticism a pleasure, even if her sudden switch from promiscuity to Strange's everloving girl, remains a mystery. Jeremy Kemp is convincingly neurotic as the indomitable sergeant ... They all prove that The Strange Affair is where the sensational action is, even if it is entirely strange and unbelievable.
