= Peter the Great (miniseries) =

1986 American television miniseries

- Based on: Peter the Great: His Life and World by Robert K. Massie
- Written by: Edward Anhalt
- Directed by: Marvin J. Chomsky; Lawrence Schiller
- Starring: Maximilian Schell; Vanessa Redgrave; Omar Sharif; Trevor Howard; Laurence Olivier; Helmut Griem; Jan Niklas; Elke Sommer; Renée Soutendijk; Ursula Andress; Mel Ferrer
- Composer: Laurence Rosenthal
- Country of origin: United States
- Original language: English
- No. of episodes: 4

Production
- Executive producer: Lawrence Schiller
- Producer: Marvin J. Chomsky
- Cinematography: Vittorio Storaro
- Editor: Bill Parker
- Running time: 480 minutes
- Production company: P.T.G. Productions

Original release
- Network: NBC
- Release: February 2 – February 5, 1986

Peter the Great is a 1986 American biographical historical drama television miniseries on the life of Peter the Great, Tsar of Russia. It was directed by Marvin J. Chomsky and Lawrence Schiller, based on Robert K. Massie's 1980 non-fiction book Peter the Great: His Life and World. It stars an ensemble cast consisting of Maximilian Schell, Vanessa Redgrave, Omar Sharif, Trevor Howard, Laurence Olivier, Lilli Palmer, Helmut Griem, Jan Niklas, Elke Sommer, Renée Soutendijk, Ursula Andress, and Mel Ferrer.

The miniseries was some 8 hours length (over 4 episodes) and cost $29 million USD at the time to create. It was the first tv show made in Russia by US production during the end of the Cold War though it was arduous to produce.

== Production ==
The production was notable for its extensive filming within the Soviet Union, with contemporary reports describing it as the first independent American production made there and the first major American based production to film in the country. The project was negotiated during a period of strained relations between the United States and the Soviet Union, after producer Lawrence Schiller approached the Soviet state film agency Sovinfilm in 1982 and obtained approval for Edward Anhalt's screenplay. Under the resulting agreements, Sovinfilm supplied 21 principal Soviet actors, costumes, facilities at the Gorky Film Studio in Moscow and assistance from units of the Soviet Army, at a fixed cost of US$5 million. After preliminary filming in Austria, the production spent 26 weeks filming in the Soviet Union during 1984 and 1985, including at Bukhara and Suzdal, where the city's historic buildings and a large constructed wall represented seventeenth century Moscow and the Kremlin. The production was nevertheless marked by serious internal disputes: Schiller was removed as director immediately before filming began on Soviet territory, Marvin J. Chomsky was brought in to complete the project, and the cast and crew subsequently worked through severe winter conditions and lengthy delays.

=== Score ===
The score was composed by Laurence Rosenthal. Rosenthal made the score based on earlier work he done during his Air Force Service.

== Cast ==
- Maximilian Schell as Peter the Great
- Jan Niklas as Peter the Great in early adulthood
- Vanessa Redgrave as Tsarevna Sophia
- Omar Sharif as Prince Feodor Romodanovsky
- Laurence Olivier as William III and II, King of England, Scotland and Ireland
- Trevor Howard as Sir Isaac Newton
- Ursula Andress as Athalie
- Olegar Fedoro as Boyar Lopukhin
- Natalya Andrejchenko as Tsaritsa Eudoxia Lopukhina
- Helmut Griem as Captain Alexander Menshikov
- Renée Soutendijk as Anna Mons (Peter's Dutch mistress)
- Hanna Schygulla as Catherine Skavronskaya (Peter's 2nd mistress and later on wife)
- Christoph Eichhorn as Charles XII, King of Sweden
- Lilli Palmer as Tsarina Natalya, mother of Peter the Great
- Mel Ferrer as Frederick I, King in Prussia
- Elke Sommer as Charlotte, Queen in Prussia
- Jan Malmsjö as The Patriarch
- Boris Plotnikov as Tsarevich Alexis
- Jeremy Kemp as General Patrick Gordon
- Geoffrey Whitehead as Prince Vasily Golitsyn
- Graham McGrath as young adult Peter the Great
- Günther Maria Halmer as Tolstoy
- Dennis DeMarne as the figure of Peter the Great at the narrating scenes of the later years
- Ann Zacharias as Daria Lund, the mistress of Captain Alexander Menshikov
- Algis Arlauskas as Father Theodosius

The series was released as a three-tape VHS box (set in 1992, then, in 1994, as a single, lengthy VHS tape).

Aleksandr Karin, the main stuntman on the film died 13 March 2026, aged 73.

== Awards and nominations ==
The miniseries received generally positive reviews from critics and won three Primetime Emmy Awards, including Outstanding Miniseries. It was also nominated for three Golden Globe Awards, including Best Miniseries or Television Film.

Year	Award	Category	Recipient(s)	Result
1986	38th Primetime Emmy Awards	Outstanding Miniseries	Marvin J. Chomsky; Lawrence Schiller; Konstantin Thoeren	Won
1986	38th Primetime Emmy Awards	Outstanding Supporting Actress in a Miniseries or a Special	Vanessa Redgrave	Nominated
1986	38th Primetime Emmy Awards	Outstanding Achievement in Music Composition for a Miniseries or a Special (Dramatic Underscore)	"Part 1"; Laurence Rosenthal	Won
1986	38th Primetime Emmy Awards	Outstanding Art Direction for a Miniseries or a Special	"Part 1"; John Blezard; Alfred Dobsak; Alexander Popov	Nominated
1986	38th Primetime Emmy Awards	Outstanding Cinematography for a Miniseries or a Special	"Part 3"; Vittorio Storaro	Nominated
1986	38th Primetime Emmy Awards	Outstanding Costume Design for a Miniseries or a Special	"Part 1"; Ella Maklakova; Sibylle Ulsamer	Won
1986	38th Primetime Emmy Awards	Outstanding Sound Editing for a Miniseries or a Special	"Part 1"; David D. Caldwell; Dan Carlin Sr. Terry Chambers; Paul B. Clay; Brian Courcier; Dan Finnerty; James Koford; Linda Moss; Richard Raderman; Greg Stacy; Marty Stein; James Troutman; Mike Virnig	Nominated
1986	33rd Golden Reel Awards	Television Mini-Series: Sound Editing	Greg Stacy; Sync-Pop	Nominated
1987	44th Golden Globe Awards	Best Miniseries or Television Film	Peter the Great	Nominated
1987	44th Golden Globe Awards	Best Actor in a Miniseries or Television Film	Jan Niklas	Nominated
1987	44th Golden Globe Awards	Best Supporting Actress in a Series, Miniseries or Television Film	Lilli Palmer	Nominated
1987	39th Writers Guild of America Awards	Television: Long Form – Adapted	Edward Anhalt	Won
1987	22nd Goldene Kamera	Best German Actress	Hanna Schygulla	Won
