= Luttif Afif =

Palestinian terrorist commander of 1972 Munich massacre

- لطيف عفيف
- Afif during the Munich hostage crisis, 1972
- Born: 1937/1945; Nazareth, Mandatory Palestine
- Died: 6 September 1972 (aged 34–35) or (aged 26–27); Fürstenfeldbruck, West Germany
- Cause of death: Gunshot
- Resting place: Sidi Munaidess Cemetery; Tripoli, Libya
- Other names: Issa
- Occupation: Militant (Black September Organization)

Luttif Afif (Arabic: لطيف عفيف; 1937 or 1945 – 6 September 1972; alias "Issa"—Jesus in Arabic) was a Palestinian militant who commanded the Munich massacre, a terrorist attack in the Munich Olympic Village on 5 September 1972.

Afif was born to an Arab Christian family in Nazareth, Mandatory Palestine in 1937. In 1958, he moved to West Germany to study engineering, learned the language, and then moved to France to work. Afif joined the Palestinian militant organization Fatah in 1966, possibly while residing in Germany. He later returned to the Middle East to fight several battles against Israel. He also likely participated in Jordan's Black September in 1970. In the early 1970s, Afif was living in Berlin and was engaged to a German woman.

In 1972, Afif commanded the Munich massacre attack team, which took nine members of Israel's Olympic team hostage after two others, who had offered resistance, were shot dead. Afif was the chief negotiator on behalf of the Palestinians, who were members of the Black September offshoot of Yassir Arafat's Palestine Liberation Organization. Afif and four of his collaborators were later killed by German snipers at Fürstenfeldbruck Air Base outside Munich. He called the operation Iqrit and Kafr Bir'im, after two Christian Palestinian villages whose inhabitants were expelled by Israel during the 1948 Palestine war.

== Early life ==
Luttif Afif was born in Nazareth, Mandatory Palestine, in 1937. Biographies of Afif claimed that his mother was Jewish, while his father was a wealthy Christian Arab businessman. However, both his family and Israel's interior ministry records dispute the claim about his mother. According to the records, his mother, Arifa, was born in 1920 to Hassan and Amina. Afif had three brothers, all of whom were in Black September; two were in Israeli jails. In 1958, he moved to West Germany to study engineering, learned the language, and then moved to France to work.

According to Simon Reeve, Afif enjoyed the time he spent in Europe, but joined Fatah in 1966, possibly while residing in Germany. He later returned to the Middle East.

Abu Iyad, the head of Black September, wrote that both Afif and his second-in-command, Tony, had fought in Amman in September 1970 and in the battle of Jerash and Ajlun in July 1971. In the early 1970s, Afif was living in Berlin and was engaged to a German woman.

== Munich massacre ==
According to several sources, including Serge Groussard and Simon Reeve, Afif claimed that his own personal reason for taking the Israelis hostage was to get his two brothers out of Israeli prisons. He was described by Manfred Schreiber, chief of the Munich police and one of the German negotiators, as "very cool and determined, clearly fanatical in his convictions"; someone who expressed his demands in a forceful manner and at times "sounded like [one of] those people who aren't completely anchored in reality." Various photos of the hostage crisis show Afif wearing a white beach hat and a linen safari suit, with his face covered in charcoal or shoe polish.

To Walther Tröger, then-mayor of the Olympic Village, Afif gave the impression of being an "intelligent and reasonable man," unlike his comrades, who in the eyes of the Olympic official were "gallow birds" (German: Galgenvögel). Tröger said he obviously did not like Afif because of what he was doing, but he could have liked him if he had met him elsewhere.

Afif spent most of his time in front of 31 Connollystraße, chatting with either the German delegation or the young police officer Anneliese Graes. According to Graes, Afif spoke fluent German with a French accent. She described him as "always polite and correct". When he was asked not to wave his hand grenade in front of her, he simply laughed and replied, "you have nothing to fear from me".

After tense negotiations, the hostage crisis ended after 21 hours, with a bungled ambush of the hostage takers at Fürstenfeldbruck airbase outside of Munich. Afif and four of his compatriots were killed by German snipers, but not before machine-gunning all nine remaining hostages and blowing up a helicopter containing four of them with a hand grenade. Afif is reported in most accounts of the event (and depicted in the films Munich and 21 Hours at Munich) as the guerrilla who threw the hand grenade into the eastern helicopter. Autopsy reports show that the hostages in this helicopter were shot as well; it stands to reason that Afif performed both actions. Another fedayeen, identified by Simon Reeve as Adnan Al-Gashey, machine-gunned the remaining hostages in the western helicopter seconds later.

The bodies of Afif and his four compatriots were turned over to Libya, and after a procession from Martyrs' Square, Tripoli, they were buried at the Sidi Munaidess Cemetery.

== In popular culture ==
In Serge Groussard's The Blood of Israel, Afif was misidentified as Mohammed Safady, one of the terrorists who actually survived the Fürstenfeldbruck gunfight. Another identity was suggested for Afif in Aaron Klein's Striking Back; he identifies the terrorist leader as "Mohammed Massalha", who turned out to be Afif's own father.

Afif was portrayed by Italian actor Franco Nero in the 1976 TV movie 21 Hours at Munich and by French actor Karim Saleh in Steven Spielberg's film Munich (2005).

== See also ==
- Mossad assassinations following the Munich massacre
- List of hostage crises
