= Red Hot (film) =

- Promotional film poster
- Directed by: Paul Haggis
- Written by: Paul Haggis; Michael Maurer
- Starring: Balthazar Getty; Carla Gugino; Jan Niklas
- Cinematography: Vernon Layton
- Edited by: Nick Rotundo
- Music by: Peter Breiner
- Release date: October 16, 1993
- Running time: 95 minutes
- Country: Canada
- Language: English

Red Hot is a 1993 Canadian drama film directed by Paul Haggis. The film was Haggis' feature film directorial debut. Filmed in Riga, Latvia, it is set in Soviet Union-time Riga of 1950s.

== Plot ==
Alexi, a poor music school student in Riga in 1957, is gifted some contraband American rock and roll records from his traveling uncle Dimitri. Alexi gains work as a music tutor for his fellow student Valentina, the daughter of a wealthy KGB commander, and gives her a copy of one of the records recorded onto an X-ray. A record dropped by Alexi on the street is found by a KGB officer named Gurevitch, who begins investigating Valentina and her parents.

In order to secretly form a band, Alexi and his friends Yorgi and Yuri buy American instruments from the black market dealer Leonid, who also provides information to Gurevitch. Dimitri is arrested by Gurevitch but Valentina's father Mr. Kirov has Gurevitch transferred to Kurdistan and destroys all records of the investigation. Valentina stops meeting with Alexi at the request of her father.

Alexi skips his audition to get into the academy and instead goes to an abandoned warehouse where his band is to perform a secret concert that night. After giving their audition performances, the other students from the school attend the concert as well. Gurevitch informs the KGB, who arrive with tanks and arrest Valentina and Alexi. Alexi serves seven years in prison, after which he and Valentina escape to Oslo and request political asylum.

== Cast ==
- Balthazar Getty as Alexi
- Carla Gugino as Valentina
- Jan Niklas as Yorgi
- Hugh O'Conor as Yuri
- Armin Mueller-Stahl as Dimitri
- Donald Sutherland as Kirov
- George de la Peña as Gurevitch
- Martin McKellan as Leonid

== Production ==
Filming was reported to begin in Latvia on June 8, 1992.
