= Secrets (1971 film) =

- Directed by: Philip Saville
- Written by: Rosemary Davies
- Based on: story by Philip Saville
- Produced by: John Hanson
- Starring: Jacqueline Bisset; Per Oscarsson; Robert Powell
- Cinematography: Harry Hart; Nicholas D. Knowland
- Edited by: Tony Woollard
- Music by: Michael Gibbs
- Production company: Satori Films
- Distributed by: Satori Films
- Release date: December 10, 1971
- Running time: 92 minutes
- Country: United Kingdom
- Language: English

Secrets is a 1971 British drama film directed by Philip Saville, and starring Jacqueline Bisset, Per Oscarsson, Shirley Knight and Robert Powell.

== Synopsis ==
Over the course of a single day a couple's strained marriage is revealed and then cured by their flirtations with strangers.

== Cast ==
- Jacqueline Bisset as Jennifer Wood
- Per Oscarsson as Raoul Kramer
- Robert Powell as Allan Wood
- Shirley Knight as Beatrice
- Martin C. Thurley as Raymond
- Peter Jeffries as Interviewer
- Stephen Martin as Dominic
- Tarka Kings as Judy Wood

== Production ==
The film was made on location around London including in Hyde Park. The film's sets were designed by the art director Brian Eatwell. The film was shot in Super 16mm which the producer claim was 80% cheaper than if it had been shot on 35 mm.

As stated in a 5 May 1978 HR brief, Jacqueline Bisset was displeased by Lone Star's exploitation of her nude love scene. HR noted that Secrets was initially purchased by Lone Star to be converted into a pornographic short film, and Penthouse, Playboy and Hustler were reportedly bidding up to $60,000 to acquire still photographs from the picture. A 13 Mar 1978 Box advertisement for the R-rated film offered distributors a $10,000 challenge to disprove Bisset's contention that she did not appear in the disputed nude love scenes, using the controversy to sell the picture to exhibitors.

== Release ==
The film opened in London on 10 December 1971.

Sight and Sound said it "would hardly pass an hour on television."

The New Statesman called it "a silliness."

The Monthly Film Bulletin said "technical experiment is the film's only novelty."

=== US Release ===
The film was released in the United States in 1978 with publicity highlighting the fact it featured a nude scene from Bisset. The Los Angeles Times called it "among Bisset's best films."
