= A Lovely Sunday for Creve Coeur =

One-act play by Tennessee Williams

First edition (publ. New Directions, 1980)

A Lovely Sunday for Creve Coeur is a one-act play with two scenes by Tennessee Williams.

== Plot synopsis ==
Set in St. Louis in the mid-1930s, the play focuses on four women struggling for a sense of identity and independence. Dorothea, a deluded Blanche DuBois-like middle-aged civics teacher at the local high school, fantasizes her cad of a beau, school principal T. Ralph Ellis, is really Prince Charming after allowing him to seduce her in the back seat of his car. Her slovenly but good-hearted hard-of-hearing roommate Bodey unrelentingly urges Dottie to strike up a relationship with her portly, fashion-challenged, cigar-chomping twin brother Buddy (who never is seen onstage). Sophie Gluck, a German immigrant manic-depressive mourning the loss of her beloved mother, is another tenant in the building, and Helena is Dottie's upscale and haughty friend and colleague.

Dorothea is planning to leave the crowded, tacky efficiency apartment she shares with Bodey and move in with Helena in order to have a larger and nicer place in which she can entertain the man she believes intends to marry her. Helena arrives to get a check from Dorothea to cover her share of the first month's rent. Dorothea is scheduled to join Bodey and Buddy for their weekly Sunday picnic in Creve Coeur Park, a short trolley car ride away, but she delays her departure, certain Mr. Ellis is going to call. Unbeknownst to her, his engagement to another woman has been announced in the society section of the morning newspaper, which Bodey, anticipating her reaction, has managed to conceal from her. Helena cruelly reveals the news, leaving Dorothea devastated and no longer interested in moving to a more expensive apartment she no longer needs and can't afford. Angered by the sudden change in plans, Helena tells Dorothea she's on a social and cultural level with Bodey and Buddy, and therefore undeserving of her friendship, and stalks out. Dorothea, realizing the unappealing Buddy may be her only chance for love, rushes off to catch him and his sister at the trolley stop.

== Productions ==
In 1976, Tennessee Williams wrote Creve Coeur, a one-act play he considered a companion piece to Demolition Downtown, a short work that had been published in Esquire in 1971. Craig Anderson, director of the off-Broadway Hudson Guild Theatre in New York City, read it in 1977 and agreed to stage it. Williams expanded and revised it, and the play, directed by Keith Hack, who had directed a critically acclaimed production of the Williams play Vieux Carré in London two years earlier, premiered at the Spoleto Arts Festival in Charleston, South Carolina in June 1978 originally called Molly, with Shirley Knight as Dorothea and Jane Alexander. Mel Gussow of The New York Times described it as "tender, poignant and measurably human" but added, "this is still a play in evolution." Williams continued to work on the play and changed its title to A Lovely Sunday for Creve Coeur. Again directed by Hack, with Knight reprising her role, it opened at the Hudson Guild Theatre in January 1979. Reviewing it in the New York Post, Clive Barnes said, "This is not your usual Tennessee tourist trip" and added, "But it is sweet, honest, compassionate, different and totally enjoyable." The play closed the following month.

Canada's Shaw Festival staged A Lovely Sunday for Creve Coeur as part of their 2014/15 season. The production was directed by Blair Williams and starred Deborah Hay as Dorothea.
