= Anneliese Graes =

German police detective (1930–1992)

Anneliese Graes (November 5, 1930 – June 1, 1992) was a chief detective (1951–1991) from Essen, Germany, who acted as mediator between German officials and Black September terrorists during the 1972 Munich Olympic Games after eight Black September terrorists broke into the Israeli Olympic delegation building at 31 Connollystrasse, taking eleven of the Israeli delegation hostage during the early hours of 5 September 1972.

== Involvement in the Munich Massacre ==
Graes had volunteered to work as one of 2,000 Olympic security guards during the 1972 Munich Olympic Games. Upon hearing of the hostage taking Graes rushed to 31 Connollystraße to volunteer as intermediary. According to Simon Reeve, author of the book One Day in September, Graes had a mature, easy manner which her superiors had hoped would put the terrorists at ease.

At 8:10 am Graes made her way to 31 Connollystraße to replace Frau Lauterbach, a young policewoman who had already gone to 31 Connollystraße to establish contact with the terrorists. Although Simon Reeve intimates that Graes volunteered to be an intermediary and was chosen by Manfred Schreiber for the task, it appears Graes went to the scene of her own volition and began to act as intermediary without any prior instruction from her superiors. She would act as the intermediary between the Black September leader Luttif Afif and the German delegation until the terrorists and Israeli hostages left 31 Connollystraße via the underground car park by bus, and then to waiting helicopters which were supposed to transport them to Fürstenfeldbruck Air Base.

It was clear from the outset that Afif was quite comfortable with Graes, both could be seen chatting regularly in front of 31 Connollystraße when Afif was not involved in negotiations with the German delegation. Afif told Graes about his life, most of which was corroborated later by Palestinian sources. Afif offered Graes cigarettes and even shared food with Graes; at one point both could be seen eating bananas and then tossing the skins through the front door of 31 Connollystraße before Afif picked them up.

== Aftermath ==
Graes gave evidence to the official Bavarian pre-criminal investigation into the events of 5 September.

In 1974 Graes was awarded the Order of Merit of the Federal Republic of Germany for her actions. She only rarely spoke about her involvement in the Munich crisis and refused all offers of money for her story regarding the events of that day.

== Death ==
Graes died in Bottrop, Germany, aged 62. She requested she be buried with her Order of Merit of the Federal Republic of Germany.

== In popular media ==
21 Hours at Munich, a 1976 feature film about the events in Munich

München 72, a 2012 German TV feature film
