= Anastasia: The Mystery of Anna =

1986 TV film directed by Marvin J. Chomsky

- DVD release cover
- Written by: James Goldman
- Directed by: Marvin J. Chomsky
- Creative director: Marvin J. Chomsky
- Starring: Amy Irving; Olivia de Havilland; Rex Harrison; Jan Niklas; Omar Sharif
- Composer: Laurence Rosenthal
- Countries of origin: United States; Austria; Italy
- Original language: English
- No. of seasons: 1
- No. of episodes: 2

Production
- Producers: Lance H. Robbins; Cheryl Saban
- Cinematography: Thomas L. Callaway
- Running time: 195 minutes
- Production companies: Telecom Entertainment Inc. Consolidated Entertainment; Reteitalia

Original release
- Release: December 7 – December 8, 1986

Anastasia: The Mystery of Anna (also titled Anastasia: The Story of Anna) is a 1986 American-Austrian-Italian made-for-television biographical film directed by Marvin J. Chomsky, starring Amy Irving, Rex Harrison (in his last performance), Olivia de Havilland, Omar Sharif, Christian Bale (in his first film) and Jan Niklas. The film was loosely based on the story of Grand Duchess Anastasia Nikolaevna of Russia and the book The Riddle of Anna Anderson by Peter Kurth. It was originally broadcast in two parts.

== Plot ==
The film begins in December 1916, at a lavish ballroom gathering just before the Russian Revolution, and moves to the 1917 February Revolution, the Imperial family's forced exile to Siberia that summer after Tsar Nicholas II's forced abdication in March, the late 1917 October Revolution, the Communist takeover, the start of the Russian Civil War, and then July 1918, when the Romanovs are executed. The film then revolves around a woman named Anna Anderson, who believes that she is the Grand Duchess Anastasia Nikolaevna of Russia, the Tsar's youngest daughter. Anna first tells her story in the 1920s, when she was an inmate in a Berlin asylum after her suicide attempt. Her story of escaping from the Bolsheviks seemed so vivid that many Russian expatriates were willing to believe her. She slowly gains more trust, but the other Romanov exiles are very hesitant to believe her tale and send her away.

Anna travels to the American branches of the family in New York City in 1928, and Nicholas's mother, Dowager Empress Maria Feodorovna, dies in her native Denmark. America's expatriate Romanovs also eventually publicly denounce her as an impostor and coldly snub her at the Dowager Empress's funeral, which causes her to leave the country in 1931 and return to Germany. The film culminates in 1938 with Anna trying to sue the surviving Romanovs, demanding that they recognize her as Anastasia but never revealing whether or not she is or isn't. The epilogue's narrator states that the court case ended in 1970, with Anna not being able to prove herself or to be disproven as the Grand Duchess, and that she eventually moved back to the United States and settled in Charlottesville, Virginia, where she died in 1984.

== Cast ==
- Amy Irving as Anna Anderson
- Olivia de Havilland as Dowager Empress Maria Feodorovna
- Rex Harrison as Grand Duke Cyril Romanov
- Jan Niklas as Prince Erich
- Nicolas Surovy as Serge Markov
- Susan Engel as Grand Duchess Olga
- Susan Lucci as Darya Romanoff
- Elke Sommer as Isabel Von Hohenstauffen
- Edward Fox as Dr. Hauser
- Claire Bloom as Tsarina Alexandra
- Omar Sharif as Tsar Nicholas II
- Jennifer Dundas as Grand Duchess Anastasia
- Christian Bale as Tsarevich Alexei
- Andrea Bretterbauer as Sonya Markov
- Sydney Bromley as Herbert
- Arnold Diamond as Dr. Markov
- Carol Gillies as Sasha
- Julian Glover as Colonel Eugene Kobylinsky
- Rachel Gurney as Grand Duchess Victoria. Gurney also played Czarina Alexandra in the BBC Radio 4 adaptation of 'Holiday in Spala' by Royce Ryton (broadcast on 25 July 1970).
- Betty Marsden as Princess Troubetskaya
- Tim McInnerny as Yakovlev
- Angela Pleasence as Clara
- Julia Koehler as one of the three sisters

== Awards ==
Year	Award	Category	Person	Result
1987	Artios	Best Casting for TV Miniseries'	Lynn Kressel	Nominated
1987	Primetime Emmy	Outstanding Achievement in Music Composition for a Miniseries or a Special (Dramatic Underscore)	Laurence Rosenthal	Won
1987	Primetime Emmy	Outstanding Costume Design for a Miniseries or a Special	Jane Robinson (costume designer)	Won
1987	Primetime Emmy	Outstanding Miniseries	Michael Lepiner; Kenneth Kaufman; Graham Cottle; Marvin J. Chomsky	Nominated
1987	Primetime Emmy	Outstanding Supporting Actress in a Miniseries or a Special	Olivia de Havilland	Nominated
1987	Golden Globe	Best Performance by an Actress in a Supporting Role in a Series, Mini-Series or Motion Picture Made for TV	Olivia de Havilland	Won
1987	Golden Globe	Best Performance by an Actor in a Supporting Role in a Series, Mini-Series or Motion Picture Made for TV	Jan Niklas	Won
1987	Golden Globe	Best Mini-Series or Motion Picture Made for TV		Nominated
1987	Golden Globe	Best Performance by an Actress in a Mini-Series or Motion Picture Made for TV	Amy Irving	Nominated

== See also ==
- Romanov impostors
- Ipatiev House
