= Eugene Kobylinsky =

Russian army officer, jailor of the Romanovs under the Provisional Government (1875-1927)

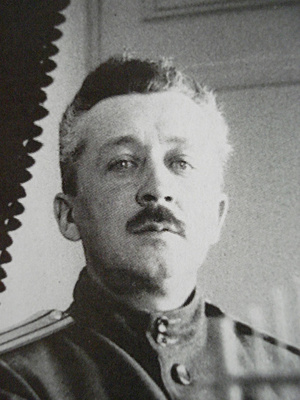
- Kobylinsky circa 1920
- Born: September 29 (October 11), 1875; Kyiv, Russian Empire
- Died: December 1927; Moscow, USSR
- Cause of death: Execution by firing squad

Colonel Eugene Kobylinsky (11 October [O.S. 29 September] 1875 – December 1927) was a Russian military officer who served as the commander of the special detachment at Tsarskoe Selo and Tobolsk in 1917–18, where he oversaw the imprisonment of former Russian Emperor Nicholas II, who abdicated his throne after the February Revolution of 1917.

== Biography ==
Eugene Stepanovich Kobylinsky (Russian: Евгений Степанович Кобылинский) was born into a noble family in Kiev on 11 October [O.S. 29 September] 1875. He graduated from the Cadet Corps military school.

On 14 January [O.S. 1 January] 1909 he became a lieutenant in the St. Petersburg Imperial Guard regiment. He served on the front lines in World War I and was decommissioned after sustaining major injuries.

After Russian Emperor Nicholas II abdicated the throne in February 1917, Kobylinsky became an employee of the Provisional Government which succeeded Nicholas. On 14 March [O.S. 1 March] 1917 Kobylinsky was appointed commandant of the Alexander Palace, where the former Russian Imperial Family was imprisoned. He attended the family and forty-five retainers when they departed for the city of Tobolsk in Siberia that August.

After the October Revolution later that year, a Bolshevik regime was established and Kobylinsky was replaced by Bolshevik officers, who employed a much stricter regime than he had.

During the Russian Civil War, Kobylinsky was invited to join the White Army in June 1918. He initially refused, but in December of that year enlisted as a White officer under the command of Admiral Aleksandr Kolchak, for whom he fought until he was captured near Krasnoyarsk the following December and sent to a concentration camp. In exchange for freedom, in September 1920 he joined the Red Army, eventually becoming its treasurer.

He was hired as an accountant by the Rybinsk County Bureau of Statistics in July 1921, and soon after married Claudia Bitner, a former tutor to the Imperial children from Tsarskoe Selo, with whom he had a son, Innokenty.

In 1926 a Tobolsk resident named Paulina Mežanc suggested during an interrogation that Kobylinsky was in possession of jewelry that once belonged to the Imperial family. An investigation was undertaken from June to September 1927. The alleged jewelry was never found, but Kobylinsky was revealed to have had connections to the White Army of Yugoslavia. He was sacked by his employer, charged with "monarchical conspiracy" against the Soviet state, and was killed by firing squad in Moscow, along with eight others, that December.
