= Jan Niklas =

German actor (born 1947)

- Born: 15 October 1947 (age 78); Munich, Bavaria, Germany
- Other name: Yan Nicklas
- Occupations: Film and television actor
- Years active: 1974–present
- Awards: Golden Globe Award for Best Supporting Actor; 1987 Anastasia: The Mystery of Anna
- Website: www.janniklas.com

Jan Niklas (born 15 October 1947) is a German film and television actor. He is best known for appearing in TV films such as Peter The Great, Anastasia: The Mystery of Anna and Anne Frank: The Whole Story. He won a Golden Globe Award for his appearance in the TV miniseries Anastasia: The Mystery of Anna. He also played in the Hungarian film Colonel Redl which was nominated for the Academy Award for Best Foreign Language Film.

== Early life ==
Jan Niklas was born on 15 October 1947 in Pottenstein, near Nuremberg, Germany. After attending boarding school in Britain, he took acting classes in London, then he completed three years of acting classes at the Max Reinhardt Academy in Berlin.

== Career ==
Niklas made his first television appearance on an episode of the German TV series Sonderdezernat K1 as Juniorchef. After playing in a couple of TV films and miniseries he slowly gained popularity. His breakthrough came in 1985, when he was cast in supporting role in István Szabó's war film Oberst Redl.

In 1986 he was cast to portray a young Peter the Great in the miniseries Peter the Great. A lot of newspapers and magazines stated that it was Niklas' performance that made the miniseries so believable, and the Miami Herald stated: "It’s Niklas’ vigorously effective portrayal of the younger Peter that hooks a viewer into caring about this legendary figure. Due to his energetic performance the first two parts of “Peter the Great” are the most absorbing". TV Guide stated that Niklas was the Discovery of the year in 1986.

Niklas received a Golden Globe nomination for Best Performance by an Actor in a Mini-Series or Motion Picture Made for Television, but lost to James Woods (Promise).

However, later that same year, his "style and flair" was recognized throughout the industry, and brought him to the historical drama Anastasia: The Mystery of Anna in which he portrayed Prince Erich. The Boston Globe called it "a performance worth remembering". Niklas won the Golden Globe Award for Best Performance by an Actor in a Supporting Role in a Series, Mini-Series or Motion Picture Made for Television for his performance.

After this, he appeared in films such as: The Rose Garden, Dr. M, Red Hot and The House of the Spirits. He stayed unnoticed for a while, until in 2001 he was cast as Fritz Pfeffer in the Emmy Award-winning miniseries Anne Frank: The Whole Story. This was, according to The Detroit News, "completely believable". His latest appearance was in the German film Die Zeit, die man Leben nennt.

== Filmography ==
Title	Year	Role	Notes
The Clown	1976	Leo Schnier	
The Formula	1980	Gestapo Captain	
Night Crossing	1982	Lt. Fehler	
Loose Connections	1983	Axel Hoffman	
Colonel Redl	1985	Kubinyi Kristof	
Peter the Great	1986	Young Peter the Great	4 episodes
Anastasia: The Mystery of Anna	1986	Prince Erich	2 episodes
The Rose Garden	1989	Paessler	
Dr. M	1990	Le lieutenant Claus Hartman	
Red Hot	1993	Yorgi	
The House of the Spirits	1993	Count de Satigny	
Tafelspitz	1993	Thomas Jefferson	
Blutige Spur	1995	Dr. Alexander West	TV film
Jezerní královna	1998	King Richard	
Assignment Berlin	1998	Hans Osler	
Tödliche Diamanten	1998	Pallavicini	TV film
Die Gottesanbeterin	2001	Ulrich Stein	
Anne Frank: The Whole Story	2001	Fritz Pfeffer	TV film
Plain Truth	2004	Aaron Fitch	TV film
Summer Solstice	2005	Oscar	TV film
Die Zeit, die man Leben nennt	2008	Jargonov	TV film, (final film role)

== Awards and nominations ==
=== Wins ===
- Golden Globe Award for Best Performance by an Actor in a Supporting Role in a Series, Mini-Series or Motion Picture Made for TV (for Anastasia: The Mystery of Anna)

=== Nominations ===
- Golden Globe Award for Best Performance by an Actor in a Mini-Series or Motion Picture Made for TV (for Peter the Great)
