= Serge Groussard =

French journalist (1920–2016)

- Born: 18 October 1920
- Died: 1 January 2016 (aged 95)
- Education: Sciences Po
- Occupations: Journalist, writer
- Writing career
- Language: French
- Notable awards: Officier de la Légion d'honneur; Croix de guerre 1939-1945; Médaille de la Résistance; Croix de la Valeur militaire; Chevalier des Arts et des Lettres

Serge Groussard (French pronunciation: [sɛʁʒ ɡʁusaʁ]; 18 January 1920 – 1 January 2016) was a French journalist and writer, the son of colonel Georges Groussard and Véra Bernstein-Woolbrunn.

== Biography ==
Serge Groussard studied at the Calvin Institute in Montauban, at the La Rochelle high school, and at the Lycée Gouraud in Rabat, Morocco. He later attended the Faculty of Arts and the Sciences Po, both in Paris.

In September 1939, he volunteered for the duration of the Second World War and participated as a pupil infantry officer in the fighting on the Loire. An information officer for the French Resistance, he was arrested in January 1943 by the Gestapo, sentenced to thirty years in prison, and deported to Germany. He recounted this experience in his first published work, Crépuscule des vivants, in 1946.

In 1953, Groussard was a military parachutist. From October 1956 to October 1957 and again in 1959, he served as lieutenant, then captain, in Algeria, to which he dedicated the narrative Écrivain.

He worked as a journalist for Le Figaro from 1954 to 1962 and for l'Aurore from 1962 to 1969.

== Selected works ==
Groussard wrote twenty-five books, including twenty novels, eight of which were adapted to film:

- Crépuscule des vivants (1946)
- Pogrom (1948)
- Solitude espagnole, Prix International du Grand-Reportage, Prix Claude Blanchard (1948)
- Des gens sans importance, Prix Populiste (1949) – adapted to film under the title People of No Importance by Henri Verneuil (1956)
- La Femme sans passé, Prix Femina (1950) – adapted to film under the title The Passerby by Henri Calef (1951)
- Talya (1951)
- Orage à Miami and L'Ancêtre (1954)
- Un officier de tradition (1954)
- Une chic fille, recueils de nouvelles, Grand Prix de la Nouvelle (1956)
- Demain est là (1956)
- La Belle espérance (1958)
- Quartier chinois (1958)
- La Passion du Maure (1960)
- Jeunesse sauvage (1960)
- Mektoub, Prix du roman populiste (1967)
- Tu es soleil (1970)
- Taxi de nuit (1971)
- L'Algérie des adieux (1972)
- La Médaille de sang (1973)
- La Guerre oubliée (1974)
- Les Cobras (1981)

== Honours ==
- Officier de la Légion d'honneur
- Croix de guerre 1939-1945
- Médaille de la Résistance
- Croix de la Valeur militaire
- Chevalier des Arts et des Lettres
