= List of Tim Curry performances =

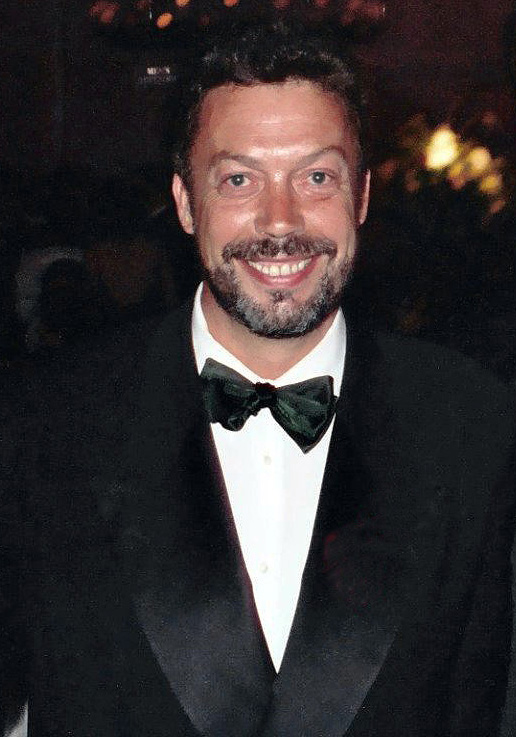
Curry at the 1995 Primetime Emmy Awards

Tim Curry (1946–2026) was a British actor and singer who had numerous roles in films, television shows, video games, and audiobooks.

Curry was perhaps best known for his portrayal of Dr. Frank-N-Furter in the stage musical The Rocky Horror Show (1973–1975) and its film adaptation The Rocky Horror Picture Show (1975). Other film credits are The Shout (1978), Times Square (1980), Annie (1982), Legend (1985), Clue (1985), The Hunt for Red October (1990), Oscar (1991), Home Alone 2: Lost in New York (1992), Loaded Weapon 1 (1993), The Three Musketeers (1993), The Shadow (1994), Congo (1995), Muppet Treasure Island (1996), Charlie's Angels (2000), Scary Movie 2 (2001), Kinsey (2004), and Burke & Hare (2010).

On stage, Curry was nominated for the Laurence Olivier Award for Best Actor in a Musical for his roles as The Pirate King in The Pirates of Penzance (1982) and King Arthur in Spamalot (2006–2007). On Broadway, he earned three Tony Award nominations, his first for Best Actor in a Play for his role as Wolfgang Amadeus Mozart in Amadeus (1980–1981) and followed by two nominations for Best Actor in a Musical for My Favorite Year (1992–1993) and Spamalot (2005). He also portrayed Tristan Tzara in the Tony Award winner for Best Play, Travesties (1975–1976).

On television, Curry portrayed Jerome in Three Men in a Boat (1975), William Shakespeare in Will Shakespeare (1978), Bill Sikes in Oliver Twist (1982), and Pennywise in It (1990). He also appeared in guest roles in popular series such as Play for Today (1974), Wiseguy (1989), Roseanne (1993), Tales from the Crypt (1993), for which he was nominated for a Primetime Emmy Award, Lexx (1997), Monk (2004), Will & Grace (2004), Psych (2007), Agatha Christie's Poirot (2008), Return to Cranford (2009), and Criminal Minds (2010). A noted voice artist, he was a Daytime Emmy Award winner and both a Annie Award and Grammy Award nominee for his vocal performances. Voice credits across a pleothra of media include Peter Pan & the Pirates (1990–1991), Ferngully: The Last Rainforest (1992), The Pebble and the Penguin (1995), The Wild Thornberrys (1998–2004), the English dub of The Cat Returns (2005), Brütal Legend (2009), Dragon Age: Origins (2009), and Star Wars: The Clone Wars (2012–2014).

He also released three rock-focused studio albums: Read My Lips (1978), Fearless (1979), and Simplicity (1981).

== Theatre ==
Year	Title	Role	Location
1968–1969	Hair	Woof / various roles	Shaftesbury Theatre, West End
1969	After Haggerty	Hippy	Aldwych Theatre, West End
1970	The Sport of My Mad Mother	Fak	Royal Court Theatre, London
1970	Lie Down I Think I Love You...	Peter	Strand Theatre, West End
1971	Titus Andronicus	Bassianus	Roundhouse Theatre, London
1971	The Baby Elephant	Jesse	Royal Court Theatre, London
1971	Man is Man	Sexton	Royal Court Theatre, London
1971	The White Devil	Camillo	Citizens Theatre, Glasgow
1971	Life of Galileo	Sagredo	Citizens Theatre, Glasgow
1971	The Maids	Solange	Citizens Theatre, Glasgow
1971	Loot	Meadows	Citizens Theatre, Glasgow
1971	Danton's Death	Lacroix	Citizens Theatre, Glasgow
1971–1972	Cinderella	Buttons	Citizens Theatre, Glasgow
1972	A Midsummer Night's Dream	Puck	Scottish Opera, Glasgow
1972	England's Ireland	Ensemble	Royal Court Theatre, London
1972	Time Off? Not a Ghost of a Chance	Ensemble	Sadler's Wells Theatre, London
1972–1973	Once Upon a Time	Tom Tom	Duke of York's Theatre, West End
1973	Give the Gaffers Time to Love You		Royal Court Theatre, London
1973	The Rocky Horror Show	Dr. Frank-N-Furter	Royal Court Theatre, London
1973	The Rocky Horror Show	Dr. Frank-N-Furter	Chelsea Classic Cinema, London
1974	The Rocky Horror Show	Dr. Frank-N-Furter	Roxy Theatre, Los Angeles
1975	The Rocky Horror Show	Dr. Frank-N-Furter	Belasco Theatre, Broadway
1975	Travesties	Tristan Tzara	Albery Theatre, West End
1975–1976	Travesties	Tristan Tzara	Ethel Barrymore Theatre, Broadway
1980	Amadeus	Wolfgang Amadeus Mozart	Washington National Theatre
1980–1981	Amadeus	Wolfgang Amadeus Mozart	Broadhurst Theatre, Broadway
1982	The Pirates of Penzance	The Pirate King	Drury Lane, West End
1983–1984	The Rivals	Bob Acres	Royal National Theatre, London
1985–1986	Love for Love	Tattle	Royal National Theatre, London
1986	Love for Love	Tattle	Burgtheater, Vienna
1986	The Threepenny Opera	Macheath / Mack the Knife	Royal National Theatre, London
1986	Dalliance	Theodore	Royal National Theatre, London
1987–1988	Me and My Girl	Bill Snibson	North American Tour
1989–1990	The Art of Success	William Hogarth	New York City Center, Off-Broadway
1990	The Wall – Live in Berlin	The Prosecutor	Potsdamer Platz, Berlin
1991	Love Letters	Andy	Beverly Canon Theatre, Los Angeles
1992–1993	My Favorite Year	Alan Swann	Vivian Beaumont Theater, Broadway
2001	A Christmas Carol	Ebenezer Scrooge	Theater at Madison Square Garden, New York City
2004–2005	Spamalot	King Arthur	Bank of America Theatre, Chicago
2005	Spamalot	King Arthur	Shubert Theatre, Broadway
2006–2007	Spamalot	King Arthur	Palace Theatre, West End
2011	Rosencrantz and Guildenstern Are Dead	The Player	Chichester Festival Theatre
2012	What About Dick?	Reverend Whoopsie, Lord Darling	Orpheum Theatre, Los Angeles

== Live-action roles ==
=== Film ===
Year	Title	Role	Director	Notes
1975	The Rocky Horror Picture Show	Dr. Frank-N-Furter	Jim Sharman	
1978	The Shout	Robert Graves	Jerzy Skolimowski	
1980	Times Square	Johnny LaGuardia	Allan Moyle	
1982	Annie	Rooster Hannigan	John Huston	
1983	The Ploughman's Lunch	Jeremy Hancock	Richard Eyre	
1985	Legend	Darkness	Ridley Scott	
1985	Clue	Wadsworth	Jonathan Lynn	
1987	Pass the Ammo	Rev. Ray Porter	David Beaird	
1990	The Hunt for Red October	Dr. Yevgeniy Petrov	John McTiernan	
1991	Oscar	Dr. Thornton Poole	John Landis	
1992	The Player	Himself	Robert Altman	Deleted cameo
1992	Passed Away	Boyd Pinter	Charlie Peters	
1992	Home Alone 2: Lost in New York	Mr. Hector	Chris Columbus	
1993	Loaded Weapon 1	Mr. Jigsaw	Gene Quintano	
1993	The Three Musketeers	Cardinal Richelieu	Stephen Herek	
1994	The Shadow	Farley Claymore	Russell Mulcahy	
1995	Congo	Herkermer Homolka	Frank Marshall	
1995	Lover's Knot	Cupid's Caseworker	Peter Shaner	
1996	Muppet Treasure Island	Long John Silver	Brian Henson	
1997	McHale's Navy	Major Vladikov	Bryan Spicer	
1998	Addams Family Reunion	Gomez Addams	Dave Payne	Direct-to-video
1999	Pirates of the Plain	Jezebel Jack	John R. Cherry III	Direct-to-video
2000	Four Dogs Playing Poker	Felix	Paul Rachman	Direct-to-video
2000	Sorted	Damien Kemp	Alexander Jovy	
2000	Charlie's Angels	Roger Corwin	McG	
2001	Scary Movie 2	Professor Oldman	Keenen Ivory Wayans	
2001	Wolf Girl	Harley Dune	Thom Fitzgerald	Direct-to-video
2002	Ritual	Matthew Hope	Avi Nesher	Direct-to-video
2002	The Scoundrel's Wife	Father Antoine	Glen Pitre	
2004	Kinsey	Thurman Rice	Bill Condon	
2005	Bailey's Billion$	Caspar Pennington	David Devine	
2007	Christmas in Wonderland	Gordon McLoosh	James Orr	
2008	The Secret of Moonacre	Coeur de Noir / Sir William de Noir	Gábor Csupó	
2010	Burke & Hare	Prof. Alexander Monro	John Landis	
2021	Pennywise: The Story of It	Himself	John Campopiano & Christopher Griffiths	Documentary
2025	Strange Journey: The Story of Rocky Horror	Himself	Linus O’Brien	Documentary
TBA	Untitled Tim Curry Documentary	Himself	Peter Ferriero	Documentary; posthumous release

=== Television ===
Year	Title	Role	Notes
1968	Sinking Fish Move Sideways	Waiter on Train	Television film
1970	Ace of Wands	Cashier	Episode: "Now You See It, Now You Don't: Part 1"
1970	ITV Saturday Night Theatre	Crosscapel	Episode: "The Policeman and the Cook"
1972	Stage 2	Madman	Episode: "The Duchess of Malfi"
1973	Armchair Theatre	Mik	Episode: "Verite"
1974	Napoleon and Love	Eugene	3 episodes
1974	Play for Today	Glen	Episode: "Schmoedipus"
1975	Three Men in a Boat	Jerome	Television film
1977	Rock Follies of '77	Stevie Streeter	Episode: "The Band Who Wouldn't Die"
1978	Will Shakespeare	William Shakespeare	6 episodes
1978	ITV Sunday Night Drama	Leonard Brazil	Episode: "City Sugar"
1981	Saturday Night Live	Himself	Host; episode: "Tim Curry/Meat Loaf"
1982	Oliver Twist	Bill Sikes	Television film
1983	Video Stars	Teddy Whazz	Television film
1985	Blue Money	Larry Gormley	Television film
1985	Ligmalion: A Musical for the 80s	Eden Rothwell Esq.	Television film
1986	The Worst Witch	The Grand Wizard	Television film
1989	The Tracey Ullman Show	Ian Miles	Episode: #3.11
1989	Wiseguy	Winston Newquay	6 episodes
1990	It	It / Pennywise the Dancing Clown / Robert "Bob" Gray	2 episodes
1991	Big Deals	Christopher Nizzle	Pilot
1992	Topper	Cosmo Topper	Pilot
1993	Roseanne	Roger	2 episodes
1993	Tales from the Crypt	Pa / Ma / Winona Brackett	Episode: "Death of Some Salesman"
1994	51st Golden Globe Awards	Himself	Co-host; television special
1994	Earth 2	Gaal	4 episodes
1995–1996	The Naked Truth	Sir Rudolph Haley	2 episodes
1996	Titanic	Simon Doonan	2 episodes
1997	Lexx	Poet Man	Episode: "Supernova"
1997	Over the Top	Simon Ferguson	12 episodes; also producer
1997	Doom Runners	Dr. Kao	Television film
1998	Madness Reigns	King Nicholas	Pilot
1999–2000	Rude Awakening	Martin Crisp	6 episodes
1999	The Unbelievables	Vaudevillian	Pilot
1999	Jackie's Back	Edward Whatsett St. John	Television film
2000	Bette	Himself	Episode: "Or Not to Be"
2001	Attila	Theodosius II	2 episodes
2002–2003	Family Affair	Mr. Giles French	15 episodes
2004	Monk	Dale "The Whale" Biederbeck	Episode: "Mr. Monk Goes to Jail"
2004	Will & Grace	Marion Finster	2 episodes
2007	Psych	Nigel St. Nigel	Episode: "American Duos"
2008	Terry Pratchett's The Colour of Magic	Trymon	2 episodes
2008	Starz Inside: Ladies or Gentlemen	Himself	Documentary
2008	Agatha Christie's Poirot	Lord Greville Boynton	Episode: "Appointment with Death"
2009	Alice	Dodo	Episode #1.1
2009	Return to Cranford	Signor Brunoni	Episode: "Part Two: October 1844"
2010	Criminal Minds	Billy Flynn	2 episodes
2016	The Rocky Horror Picture Show: Let's Do the Time Warp Again	The Criminologist	Television film

=== Video games ===
Year	Title	Role	Ref.
1995	Frankenstein: Through the Eyes of the Monster	Doctor Victor Frankenstein	
1996	Muppet Treasure Island	Long John Silver	
2008	Command & Conquer: Red Alert 3	Premier Anatoly Cherdenko	

=== Music videos ===
Year	Title	Role
1979	"I Do the Rock"	Himself
1979	"Paradise Garage"	Himself

== Voice roles ==
=== Voice roles in film ===
Year	Title	Role	Notes
1992	FernGully: The Last Rainforest	Hexxus	
1995	The Pebble and the Penguin	Drake	
1997	Beauty and the Beast: The Enchanted Christmas	Forte	Direct-to-video
1997	A Christmas Carol	Ebenezer Scrooge	Direct-to-video
1998	The Rugrats Movie	Rex Pester	
1998	The Easter Story Keepers	Nero	Direct-to-video
1999	Scooby-Doo! and the Witch's Ghost	Ben Ravencroft	Direct-to-video
1999	Bartok the Magnificent	The Skull	Direct-to-video
2000	Lion of Oz	Captain Fitzgerald	Direct-to-video
2000	Rugrats in Paris: The Movie	Sumo Singer	
2001	Barbie in the Nutcracker	Mouse King	Direct-to-video
2002	I, Crocodile	Crocodile	Short film
2002	The Wild Thornberrys Movie	Nigel Thornberry / Col. Radcliff Thornberry	
2003	Rugrats Go Wild	Nigel Thornberry	
2005	¡Mucha Lucha!: The Return of El Maléfico	El Maléfico	Direct-to-video
2005	The Cat Returns	The Cat King	English dub
2005	Valiant	Von Talon	
2006	Garfield: A Tail of Two Kitties	Prince	
2006	Queer Duck: The Movie	Peccary	Direct-to-video
2006	A Sesame Street Christmas Carol	Narrator	Direct-to-video
2007	The Chosen One	Lucifer	Direct-to-video
2007	Once Upon a Christmas Village	Sir Evil	Short film
2008	Fly Me to the Moon	Yegor	
2008	Scooby-Doo! and the Goblin King	Goblin King	Direct-to-video
2009	Curious George 2: Follow That Monkey!	Picadilly	Direct-to-video
2009	Mythic Journeys	The King	Documentary
2009	Barbie and the Three Musketeers	Philippe	Direct-to-video
2010	The North Star	Narrator	Short film
2010	A Turtle's Tale: Sammy's Adventures	Fluffy	
2011	The Voyages of Young Doctor Dolittle	Doctor Dolittle	Direct-to-video
2012	The Outback	Blacktooth	
2012	Back to the Sea	Eric	
2012	Strange Frame	Dorlan Mig	
2013	Gingerclown	Gingerclown	
2013	Saving Santa	Nevil Baddington	Direct-to-video
2014	Axel: The Biggest Little Hero	Papa Qi	Direct-to-video
2014	Ribbit	Terence	
2017	Long Drive Home	Monster Head AD	Short film
2020	Dagon: Troll World Chronicles	Necrofer the Death Bringer	Unreleased
2024	Stream	Lockwood	Cameo
TBA	Stream 2: Sudden Death †	Lockwood	Posthumous release

=== Voice roles in television ===
Year	Title	Role	Notes
1988–1989	The Greatest Adventure: Stories from the Bible	The Serpent / Judas Iscariot	2 episodes
1989	Long Ago and Far Away	Abel	Episode: "Abel's Island"
1989	Paddington Bear	Mr. Curry	13 episodes
1989	Fantastic Max	Dermot D. McDermott	Episode: "Rats Like Us"
1990	Gravedale High	Mr. Tutner	3 episodes
1990	The Adventures of Don Coyote and Sancho Panda	Sultan	Episode: "A Knight in Arabia"
1990–1991	Fox's Peter Pan & the Pirates	Captain Hook	46 episodes
1990–1991	Wake, Rattle & Roll	Ronald Chump	28 episodes
1990	Tiny Toon Adventures	Prince Charles / Reginald	Episode: "Europe in 30 Minutes"
1990	The Marzipan Pig	Narrator	Television film
1990	TaleSpin	Thaddeus E. Klang	2 episodes
1991–1992	Tom & Jerry Kids	Sheriff of Rottingham / Banker	2 episodes
1991–1992	Darkwing Duck	Taurus Bulba	3 episodes
1991–1993	The Pirates of Dark Water	Konk	20 episodes
1991–1994	The Legend of Prince Valiant	Sir Gawain	39 episodes
1991–1996	Captain Planet and the Planeteers	MAL	26 episodes
1992	Fish Police	Sharkster	6 episodes
1992	Defenders of Dynatron City	Atom Ed	Pilot
1992	Capitol Critters	Senator	Episode: "Max Goes to Washington"
1992	Wild West C.O.W.-Boys of Moo Mesa	Barney "Jacques La Beef" Finkleberg	Episode: "A Snake in Cow's Clothing"
1992	Batman: The Animated Series	Henchman	Episodes: "Fear of Victory"
1992	Liquid Television	The Snake	Segment: "Meggamorphosis"
1992	The Steadfast Tin Soldier	Jack-in-the-Box	Television film
1992	Eek! The Cat	Narrator	Episode: "It's A Wonderful Nine Lives"
1992–1994	Dinosaurs	Various roles	7 episodes
1992–1994	The Little Mermaid	Evil Manta	4 episodes
1993–1994	Mighty Max	Skullmaster / Jules Verne	12 episodes
1994–1997	Aaahh!!! Real Monsters	Zimbo / additional characters	19 episodes
1994–1997	Duckman	King Chicken / Simon Desmond	10 episodes
1994	Sonic the Hedgehog	King Acorn / Keeper of the Time Stones	4 episodes
1994	Aladdin	Amok Mon-Ra / Caliph Kapok	2 episodes
1994–1995	Superhuman Samurai Syber-Squad	Kilokahn	53 episodes
1994–1995	Turbocharged Thunderbirds	The Atrocimator	13 episodes
1995–1997	The Mask: Animated Series	Pretorius	14 episodes
1995	Daisy-Head Mayzie	Finagle	Television film
1995–1996	Gargoyles	Dr. Anton Sevarius	7 episodes
1996	Adventures from the Book of Virtues	King Minos / Gessler	2 episodes
1996	Quack Pack	Moltoc	2 episodes
1996	The Story of Santa Claus	Nostros	Television film
1996–1997	Mighty Ducks	Lord Dragaunus	21 episodes
1996–1997	Bruno the Kid	Lazlo Gigahurtz	9 episodes
1996–1998	Jumanji	Trader Slick	18 episodes
1997	Freakazoid!	Dr. Mystico	Episode: "Island of Dr. Mystico"
1997	Casper	Pianist	Episode: "Stinkie Time Theatre"
1997	Teen Angel	The Frog	Episode: "Jeremiah Was a Bullfrog"
1998	Stories from My Childhood	The Beast	Episode: "Beauty and the Beast (A Tale of the Crimson Flower)"
1998	Where on Earth Is Carmen Sandiego?	Dr. Gunnar Maelstrom	3 episodes
1998	The Net	The Sorcerer	10 episodes
1998	The First Snow of Winter	Voley	Television film
1998–2000	Voltron: The Third Dimension	Prince Lotor / King Alfor	23 episodes
1998–2004	The Wild Thornberrys	Nigel Thornberry / Col. Radcliff Thornberry / additional characters	92 episodes
1999, 2003–2004	Hey Arnold!	Leichliter	3 episodes
1999	Xyber 9: New Dawn	King Renard	18 episodes
1999, 2001	Big Guy and Rusty the Boy Robot	Dr. Neugog	2 episodes
1999	Recess	Dr. Slicer	Episode: "Prickly is Leaving"
1999	Johnny Bravo	Big Brother	Episode: "Brave New Johnny"
1999	Pinky, Elmyra & the Brain	Monkman	Episode: "Teleport a Friend"
1999	The Titanic Chronicles	Officer Lightoller	Television film
2000	Martial Law	The One	3 episodes
2000	Batman Beyond	Mutro Botha	Episode: "Final Cut"
2000	100 Deeds for Eddie McDowd	The Rottweiler	Episode: "Big Dog"
2000	The New Woody Woodpecker Show	Nicky Knickknacker	Episode: "Eenie, Meany, Out You Go!"
2000–2001	Redwall	Slagar the Cruel	13 episodes
2001	Gary & Mike	Jared Wexler	Episode: "Crisscross"
2001	Teacher's Pet	Spooky	Episode: "The Tale of the Telltale Taffy"
2002–2003	Teamo Supremo	Laser Pirate / Dastardly Dentist	3 episodes
2002	Samurai Jack	Worm 1	Episode: "Jack Tales"
2002	Ozzy & Drix	Nick O'Teen / Scarlet Fever	2 episodes
2003–2005	The Adventures of Jimmy Neutron: Boy Genius	Professor Finbarr Calamitous	6 episodes
2003	K10C: Kids' Ten Commandments	Hazzaka	Episode: "The Not-So-Golden Calf"
2003	Chalkzone	Jacko	2 episodes
2003	The Proud Family	Pervical	Episode: "The Good, the Bad, and the Ugly"
2004	Higglytown Heroes	Librarian Hero	2 episodes
2004	Bench Pressly	Prawnda	Pilot
2005	Duck Dodgers	Magnificent Rogue	Episode: "Villainstruck"
2005	Loonatics Unleashed	Ringmaster	Episode: "The World is My Circus"
2006	The Jimmy Timmy Power Hour 2: When Nerds Collide	Professor Finbarr Calamitous	Television film
2006	Eloise: The Animated Series	Mr. Salamone	13 episodes
2008, 2012	Phineas and Ferb	Stubbings / Worthington Dubois	2 episodes
2008	Ben 10: Alien Force	Dr. Joseph Chadwick / Knight #2	Episode: "Pet Project"
2010	Regular Show	Hot Dog Leader / Master Prank Caller #2	2 episodes
2012–2013	Young Justice	G. Gordon Godfrey	8 episodes
2012	Transformers: Rescue Bots	Doctor Morocco	4 episodes
2012	The High Fructose Adventures of Annoying Orange	Arugula / Endive / Plum	2 episodes
2012–2014	Randy Cunningham: 9th Grade Ninja	The Sorcerer	21 episodes
2012–2014	Star Wars: The Clone Wars	Chancellor Palpatine/Darth Sidious	10 episodes
2013	Wonder Pets	Tin Man	Episode: "In the Land of Oz"
2013	Ben 10: Omniverse	Dr. Joseph Chadwick / Stage Manager	Episode: "Return to Forever"
2014	Over the Garden Wall	Auntie Whispers	Episode: "The Ringing of the Bell"
2026	Barbie in the Nutcracker	Rat King Father	Netflix special; posthumous release

=== Voice roles in video games ===
Year	Title	Role	Ref.
1993	Gabriel Knight: Sins of the Fathers	Gabriel Knight	
1994	Wing Commander III: Heart of the Tiger	Melek	
1996	Toonstruck	Count Nefarious	
1997	Duckman: The Graphic Adventures of a Private Dick	King Chicken	
1999	Gabriel Knight 3: Blood of the Sacred, Blood of the Damned	Gabriel Knight	
2000	Sacrifice	Stratos	
2000	The Wild Thornberrys: Rambler	Nigel Thornberry	
2002	The Wild Thornberrys Movie	Nigel Thornberry	
2002	Scooby-Doo! Night of 100 Frights	The Mastermind	
Cancelled	The Four Horsemen of the Apocalypse	Satan	
2003	Rugrats Go Wild	Nigel Thornberry	
2003	The Adventures of Jimmy Neutron Boy Genius: Jet Fusion	Professor Finbarr Calamitous	
2004	Lemony Snicket's A Series of Unfortunate Events	Lemony Snicket	
2005	Nicktoons Unite!	Professor Finbarr Calamitous	
2007	Nicktoons: Attack of the Toybots	Professor Finbarr Calamitous	
2009	Brütal Legend	Emperor Doviculus	
2009	Dragon Age: Origins	Arl Rendon Howe	

=== Radio ===
Year	Title	Role	Notes
1985, 1987	The Wordsmiths at Gorsemere	Lord Biro	BBC Radio 4; 10 episodes
2000	Tales from the Crypt	Narrator	Episode: "Tight Grip"

=== Theme park attraction ===
Year	Title	Role	Venue
1994–2003	ExtraTERRORestrial Alien Encounter	S.I.R.	Magic Kingdom

=== Audiobooks ===
Year	Title
1983	Story Teller: The Happy Prince & Stolen Thunder
1991	The Old Contemptibles
1992	The Man with a Load of Mischief
1992	The Anodyne Necklace
1992	The Old Silent
1992	Home Alone 2: Lost in New York
1993	The Horse You Came in On
1993	Nightmares & Dreamscapes: Crouch End & The Doctor's Case
1993	Night Over Water
1993	The Dirty Duck
1993	Jewels
1993	A Dangerous Fortune
1994	Taltos
1995	Cry to Heaven
1995	The Island of the Day Before
1995	Rainbow's End
1995	Foucault's Pendulum
1995	The Silver Lining: A Collection of Poems: "Little Boy Blue"
1996	Anything Considered
1997	The Case Has Altered
1998	Belladonna
1999	Dune: House Atreides
2000	Mr. Phillips
2000	Dune: House Harkonnen
2000	Dinosaur: Disney's Storyteller Series
2001	Dune: House Corrino
2001	Morgan's Run
2001	Music of Spheres
2001	The Bad Beginning
2001	The Reptile Room
2002	Sabriel
2002	Lirael
2003	Abhorsen
2003	The Ersatz Elevator
2003	The Vile Village
2004	The Hostile Hospital
2005	The Carnivorous Carnival
2005	The Slippery Slope
2005	The Grim Grotto
2005	The Penultimate Peril
2006	The End
2006	Peter Pan
2006	Peter Pan in Scarlet
2008	Not in the Flesh
2010	Portobello
2010	Despicable Me: The Junior Novel
2010	A Christmas Carol
2011	A Journey to the Center of the Earth
2012	Dracula
2025	Vagabond: A Memoir

== Discography ==
Albums

- Read My Lips (1978)
- Fearless (1979)
- Simplicity (1981)
- The Best of Tim Curry (1985; compilation album)
- From the Vaults (2010; recorded 1976)

Soundtracks and cast recordings

- The Rocky Horror Show (Original London cast) (1973)
- The Rocky Horror Show (Original Roxy cast) (1974)
- The Rocky Horror Picture Show (1975)
- Annie (1982)
- FernGully: The Last Rainforest (1992)
- My Favorite Year (Original Broadway cast) (1993)
- The Pebble and the Penguin (1995)
- Muppet Treasure Island (1996)
- Beauty and the Beast: The Enchanted Christmas (1997)
- Spamalot (Original Broadway cast) (2005)
- The Rocky Horror Picture Show: Let's Do the Time Warp Again (2016)

Others

- Carly Simon – Spy (1979) – Backing vocals for "Vengeance" and "Pure Sin"
- Roger Waters – The Wall – Live in Berlin (1990) – Live recording of "The Trial"
- Little Tramp (1992) – Concept album for musical
- Disney's Music from the Park (1996) – "The Ballad of Davy Crockett"
- Sondheim: A Celebration 1997 AIDS Charity Benefit Cast (1997) – Live recording of "Losing My Mind"
