= Bette Sussman =

American singer

- Born: Rockaway, New Jersey
- Occupations: Television, composer, singer, songwriter

Bette Sussman is an American television composer, singer, songwriter, pianist, and musical director.

== Biography ==
=== Early life ===
Sussman was musically inspired by her mother and older sister, Sue. After her mother signed her up for piano lessons at age four, she studied classical music till she graduated from high school, after which she attended the Oberlin College Conservatory. When she had finished her first year, she moved to New York City, and studied with late jazz musician Sanford Gold, at age eighteen.

=== Career ===
When she was nineteen years old, she began her work as a musical director with a touring production of Godspell. By chance, Dick Wagner met her, and introduced her to Tim Curry. She played on Curry's Fearless album and also embarked on her first major world tour with him. She would later work as a musical director and a pianist for music artists such as Cissy Houston, Sarah Dash, Esther Marrow and Patti Austin, with whom she recorded a live album from the Bottom Line in NYC.

Sussman toured with Whitney Houston, Cissy Houston's daughter, in 1990, and played on Houston's version of the Dolly Parton classic "I Will Always Love You" for The Bodyguard: Original Soundtrack Album. Their version was a soundtrack success and sold over 17 million copies.

Sussman's friend, award-winning composer and lyricist Marc Shaiman, got her in touch with Bette Midler later that same year. She and Midler then worked together for several years and embarked on a tour together in 2003. Sussman has also worked with Aretha Franklin and Dean Friedman.

In television, she performed on the soundtrack for the song "Christmastime for the Jews" in the 2005 Jack Black/Neil Young episode of Saturday Night Live. She also worked as a composer on the award winning daytime drama series, One Life to Live, from 1999 to 2000, and As the World Turns, for which she has garnered two Daytime Emmy Award wins and six nominations.

=== Personal life ===
In her spare time, she studies with jazz musician Garry Dial, and plays with the R&B band, the Bev Leslies. She is friends with bassist Will Lee, by whom she is nicknamed "Skeezer".

== Awards and nominations ==
Daytime Emmy Awards:

- Nominated, 2000, Outstanding Achievement in Music Direction and Composition for a Drama Series for: As the World Turns
- Won, 2000, Outstanding Achievement in Music Direction and Composition for a Drama Series for: One Life to Live
- Nominated, 2002, Outstanding Achievement in Music Direction and Composition for a Drama Series for: One Life to Live
- Nominated, 2002, Outstanding Achievement in Music Direction and Composition for a Drama Series for: As the World Turns
- Nominated, 2003, Outstanding Achievement in Music Direction and Composition for a Drama Series for: As the World Turns
- Nominated, 2004, Outstanding Achievement in Music Direction and Composition for a Drama Series for: One Life to Live
- Won, 2005, Outstanding Achievement in Music Direction and Composition for a Drama Series for: One Life to Live
- Nominated, 2006, Outstanding Achievement in Music Direction and Composition for a Drama Series for: One Life to Live
