= Jewels (miniseries) =

- 2005 DVD cover
- Based on: Jewels by Danielle Steel
- Written by: Shelley List; Jonathan Estrin
- Directed by: Roger Young
- Starring: Annette O'Toole; Anthony Andrews; Jürgen Prochnow
- Music by: Patrick Williams
- Country of origin: United States
- Original language: English
- No. of episodes: 2

Production
- Producers: Shelley List; Jonathan Estrin
- Editor: Benjamin A. Weissman
- Running time: 228 minutes
- Production companies: List Estrin Productions; NBC Productions

Original release
- Network: NBC
- Release: October 18 – October 20, 1992

Jewels is a 1992 NBC television miniseries based on the bestselling 1992 Danielle Steel novel of the same name. Starring Annette O'Toole and Anthony Andrews, it was broadcast in two parts on October 18 and 20, 1992. The miniseries was adapted by Shelley List and Jonathan Estrin and directed by Roger Young. Jewels and its cast and crew were nominated for two Golden Globe Awards and a Primetime Emmy Award.

== Cast ==
- Annette O'Toole as Sarah Thompson Whitfield
- Anthony Andrews as William Whitfield
- Jürgen Prochnow as Joachim von Mannheim
- Corinne Touzet as Emanuelle
- Ursula Howells as the Duchess
- Sheila Gish as Victoria Thompson
- Simon Oates as Edward Thompson
- Robert Wagner as Charles Davenport
- Bradley Cole as Freddie Van Peering
- Christopher Villiers as Phillip
- David Thwaites as Phillip, age 16
- Benedict Taylor as Julian
- Chloë Annett as Isabelle

== Production ==
Jewels was adapted from the bestselling Danielle Steel novel of the same name by Shelley List and Jonathan Estrin, who also served as executive producers. Directed by Roger Young, the miniseries was filmed in Luxembourg.

== Broadcast and reception ==
The five-hour miniseries was broadcast in two parts on October 18 and 20, 1992. Tony Scott of Variety called it "overblown" and wrote that "Jewels barely reaches above pulp". Finding O'Toole, Andrews and Prochnow unremarkable, Scott complimented Villiers' and Taylor's "surprising vitality" as the Whitfield sons and also praised Howells, Gish and Oates as William and Sarah's parents.

== Award nominations ==
Jewels was nominated for a Golden Globe Award for Best Mini-Series or Motion Picture Made for TV and Andrews was nominated for a Golden Globe for Best Performance by an Actor in a Mini-Series or Motion Picture Made for TV. Composer Patrick Williams won a Primetime Emmy Award for Outstanding Individual Achievement in Music Composition for a Miniseries or a Special for Part I.
