= Jimmy Maelen =

American percussionist (1940–1988)

- Born: March 26, 1940
- Died: January 14, 1988 (aged 47)
- Occupation: Percussionist

Jimmy Maelen (born March 26, 1940 – January 14, 1988) was an American percussionist from the 1960s to 1980s, who worked with many artists including Roxy Music, Bryan Ferry, Peter Gabriel, James Taylor, Dire Straits, Barry Manilow, Alice Cooper, Kiss, Madonna, Bryan Adams, Michael Jackson, Mick Jagger, David Bowie and John Lennon. He also played on hit records by Bob James, Duran Duran, Carly Simon, Barbra Streisand, Yoko Ono, Meatloaf, Alice Cooper, BJ Thomas, and many others.

Maelen worked with Michael Barbiero and John Luongo and overdubbing on Gonzales' "I Haven't Stopped Dancin' Yet", The Jacksons' "Blame It on the Boogie" and "Shake Your Body (Down to the Ground)", Dan Hartman's "Vertigo/Relight My Fire", Jackie Moore's "This Time Baby". He can be heard playing seven tracks of percussion on Barry Manilow's classic hit "Copacabana". As a percussionist, he also appeared on the album, Desire Wire, made from 1978, done by Cindy Bullens. His working relationship with Barbiero and Luongo led to a solo album for Epic/Columbia in 1980, produced by the trio and entitled Beats Workin'.

Maelen toured with Peter Gabriel on his first solo tour in 1977. He contributed to Roxy Music's critically acclaimed final album Avalon and appeared with Bryan Ferry at Live Aid in London in 1985. Also in 1985 he performed on the Dire Straits Brothers in Arms album.

Maelen worked as a studio musician on Alphaville's 1986 album, Afternoons in Utopia. At the time of his death he was producing his first rock band Cherri Red, along with Gary Chester at the Edison Recording Studio in New York City. Subsequently, one of the songs "Be With You Tonight" which was written by John Bussi, was used in the film See You in the Morning directed by Alan J. Pakula.

Jimmy Maelen died of leukemia on January 14, 1988. He was 47 years old.

== Discography ==
Solo album

- Beats Workin' (1980)

With Bryan Adams

- You Want It You Got It (A&M, 1981)

With Peter Allen

- I Could Have Been a Sailor (A&M, 1979)

With Alphaville

- Afternoons in Utopia (Atlantic, 1986)

With Blood, Sweat & Tears

- No Sweat (Columbia, 1973)

With Irene Cara

- Anyone Can See (Network, 1982)

With Desmond Child

- Desmond Child & Rouge (Capitol, 1979)

With Linda Clifford

- I'll Keep on Loving You (Capitol, 1982)

With Jude Cole

- Jude Cole (Reprise Records, 1987)

With Tim Curry

- Read My Lips (A&M, 1978)
- Fearless (A&M, 1979)
- Simplicity (A&M, 1981)

With Ron Dante

- Street Angel (Handshake Records, 1981)

With Mink DeVille

- Coup de Grâce (Atlantic, 1981)

With Karla DeVito

- Is This a Cool World or What? (Epic, 1981)

With Dion DiMucci

- Return of the Wanderer (Lifesong, 1978)

With Duran Duran

- Notorious (EMI, 1986)

With Bryan Ferry

- Boys and Girls (E.G., 1985)

With Roberta Flack

- Blue Lights in the Basement (Atlantic, 1977)

With Peter Gabriel

- Peter Gabriel (Atco, 1977)

With Gloria Gaynor

- Experience Gloria Gaynor (MGM, 1975)
- Glorious (Polydor, 1977)

With Debbie Gibson

- Out of the Blue (Atlantic, 1987)

With Steve Goodman

- Say It in Private (Asylum Records, 1977)

With Amy Grant

- Never Alone (Myrrh, 1980)

With Henry Gross

- Show Me to the Stage (Lifesong, 1977)
- Love Is the Stuff (Lifesong, 1978)

With Gwen Guthrie

- Portrait (Island, 1983)
- Good to Go Lover (Polydor, 1986)

With Hall & Oates

- X-Static (RCA, 1979)
- Private Eyes (RCA, 1981)

With Dan Hartman

- Relight My Fire (Blue Sky, 1979)

With Tramaine Hawkins

- The Search Is Over (A&M, 1986)

With Loleatta Holloway

- Love Sensation (Goldon Mind, 1980)

With Janis Ian

- Janis Ian (Columbia Records, 1978)
- Night Rains (Columbia Records, 1979)

With Paul Jabara

- Paul Jabara & Friends (Columbia, 1983)

With Garland Jeffreys

- Escape Artist (Epic, 1981)
- Guts for Love (Epic, 1983)

With Al Johnson

- Peaceful (Marina Records, 1978)

With Kiss

- Love Gun (Casablanca, 1977)

With Ben E. King

- Save the Last Dance for Me (EMI, 1987)

With Gladys Knight & the Pips

- Still Together (Buddah, 1977)
- The One and Only (Buddah, 1978)

With Kool & the Gang

- Something Special (De-Lite, 1981)
- As One (De-Lite, 1982)
- Emergency (De-Lite, 1984)

With John Lennon and Yoko Ono

- Milk and Honey (Polydor, 1984)

With O'Donel Levy

- Windows (Groove Merchant, 1976)

With Nils Lofgren

- Wonderland (MCA, 1983)

With Barry Manilow

- Barry Manilow (Bell, 1973)
- Tryin' to Get the Feeling (Arista, 1975)
- Even Now (Arista, 1978)
- Barry (Arista, 1980)

With Barry Mann

- Lay It Out (CBS, 1971)

With Jimmy McGriff

- The Mean Machine (Groove Merchant, 1976)
- Red Beans (Groove Merchant, 1976)
- Tailgunner (LRC, 1977)

With Frankie Miller

- Dancing in the Rain (Mercury, 1986)

With Stephanie Mills

- If I Were Your Woman (MCA, 1987)

With Laura Nyro

- Smile (Columbia, 1976)

With Odyssey

- I Got the Melody (RCA, 1981)
- Happy Together (RCA, 1982)

With Yoko Ono

- It's Alright (I See Rainbows) (Rykodisc, 1982)

With Tony Orlando and Dawn

- Tuneweaving (Bell, 1973)

With Tony Orlando

- Tony Orlando (Elektra, 1978)

With Leslie Pearl

- Words & Music (RCA, 1982)

With The Pointer Sisters

- Hot Together (RCA Records, 1986)

With Lou Rawls

- Shades of Blue (Philadelphia, 1981)

With The Ritchie Family

- Bad Reputation (Casablanca, 1979)

With Vicki Sue Robinson

- Vicki Sue Robinson (RCA Victor, 1976)

With Roxy Music

- Avalon (Polydor, 1982)

With Jennifer Rush

- Heart over Mind (CBS, 1987)

With Helen Schneider

- Let It Be Now (RCA Records, 1978)

With Eddie Schwartz

- Schwartz (A&M, 1980)

With Neil Sedaka

- A Song (Elektra, 1977)

With Marlena Shaw

- Take a Bite (Columbia, 1979)

With Carly Simon

- Coming Around Again (Arista, 1987)

With Lonnie Smith

- Keep on Lovin' (Groove Merchant, 1976)

With Lonnie Liston Smith

- Silhouettes (Doctor Jazz, 1984)

With Belouis Some

- Some People (Parlophone, 1985)
- Belouis Some (Capitol Records, 1987)

With Bert Sommer

- Bert Sommer (Capitol, 1977)

With The Spinners

- Love Trippin' (Atlantic, 1980)
- Labor of Love (Atlantic, 1981)

With Billy Squier

- Signs of Life (Capitol, 1984)

With Brenda K. Starr

- Brenda K. Starr (MCA, 1987)

With Dire Straits

- Brothers in Arms (Vertigo, 1985)

With Barbra Streisand

- Emotion (Columbia, 1984)

With James Taylor

- That's Why I'm Here (Columbia, 1985)

With Andrea True

- More, More, More (Buddah, 1976)

With Bonnie Tyler

- Faster Than the Speed of Night (Columbia Records, 1983)

With Frankie Valli

- Closeup (Private Stock, 1976)

With Kenny Vance

- Short Vacation (Gold Castle, 1988)

With Village People

- Fox on the Box (Metronome, 1982)

With Loudon Wainwright III

- T Shirt (Arista, 1976)
