= Murder of Cheryl Keeton =

1986 murder in Oregon

- Location: Portland, Oregon, U.S.
- Date: September 21, 1986; 40 years ago
- Attack type: Homicide
- Victims: Cheryl Keeton, aged 36
- Perpetrator: Bradly Morris Cunningham

Cheryl Keeton (October 27, 1949 – September 21, 1986) was a Portland, Oregon lawyer who was found dead inside her Toyota Van on the Sunset Highway by a passing motorist. Her husband, with whom she was embroiled in a divorce, was found guilty of murder.

== Background ==
At the time of her death, she was going through bitter divorce and custody battles over her three sons with her husband, Bradly Morris Cunningham. A trial that followed her 1986 murder inspired true a crime writer, Ann Rule, to write her 1995 best seller, Dead By Sunset. Cheryl Keeton was interred in Bunker Hill Cemetery located in Cowlitz County, Washington.

== Murder ==
Bradly Morris Cunningham

Bradly Morris Cunningham (born 1948) was found guilty of murder and was admitted into the Oregon State Penitentiary on January 9, 1995 and is serving a life sentence. Since his incarceration, Bradly wrote and published an ebook titled "Ann Rule Deconstructed". The copyright is 2013. In his ebook, Bradly accused Ann Rule of being a liar and of exaggerating with regards to her "Dead By Sunset" book.

== Film ==
Dead by Sunset (1995) was a made-for-television movie that aired on the MSNBC television network. It was based on Ann Rule's true crime best selling novel. Actress Annette O'Toole starred as Cheryl Keeton and actor Ken Olin starred as Bradly Morris Cunningham.

== See also ==
- Domestic violence
