= Dead By Sunset =

1996 book by Ann Rule

Dead by Sunset
- First edition (h/b)
- Author: Ann Rule
- Language: English
- Subject: True crime; biography
- Publisher: Little, Brown
- Publication date: 1995
- ISBN: 978-0-316-91456-7

Dead by Sunset is a 1995 true crime nonfiction book by author Ann Rule. It is based on the 1986 Oregon case of the murder of Cheryl Keeton, who was found beaten to death inside her van on the Sunset Highway and the later conviction of her estranged husband, Brad Cunningham. The book made The New York Times Best Seller list in 1996.

Later in 1995, NBC aired a mini-series titled Dead by Sunset. It was based on the book and starred Annette O'Toole as Keeton and Ken Olin as Cunningham.

Following his conviction of first degree murder in the death of Cheryl Keeton, Brad Cunningham was incarcerated at the Oregon State Penitentiary on January 9, 1995, where he is serving a life sentence. Cunningham has since written an ebook entitled Ann Rule Deconstructed. In it, the convicted murderer claims Rule exaggerated the facts surrounding the investigation and his subsequent trial for Keeton's murder in Dead by Sunset.

== See also ==
- Domestic violence
