= Annette O'Toole =

American actress (born 1952)

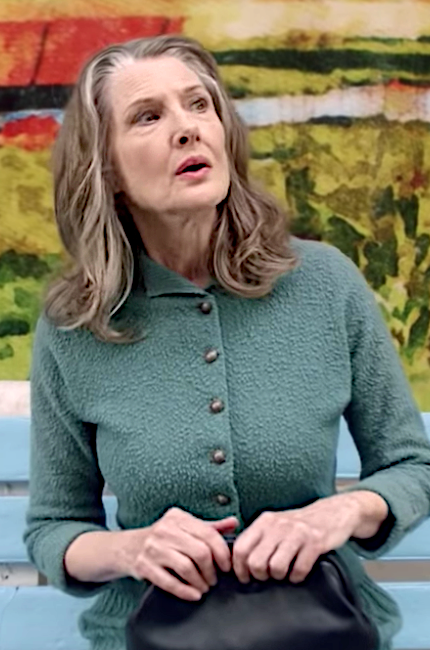
- O'Toole in a 2020 episode of the series Kidding
- Born: Annette Toole; April 1, 1952 (age 74); Houston, Texas, U.S.
- Occupations: Actress, singer
- Years active: 1967–present
- Spouses: Bill Geisslinger (m. 1983; div. 1993) Michael McKean (m. 1999)
- Children: 2

Annette O'Toole (born Annette Toole; April 1, 1952) is an American actress. She is known for portraying Lisa Bridges in the television series Nash Bridges, adult Beverly Marsh in the 1990 television mini-series adaptation of Stephen King's epic horror novel It, Lana Lang in Superman III, Kathy in the romantic-comedy film Cross My Heart, Annie Hodges in The Man Next Door and Martha Kent (the adoptive mother of Clark Kent) on the television series Smallville.

== Early life ==
O'Toole was born in Houston, the daughter of Dorothy Geraldine (née Niland) and William West Toole Jr. Her mother taught dance, which O'Toole herself began learning at the age of three. She started taking acting lessons after her family moved to Los Angeles when she was 13.

== Career ==
=== Film and television ===
O'Toole's first television appearance was in 1967 on The Danny Kaye Show, followed over the next few years with guest appearances in shows such as My Three Sons, The Virginian, Gunsmoke, Hawaii Five-O, and The Partridge Family.

Her first major film role was as a jaded beauty pageant contestant in the 1975 satire Smile; she got the role after doing an impression of a "dead cockroach" at the audition. She also appeared as the tutor and girlfriend of Robby Benson's character in the college basketball story One on One in 1977. She co-starred opposite Gary Busey in the 1980 film Foolin' Around. In 1981, she starred in the HBO onstage production of Vanities, as well as in the TV movie Stand By Your Man, which detailed the life of country music legend Tammy Wynette. Later on in 1982, she appeared briefly as Nick Nolte's girlfriend in 48 Hrs. That same year, she played Alice Perrin in Cat People, and then in 1983 she played Lana Lang/Superman), and single mother of Ricky in Superman III.

In 1985, she co-starred with Barry Manilow in the CBS television movie Copacabana playing Lola La Mar to Manilow's Tony Starr. Also in 1985, she had a starring role as Ms. Edmunds in the original Bridge to Terabithia, and appeared in the TV adaptation of Strong Medicine the following year. In 1987's Cross My Heart, a romantic comedy, O'Toole had a leading role opposite Martin Short.

In 1990, O'Toole had roles in two ABC television mini-series. She played the adult Beverly Marsh in the television mini-series adaptation of Stephen King's epic horror novel It. She also portrayed Rose Fitzgerald Kennedy in The Kennedys of Massachusetts, a role that earned her an Emmy nomination for Outstanding Lead Actress. She next starred in the 1992 NBC mini-series Jewels, based on the Danielle Steel novel of the same name.

In 1993, O'Toole starred in Desperate Justice as Ellen Wells. In 1995, she starred as Cheryl Keeton in the 1995 Lifetime television film based on Ann Rule's true crime novel Dead by Sunset. She had a recurring role on the television show Nash Bridges (1996) and starred in her own series The Huntress (2000) as a female bounty hunter. In 1997 O'Toole starred in the TV movie Keeping the Promise.

In 2001, 18 years after portraying Lana Lang in Superman III, O'Toole returned to the Superman mythos in the role of Martha Kent, Superman's adoptive mother, in the television series Smallville. She remained part of the show's main cast, though at times in the background, until the end of its sixth season. She made guest appearances in the final two seasons, reprising her role, while also portraying The Red Queen.

In 2010, O'Toole played the role of Veronica, a middle-aged woman with a severe case of Alzheimer's, in the television series Lie to Me. In 2013, she appeared in Grey's Anatomy as a school teacher who finds out, after surgery, that she will die from cancer.

O'Toole portrayed Susan Emerson in six episodes of the first two seasons of Halt and Catch Fire. In 2016, O'Toole returned to the Stephen King realm as boarding house owner Edna Price in "The Kill Floor" episode of the King miniseries 11.22.63. She and former Smallville co-star John Glover reunited for the 2016 horror film We Go On.

In 2019, O'Toole filled the role of Hope McCrea in the Netflix series Virgin River. She still currently plays the role, with season six being released in December 2024.

=== Music ===
O'Toole can date the beginning of her songwriting career to events during a car ride after the September 11 attacks; as her husband Michael McKean describes it, "On September 11, 2001, Annette found herself without an airline to carry her back down to Los Angeles from Vancouver, where she films Smallville. So she drove a rental car down. The two of us drove it back up together, and on the long drive up there, somewhere between Portland and Seattle, she told me she had a tune in her head." The "tune in her head" became "Potato's in the Paddy Wagon", one of three songs the couple wrote for A Mighty Wind, including the Oscar-nominated song "A Kiss at the End of the Rainbow".

O'Toole sang "What Could Be Better?"—a song she and her husband co-wrote – for the 2004 Disney children's album A World of Happiness.

In 2005, the couple did a cabaret act for "Feinstein's at the Regency" in New York City.

In 2007, O'Toole appeared as a backing singer for her husband's fictional band Spinal Tap at the London leg of the Live Earth concerts. She has also performed on the band's 2009 Unwigged and Unplugged tour, and contributed lyrics to "Short and Sweet" on the 2009 Spinal Tap album Back from the Dead.

In 2011, she starred in CAP21's production of the new musical Southern Comfort, based on the Sundance award-winning documentary, by Dan Collins and Julianne Wick Davis.

== Personal life ==
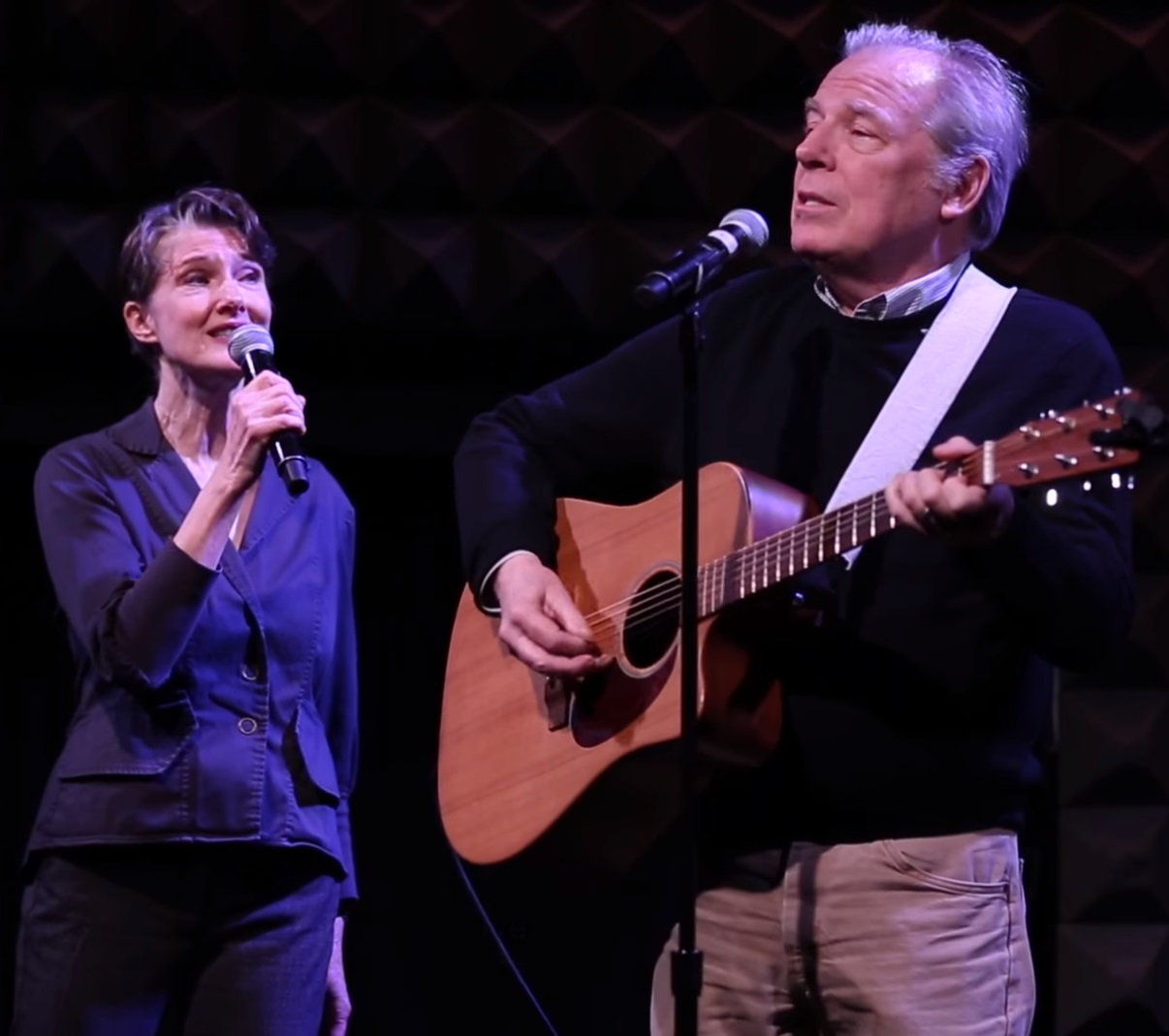
Singer-songwriter spouses Annette O'Toole and Michael McKean perform their song "Kiss at the End of the Rainbow" on Employee of the Month in 2016

Actor Bruno Kirby and O'Toole were in a relationship in the 1970s.

O'Toole married actor Bill Geisslinger on April 8, 1983; they divorced in 1993. The couple had two daughters.

O'Toole met fellow actor Michael McKean while working together on the 1998 television movie Final Justice. The two began bonding over McKean reading the book Dead by Sunset, for which O'Toole had starred in the miniseries adaption. They married on March 20, 1999, with O'Toole becoming the stepmother to McKean's two sons from a previous marriage. She and McKean share a musical career.

== Filmography ==
=== Films ===
Year	Title	Role	Notes
1970	Little Big Man	Passerby	Uncredited
1975	Smile	Doria – Young American Miss	
1977	One on One	Janet Hays	
1978	King of the Gypsies	Sharon	
1980	Foolin' Around	Susan	
1981	Stand by Your Man	Tammy Wynette	
1982	Cat People	Alice Perrin	
1982	48 Hrs.	Elaine Marshall	
1983	Superman III	Lana Lang	
1987	Cross My Heart	Kathy	
1990	Love at Large	Mrs. King	
1990	A Girl of the Limberlost	Kate Comstock	
1994	Andre	Adult Toni (voice)	
1994	On Hope	Hope	Short subject
1994	Imaginary Crimes	Ginny Rucklehaus	
2000	Here on Earth	Jo Cavanaugh	
2003	Temptation	Nora	
2009	Falling Up	Grace O' Shea	
2013	Stuff	Mother	Short subject
2014	Beach Pillows	Rita Midwood	
2016	We Go On	Charlotte	
2016	Women Who Kill	Lila	
2018	A Futile and Stupid Gesture	Stephanie Kenney	
2018	The Incoherents	Mrs. Graham	
2019	Blow the Man Down	Gail Maguire	

=== Television ===
Year	Title	Role	Notes
1967	My Three Sons	Tina	Episode: "The Chaperones"
1967	This Is the Life	Debbie	Episode: "Debbie"
1969	Bright Promise	Gypsy	Unknown episodes
1970	Dan August	Robbie Wagner	Episode: "Love Is a Nickel Bag"
1970	The Virginian	Lark Walters	Episode: "The Mysterious Mr. Tate"
1970	Gunsmoke	Edda Sprague	Episode: "The Witness"
1971	The Mod Squad	Lorrie Coleman	Episode: "A Bummer for R.J."
1971	The Partridge Family	Carol	Episode: "Partridge Up a Pear Tree"
1971	Hawaii Five-O	Sue	Episode: "...And I Want Some Candy and a Gun That Shoots"
1973	Search	Terry Bain	Episode: "The 24 Carat Hit"
1973	The Girl Most Likely to...	Jenny	ABC Movie of the Week
1973	The Rookies	Pregnant Woman	Episode: "Frozen Smoke"
1973	The Rookies	Bank Teller	Episode: "Lots of Trees and a Running Stream"
1974	The F.B.I.	Brenda Porter	Episode: "The Lost Man"
1974	Dirty Sally	George	Episode: "My Fair Laddie"
1974	Police Woman	Donna Hess	Episode: "Shoefly"
1975	S.W.A.T.	Rita Bonelli	Episode: "The Killing Ground"
1975	Petrocelli	Tina	Episode: "Terror on Wheels"
1975	The Entertainer	Bambi Pasko	TV movie
1976	Serpico	Heather	Episode: "The Indian"
1976	Barnaby Jones	Cas Carter	Episode: "Band of Evil"
1977	The War Between the Tates	Wendy Geoghegan	TV movie
1977	What Really Happened to the Class of '65?	Kathy Adams Miller	Episode: "Everybody's Girl"
1977–1978	The Tony Randall Show	Melissa	2 episodes
1979	Visions	Sandy	Episode: "Ladies in Waiting"
1979	Love for Rent	Carol Martin	TV movie
1981	Standing Room Only	Kathy	Episode: "Vanities"
1981	Stand by Your Man	Tammy Wynette	TV movie
1984	The Best Legs in the Eighth Grade	Rachel Blackstone	TV movie
1985	Bridge to Terabithia	Miss Edmunds	TV movie
1985	Alfred Hitchcock Presents	Stella	Pilot (segment: "An Unlocked Window")
1985	Copacabana	Lola Lamar	TV movie
1987	Broken Vows	Nana Marie 'Nim' Fitzpatrick	TV movie
1986	Strong Medicine	Jessica Weitz	TV movie
1989	Guts and Glory: The Rise and Fall of Oliver North	Betsy North	TV movie
1990	The Kennedys of Massachusetts	Rose Fitzgerald Kennedy	TV mini-series; Main cast
1990	It	Beverly Marsh	TV mini-series; Main cast
1990	The Dreamer of Oz: The L. Frank Baum Story	Maud Gage Baum	TV movie
1990	A Girl of the Limberlost	Kate Comstock	TV movie
1991	General Motors Playwrights Theater	Carol	Episode: "Unpublished Letters"
1991	White Lie	Helen Lester	TV movie
1992	Jewels	Sarah Thompson Whitfield	TV mini-series; Main cast
1993	Kiss of a Killer	Kate Wilson	TV movie
1993	Love Matters	Julie	TV movie
1993	Desperate Justice	Ellen Wells	TV movie; A.K.A. A Mother's Revenge
1995	My Brother's Keeper	Joann Bradley	TV movie
1995	The Outer Limits	Commander Lydia Manning	Episode: "Dark Matters"
1995	Dream On	Bess Justin	Episode: "Bess You Is Not My Woman Now"
1995	Dead By Sunset	Cheryl Keeton Cunningham	TV mini-series; Main cast
1995	The Christmas Box	Keri Evans	TV movie
1995	Lonesome Dove: The Series	Claudia Harrell	Episode: "Traveller"
1996	The Man Next Door	Annie Hodges	TV movie
1996–1998	Nash Bridges	Lisa Bridges	Main cast (season 1–2); Guest (season 4)
1997	Keeping the Promise	Anne Hallowell	TV movie
1997	Final Descent	Connie Phipps	TV movie
1998	Final Justice	Gwen Saticoy	TV movie
1999	Boy Meets World	Rhiannon Lawrence	Episode: "State of the Unions"
2000	Law & Order	Valerie Grace	Episode: "Mega"
2000–2001	The Huntress	Dorothy 'Dottie' Thorson	Main cast
2001–2007 2010–2011	Smallville	Martha Kent	Main cast (season 1–6); Guest (season 9–10)
2001–2007 2010–2011	Smallville	The Red Queen	2 episodes
2006	Aquaman	Atlanna (voice)	Pilot
2010	Lie to Me	Veronica	Episode: "Veronica"
2011	Private Practice	Janet	Episode: "Blind Love"
2012	The Finder	Elaine Sherman	Episode: "The Boy with the Bucket"
2013	Grey's Anatomy	Madeleine Skurski	Episode: "Idle Hands"
2014	F to 7th	Diane	Web series; 2 episodes
2014–2015	Halt and Catch Fire	Susan Emerson	Recurring (season 1–2)
2015	Battle Creek	Amelia Zuransky	Episode: "Homecoming"
2016	11.22.63	Edna Price	Episode: "The Kill Floor"
2019	The Punisher	Eliza Schultz	Recurring role (Season 2); 4 episodes
2019–present	Virgin River	Hope McCrea	Main role
2020	The Good Doctor	Caroline Reznik	Episode: "Sex and Death"
2020	Kidding	Louise	3 episodes
2020	Search Party	Diana Fontaine	Episode: "In God We Trust"

== Theatre ==
=== Plays ===
Year	Title	Role	Director	Venue	Ref.
2014	Third	Professor Laurie Jameson	Michael Cumpsty	Two River Theater, New Jersey	
2015	Hamlet in Bed	Anna	Lisa Peterson	Rattlestick Playwrights Theater, Off-Broadway	
2016	Southern Comfort	Robert	Thomas Caruso	Public Theater, New York	
2017	Man From Nebraska	Nancy Carpenter		Tony Kiser Theatre, New York	
2017	The Traveling Lady	Sitter Mavis	Austin Pendleton	Cherry Lane Theatre, Off- Broadway	
2018	A Lovely Sunday for Creve Coeur	Helena	Austin Pendleton	Theatre at St. Clement's, Off-Broadway	
2019	The Good Book	Miriam	Lisa Peterson	Berkeley Repertory Theatre, California	
2022	The Show-Off	Mrs. Fisher	Dan Wackerman	Theatre at St. Clement's, Off-Broadway	

=== Performances ===
Year	Title	Role	Director	Venue	Notes	Ref.
2021	The Typist	Anne Jackson	Austin Pendleton		A play reading, benefiting Williamstown Theatre Festival	
2024	Let You Be You	Self	Meredith Sharkey	Mastercard Midnight Theatre	Variety performance	

== Awards and nominations ==
Year	Award	Category	Nominated work	Result
1984	Saturn Awards	Best Supporting Actress	Superman III	Nominated
1990	Primetime Emmy Awards	Outstanding Lead Actress in a Miniseries or Special	The Kennedys of Massachusetts	Nominated
1991	Golden Globe Awards	Best Actress – Miniseries or Motion Picture Made for Television	The Kennedys of Massachusetts	Nominated
2003	Los Angeles Film Critics Association Awards	Best Music	A Mighty Wind	Nominated
2004	Academy Awards	Best Original Song	A Mighty Wind (for "A Kiss at the End of the Rainbow")	Nominated
2004	Satellite Awards	Best Original Song	A Mighty Wind (for "A Kiss at the End of the Rainbow")	Nominated
2005	Teen Choice Awards	Choice TV Parental Units	Smallville	Nominated
