= Desperate Justice =

1993 television film directed by Armand Mastroianni

- Also known as: A Mother's Revenge
- Genre: Drama; Crime
- Written by: John Robert Bensink; Richard Speight
- Directed by: Armand Mastroianni
- Starring: Lesley Ann Warren; Bruce Davison; Shirley Knight; Missy Crider; Allison Mack
- Music by: Laura Karpman
- Country of origin: United States
- Original language: English

Production
- Executive producer: Carla Singer
- Producer: Joan Carson
- Production locations: Phoenix, Arizona; Tucson, Arizona
- Cinematography: Paul Onorato
- Editor: Philip Sgriccia (as Phillip J. Sgriccia)
- Running time: 89 minutes
- Production companies: Carla Singer Productions; World International Network

Original release
- Network: ABC
- Release: November 14, 1993

A Mother's Revenge (aka Desperate Justice) is a 1993 American film starring Lesley Ann Warren, Bruce Davison, and Shirley Knight. The teleplay adaptation was written by John Bensink.

It was based on the novel (published:1989) of the same name by Richard Speight from Nashville, Tennessee (father of American actor Richard Speight, Jr.). The original novel may have been based on true story, as Speight was a Tennessean criminal attorney. According to Barnes & Noble author information, "He (Speight) taught trial law at Vanderbilt University for 14 years, and was a Writer in Residence at Belmont University for five years."

== Plot ==
Carol Sanders is a happily married housewife living in Arizona with her husband Bill and two daughters, 17-year-old Jill and 12-year-old Wendy. One afternoon, due to being caught up at work, Carol asks Jill to pick Wendy up from school. Jill forgets and hurries to collect Wendy much later; while she waits, Wendy is raped and severely beaten by Frank Warden, the school janitor, leaving her in a coma.

As Wendy is hospitalized, Carol withdraws from Jill, who she blames for not picking Wendy up on time. Frank is later arrested after the police discover he had two prior molestation charges in California, something the school claim they were unaware of before hiring him.

While detectives assure Bill they have a slam-dunk case, a number of discrepancies soon come to the surface in court, culminating in a solid alibi from Frank's mother, Bess, who testifies that her son was dining with her in a restaurant when the crime occurred. As a result, the case is dismissed. Seeing Frank joyous at the outcome, an angry, grief-stricken Carol pulls a gun out of her purse and shoots Frank.

After Carol is released on bail following her arrest, Wendy emerges from her coma with no recollection of the attack. Meanwhile, Frank eventually succumbs to his injuries. Carol approaches defence attorney Ellen Wells, who agrees to represent her, and the two prepare for Carol's case. Carol learns Jill has told Wendy what happened to her and, after an argument, Jill leaves the house and does not return the following morning, causing Carol to miss her first court appearance. Carol later finds Jill sitting with Wendy in the hospital; they have a heart-to-heart and reconcile their differences.

Wendy comes home but struggles to return to normal life, scared that her family and friends will treat her differently because of what happened to her. Meanwhile, Carol's trial finally begins; she fights to prove that she had lost control of herself in the moment she shot Frank, and had no intentions of actually killing him. However, the jury reaches a guilty verdict on the charge of manslaughter, devastating the Sanders family.

As the judge prepares to hand down Carol's sentence, Bess, who had been watching from the back of the courtroom, comes forward and admits she lied to protect her son, thinking the courts could prove Frank's crime without her help. Realising everything Wendy has already been through, she asks for leniency in Carol's sentencing. Moved by Bess' statement, the judge reduces his originally planned six-year-sentence to three years, which can be reduced further with good behaviour, and also grants weekly visits to Carol's family.

== Cast ==
- Lesley Ann Warren as Carol Sanders
- Bruce Davison as Bill Sanders
- Shirley Knight as Bess Warden
- Missy Crider as Jill Sanders
- Allison Mack as Wendy Sanders
- David Byron as Frank Warden
- Annette O'Toole as Ellen Wells

== DVD release ==
Desperate Justice was released on DVD in the UK on 8 October 2001.

Although the film never received a DVD release in the United States, it has been frequently seen on both Lifetime and sister channel Lifetime Movie Network since its original airing.

In 2014, a theatrical adaptation of the film/novel was produced in Japan by Gekidan Touhai production.
