= Bradley Cole =

American actor (born 1959)

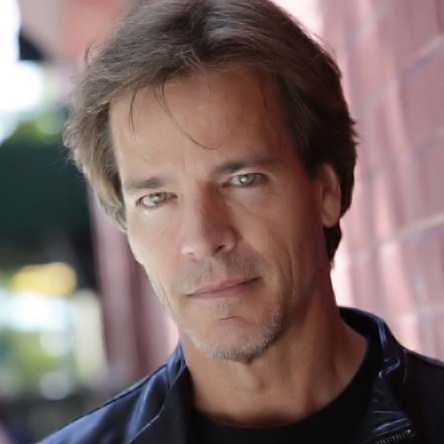
- Cole in 2008
- Born: Bradley Thomas Cole; February 11, 1959 (age 67); Los Angeles, California, U.S.
- Other names: Brad Cole; Brandley Cole
- Occupations: Actor; Singer; Songwriter; Guitarist
- Years active: 1984–present
- Spouse: Yasuko Noada (m. 2005)
- Children: 2

Bradley Thomas Cole (born February 11, 1959) is an American actor, singer-songwriter, and musician.

== Early life and education ==
Cole was born and raised in Los Angeles County, California. He began guitar lessons at 8 years old and was heavily influenced by rock and soul music from the 1960s and 70s. He played in various rock bands throughout his teen and high school years in California.

Cole studied drama and business at Pepperdine University in Malibu, California where he also played baseball. He hoped to play professionally until an injury put that dream aside, and he turned his focus to acting and his music. Cole won the "Best Actor" award for his performance in the play, One Flew Over the Cuckoo's Nest. He then traveled to Europe where played solo and in groups in clubs and small venues there.

== Career ==
While in Paris, France, Cole founded a theater company, La Version Originale, where he performed in classic American dramas such as Who's Afraid of Virginia Woolf?, as well as original plays which he authored and for which he composed the music. He continued pursuing songwriting and music and played in bands in Paris as well as in other European cities. During this time he was offered many roles in both French and American television and film, including the miniseries The Sun Also Rises (1984) and Jewels (1992), the television films Sweet Revenge (1990) and Touch and Die (1992), the theatrical feature film Five Days in June (1989), and the international soap opera Riviera (1991–92). He is most known in France for his portrayal of Daniel Green on the popular sitcom Les Filles d'à Côté.

In the late 90s, Cole traveled to Nashville, Tennessee to record his first album of original compositions. The album was released in Europe and is scheduled for a re-release in 2022. In the early 2000s, he was noticed by casting director Glenn Daniels and was cast in the long-running soap opera The Guiding Light to play the dual characters of Prince Richard and Jeffrey O'Neil, the love interest of Reva Shayne, played by five-time Emmy winner Kim Zimmer in New York City, a stint that lasted for over ten years. The role(s) garnered him a Soap Digest Award nomination and best supporting actor Emmy pre-nomination and he topped the fan voter polls in CBS Soap Digest magazine numerous times.

During his time in New York, Cole recorded and released three more albums of original music and toured extensively across America playing mostly in small clubs and venues coast to coast. While in New York he also performed in off-Broadway theater as well as roles in productions of Shakespeare in Princeton, New Jersey. His music has been recently uploaded to social media platforms and can be found on Spotify and Apple I-Tunes as well as YouTube. After the birth of his second child, Cole took an extended break from the entertainment industry to be a stay-at-home dad. In 2021 he returned to television guest starring on the French soap Les Mystères de l'amour ("The Mysteries of Love").

== Personal life ==
He and his wife, Yasuko, married on June 25, 2005 and are the parents of son Sean William and daughter Maya Joan.

== Filmography ==
Bradley Cole film and television credits
Year	Title	Role	Notes	Ref.
1984	The Sun Also Rises	Young Lieutenant	Television miniseries	
1985	The Last Five Minutes	Red	Episode: "Tilt" (S2.E14)	
1988	Les Cinq Dernières Minutes	Inspecteur Jackson	Episode: "Pour qui sonne le jazz" (S2.E55)	
1989	Five Days in June	Un officier américain	Theatrical Film	
1990	Sweet Revenge	Larry Stevens	Television Film	
1991	La milliadaire	Nicholas Elwood	Television Film	
1991–1992	Riviera	Sam	Soap-opera	
1992	Maguy	Tony		
1992	Touch and Die	Harrison	Television film	
1992	Counterstrike	Jacques Baire	Episode: "Bastille Day Terror"	
1992	Jewels	Freddie Van Deering	Television miniseries	
1993–1995	Les Filles d'à Côté	Daniel Green	135 episodes	
1998	Les Vacances de l'Amour	Paul Richardson	1 episode	
1999	Une Pour Toutes	Unknown	Theatrical Film	
1999–2002	Guiding Light	Richard Winslow	Regular cast	
2003	All My Children	Jordan Roberts	2 episodes	
2003–2009	Guiding Light	Jeffrey O'Neil	Regular cast	
2004	Brother to Brother	MacAllister, book publisher	Theatrical film	
2010	General Hospital	Warren Bauer	16 episodes	
