= Little Tramp (musical) =

Musical by David Pomeranz and Steven David Horwich

- Concept Recording
- Music: David Pomeranz
- Lyrics: David Pomeranz
- Book: David Pomeranz; Steven David Horwich
- Basis: The life of Charlie Chaplin
- Productions: 1995 Waterford; 1996 St. Petersburg, Russia

See The Tramp for the character played by Charlie Chaplin.

Little Tramp is a musical with a book by David Pomeranz and Steven David Horwich and music and lyrics by David Pomeranz.

Based on the life of comedian Charles Chaplin and named after his most famous character, The Tramp, it opens at the 1971 Academy Awards ceremony at which the aging star, long exiled from the United States, is about to receive a Lifetime Achievement Award. The trajectory of the impressive professional career and turbulent private life that leads to this moment is traced via flashbacks in which Chaplin recalls his introduction to Hollywood and silent movies, his failed marriages and problems with the press, his dealings with the FBI, and the creation of his most beloved character, the iconic Little Tramp.

In 1992, in order to create interest in a staged production, Pomeranz gathered together what he referred to as his "dream cast" and recorded a CD of the score. Artists participating in the project included Petula Clark, Lea Salonga, Tim Curry, Mel Brooks, Treat Williams, and Peter Duncan as Chaplin. It was released on the Warner Music UK Ltd. label.

Little Tramp received its first staging in 1995 at the prestigious Eugene O'Neill Theater Festival in Waterford, Connecticut (Eugene O'Neill having been the father of Chaplin's wife, Oona O'Neill). The following year, a concert version was presented in St. Petersburg, Russia to inaugurate the world's first East/West Musical Theater Conference.

The show was first performed in the UK by Imagine Productions in Preston, and was endorsed by Richard Attenborough, director of the biopic Chaplin.

== Synopsis ==
At the 1971 Academy Awards ceremony in Los Angeles, an 82-year-old Charlie Chaplin is about to receive a special Life Achievement award. 20 years earlier, Charlie had been barred from re-entry into the United States on the grounds that he was a Communist ("In America Again").

Charlie looks back at his life. His mother, a failed music hall performer, trying to make ends meet to support little Charlie and his older brother Sydney, reminds her sons that they have something more than mere material possessions ("Something No One Can Ever Take Away").

Not able to support her children, Hannah Chaplin is taken to the workhouse. The boys try selling their old clothing on the streets but there are no takers. Hungry and heartbroken, Sydney tries to cheer things up ("When the World Stops Turning") while the Charlie of 1971 rejoins them.

When Sydney joined the Navy, Charlie is left to fend for himself. Determined to help his mother, Charlie joined a dance troupe called "The Eight Lancashire Lads", but his mother's condition worsens, and she is placed in an insane asylum. Dodging truant officers, Charlie sees a sign, "Blackmore's Theatrical Agency" and barges into the agent's office ("Number One").

Now grown up and a consummate English Stage comedian, Charlie is discovered by filmmaker Mack Sennett and signed to a contract at Keystone Studios in California. Sennett's style of "pie in the face" comedy is different from Chaplin's slower, more deliberate style, and when Charlie tries to assert his ideas, Sennett gives him some strong advice ("Less It Ends with a Chase").

Charlie is relentless. Sennett finally throws up his hands in frustration and gives Charlie a chance ("The Tramp"/"He's Got to be Someone").

Charlie becomes an overnight sensation. Film distributors, fans and theater owners can't get enough of him ("Chaplin Films").

Charlie opens his own picture studio, and he becomes one of the most beloved public figures. One evening, he is visited by a local chapter of Chaplin Fan Club ("Thank You").

By this time, Sydney returns as Charlie's personal manager. Getting ready for a swank Hollywood party, Sydney reminisces how far they've come ("Heaven").

Back to 1971, Charlie's wife, Oona, is instructed by the show's assistant director on how Charlie should play to the camera. Furthermore, a government official then warns her that Charlie should avoid making any political comments. Oona is incensed ("He's Got to be Someone (Reprise)").

The story returns to the 1920s. Charlie's career and personal life are at a low point. His mother just died, and he just underwent two bitter divorces. He is overworked, reporters are on to him and to make things worse, talking pictures are threatening his artistic survival ("Too Many Words").

Nonetheless his success continued, and Charlie revisits England to attend a Royal Premiere of City Lights. He wanders through his old neighborhood and is stunned that injustice and poverty still exists. In an effort to improve such degenerate conditions, he decides to speak out on behalf of the Russian War Relief. He contends that it's no concern whether or not these people are Communist, they're being slaughtered by the Nazis. After one of his speeches, FBI agent Tippy Gray takes notes and reports his finding to Bureau Chief J. Edgar Hoover ("I Got Me a Red"/"There's Got to be a Law").

A paternity suit is filed against Chaplin, giving Hoover ammunition he needed. Although a blood test disproves the allegation, the press crucifies him. His fans turn on him and his films are boycotted. Charlie is dejected. He is convinced that it is just a matter of time before his new wife Oona leaves him too. However. Oona assures him that she won't ("This is What I Dreamed").

The Chaplins decide to cruise Europe, but aboard the ship, Charlie receives a cable from Washington stating that in order to re-enter the U.S., he must answer to political and moral charges. Crestfallen, Charlie decided to spend the next 20 years living in Veney, Switzerland.

Back to 1971, Charlie is escorted to the stage while deeply regarding what he will tell his audience ("Finale").

== Concept album (1992) ==
Cast

Charlie Chaplin (age 9) - Leonard Kirby

Charlie Chaplin (middle years) - Peter Duncan

Charlie Chaplin (age 82) - Richard Harris

Sydney Chaplin - Johnny Logan

Sydney Chaplin (age 12) - Jonathan Rudoe

Hannah Chaplin - Petula Clark

Oona Chaplin - Lea Salonga

Mack Sennett - Mel Brooks

Tippy Gray - Tim Curry

J. Edgar Hoover - Treat Williams

Fan Club President - David Pomeranz

Mr. Blackmore - Mel Smith

Mrs. Henley - Jacquie Toye
