= Simplicity (Tim Curry album) =

Studio album by Tim Curry
- Released: 1981
- Recorded: 1980–1981
- Genre: Rock
- Length: 34:58
- Label: A&M
- Producer: Michael Kamen

Tim Curry chronology
| Fearless (1979) | Simplicity (1981) |

Simplicity is the third and final studio album recorded by the English actor and singer Tim Curry, released in 1981 by A&M Records.

Whereas his previous album Fearless had been almost entirely original songs, Simplicity is a half-originals, half-covers album and contains a wider variety of source material than the covers on his first album Read My Lips (1978). Covers include a version of the Zombies' "She's Not There" and Martha and the Vandellas' "Dancing in the Streets", both of which were hits in 1964. Curry also performs a version of "Take Me, I'm Yours", originally a 1978 hit by Squeeze. "Out of Pawn" was originally by Davis Lasley's band Rosie, produced by Michael Kamen.

The track "Working on My Tan" was released as a single in certain countries (backed with "On a Roll") but was not commercially successful. Curry did not make any promo videos for the album.

== Track listing ==
1. "Working on My Tan" (Tim Curry, Michael Kamen, Bob Babbitt, Charles Collins, Bob Kulick, Michael Tschudin) – 4:05
2. "She's Not There" (Rod Argent) – 2:22
3. "Simplicity" (Tim Curry, Bob Babbitt, Charles Collins) – 4:13
4. "On a Roll" (Tim Curry, Michael Kamen, Joel Newman) – 2:49
5. "Take Me, I'm Yours" (Chris Difford, Glenn Tilbrook) – 3:50
6. "Dancing in the Streets" (Marvin Gaye, Ivy Hunter, William "Mickey" Stevenson) – 3:59
7. "Betty Jean" (Tim Curry, Michael Kamen) – 3:20
8. "Out of Pawn" (David Lasley, Lana Marrano) – 3:43
9. "Summer in the City" (John Sebastian) – 3:05
10. "I Put a Spell on You" (Screamin' Jay Hawkins) – 3:32

== Personnel ==
- Tim Curry – vocals
- Hank Crawford, Howard Johnson, David "Fathead" Newman, David Sanborn – saxophone
- Charlie Miller – trumpet
- Art Baron – trombone
- Michael Kamen – keyboards
- Bryant Montiro, Joel Newman, Earl Slick – guitar
- John Siegler – bass
- Noel Alphonso – drums
- Jimmy Maelen – percussion
- Laurel Massé, Gui Andresano, Ula Andrisano, Ula Hedwig, Seth, Dian Sorel, Sasha – background vocals

== Charts ==
| Chart (1981) | Peak position |
|---|---|
| Canada Top Albums/CDs (RPM) | 45 |
| US Billboard 200 | 112 |
