= Foolin' Around =

1980 film by Richard T. Heffron

- Theatrical release poster
- Directed by: Richard T. Heffron
- Written by: Michael Kane; David Swift
- Produced by: Arnold Kopelson
- Starring: Gary Busey; Annette O'Toole; Eddie Albert; Tony Randall; Cloris Leachman; John Calvin
- Cinematography: Philip H. Lathrop
- Edited by: Peter Zinner
- Music by: Charles Bernstein
- Production company: GCC Productions
- Distributed by: Columbia Pictures
- Release date: October 17, 1980
- Running time: 100 minutes
- Country: United States
- Language: English
- Budget: $6 million
- Box office: $2 million

Foolin' Around is a 1980 American romantic comedy sports film directed by Richard T. Heffron and starring Gary Busey and Annette O'Toole. The film was shot on location in Minneapolis and Saint Paul, Minnesota. The theme music was performed by Seals and Crofts.

== Plot ==
College student Wes (Gary Busey), who comes from Oklahoma to a university in Minnesota, signs up to participate in a psychological experiment where he meets Susan (Annette O'Toole). The two are instantly attracted to each other. Besides the problem of their differing socioeconomic backgrounds, Susan is also engaged. However, Susan's grandfather recognizes her fiancé's opportunism and when he sides with Wes, their relationship is given more of a chance, in spite of the concern Susan's mother has about social status.

== Cast ==
- Gary Busey as Wes
- Annette O'Toole as Susan
- Cloris Leachman as Samantha
- William H. Macy as Bronski
- Tony Randall as Peddicord
- Michael Talbott as Clay
- Eddie Albert as Daggett
- John Calvin as Whitley
- Shirley Kane as Aunt Eunice
- Beth Bosacker as Rickie
- Roy Jenson as Blue
- Gene Lebell as Paul
- Makarand Jawadekar as Vijay Singh, a friend of Wes

== Production ==
Susan's house, where Wes comes to play tennis and crashes her bridal shower, was the original Pillsbury family home, built in 1918 on Lake Minnetonka and called "Southways" because one must go "south a ways" to reach the estate. The address is 1400 Brackets Point Road, Orono, Minnesota. It is a 32,461-square-foot (3,015.7 m^{2}) home situated on 12.91 acres (5.22 ha), with 1,700 feet (520 m) of lakeshore, a cottage guest house, a greenhouse, 13 garages, an outdoor pool, a tennis court, and an attached tandem four-car garage. It was listed for $54 million, dropped to $24 million, and dropped again to $7.9 million, eventually sold for $11,327,239 in August 2018. The mansion was demolished one day after new owners closed on the property.

== Critical reception ==
Janet Maslin of The New York Times gave the film a mixed review:

Foolin' Around is an affable, meandering comedy with a nice cast and nowhere much to go... The rich-girl scenes are perked up considerably by Cloris Leachman, though... Richard T. Heffron's direction has a television blandness (most of his other work has been in television), but he keeps the story moving briskly even when it's familiar. The performances vary widely, from Tony Randall's peculiarly humorless turn as a diabolical and/or drunken butler, to Miss O'Toole's personable but innocuous heiress, to the rough-hewn, easygoing Mr. Busey and Eddie Albert, as a construction mogul who thinks Mr. Busey may grow up to be just like him. Mr. Calvin is also noteworthy, for making Whitley much less of a dope than stock characters like Whitley usually are.
