= What About Dick? =

- Music: John Du Prez
- Lyrics: Eric Idle; John Du Prez
- Book: Eric Idle
- Premiere: 26 April 2012: Orpheum Theatre, Los Angeles

What About Dick? is a musical comedy and a parody of classic radio plays and period dramas such as Merchant Ivory Productions and Downton Abbey.

== Synopsis ==
The story of the decline of the British Empire through the eyes of a Piano. Centred on a young man named Dick who is studying philosophy and gynaecology at Oxford; his two cousins - Emma, an emotionally repressed English girl, and her kleptomaniac sister Helena; and their dipsomaniac Aunt Maggie, who all live together in Kensington in a large, "rambling, Edwardian novel". When the Reverend Whoopsie discovers the Piano on a beach, a plot is set afoot that can be solved only by Dick, and the incomprehensible Scottish sleuth Inspector McGuffin, who with the aid of Sergeant Ken Russell finally reveals the identity of the Houndsditch Mutilator.

== Background ==
Initially a screenplay Idle had written for himself to direct, then titled Remains of the Piano, the film was planned around an ensemble cast including Idle, Geoffrey Rush, Anjelica Huston, Orlando Bloom, Neve Campbell, Tim Curry, Michael York, Patrick Stewart, Catherine O'Hara, Billy Connolly, Julian Sands, with a cameo appearance by Robin Williams. Scheduled to begin shooting in August 2003, funding floundered just before production began.

== Production ==
Idle later reworked the screenplay into the stage play What About Dick? with two workshop performances in November 2007. Held at the Ricardo Montalbán Theatre in Hollywood, the workshop featured Idle, Tim Curry, Billy Connolly, Eddie Izzard, Jane Leeves, Emily Mortimer, Jim Piddock, and Tracey Ullman.

Much of the workshop cast reunited for the official premiere on 26 April 2012 at the Orpheum Theatre in Los Angeles, for a run of four nights, with Idle directing. Casting changes from the 2007 workshop include the addition of Russell Brand in the role of Dick and Sophie Winkleman replacing Mortimer. The updated play now featured several songs Idle co-wrote with John Du Prez. A recording of the production was released 13 November 2012 for digital download.
