= My Favorite Year (musical) =

Musical by Joseph Dougherty, Stephen Flaherty and Lynn Ahren

- Original Production Poster
- Music: Stephen Flaherty
- Lyrics: Lynn Ahrens
- Book: Joseph Dougherty
- Basis: 1982 film My Favorite Year
- Premiere: December 10, 1992: Vivian Beaumont Theater, New York City
- Productions: 1992 Broadway

My Favorite Year is a musical with a book by Joseph Dougherty, music by Stephen Flaherty, and lyrics by Lynn Ahrens. It is based on the 1982 film of the same name.

== Production history ==
The musical opened on Broadway at Lincoln Center's Vivian Beaumont Theater on December 10, 1992, and closed on January 10, 1993, after 36 performances and 45 previews. The cast included Evan Pappas, Tim Curry, Tom Mardirosian, Katie Finneran, Andrea Martin (in her Broadway debut), Josh Mostel, and Lainie Kazan, who reprised the role of Benjy's mother she had played in the film. The show was directed by Ron Lagomarsino and choreographed by Thommie Walsh, with scenic design by Thomas Lynch, costume design by Patricia Zipprodt, and lighting design by Jules Fisher, with associate lighting designer Peggy Eisenhauer.

The production experienced many challenges, and constant revisions were made by the creative team during previews.

My Favorite Year received mixed-to-negative reviews. The New York Times's Frank Rich called the musical "a missed opportunity, a bustling but too frequently flat musical that suffers from another vogue of the 1950s, an identity crisis," and disapproved of the melodramatic turn taken in the show's second act. Time magazine called it a "barren Broadway musical."

The original cast recording was released by RCA Victor.

In March 2007, The Chicago Sun-Times revealed that Flaherty and Ahrens were "reworking the show with an eye on a new Broadway production." Flaherty said that "In hindsight, I think our decision to paint the musical in somewhat darker colors was a mistake." Among the revisions made to the show are two new songs, incorporated into a March 2007 production of the show at the Bailiwick Repertory Theatre, Chicago.

Musicals Tonight! in New York City presented a staged concert in April 2003.

The York Theatre Company Musicals in Mufti in New York City presented a staged concert in December 2014. Lynn Ahrens reminisced about the first time Andrea Martin sang "Professional Showbizness Comedy": "It bombed.... By the time we got done with our rewrites...she stopped the show."

== Principal casts ==
Character	Broadway	York Theatre concert	25th anniversary concert
Character	1992	2014	2017
Benjy Stone	Evan Pappas	Adam Chanler-Berat	Adam Chanler-Berat
Alan Swann	Tim Curry	Douglas Sills	Douglas Sills
King Kaiser	Tom Mardirosian	Richard Kind	Richard Kind
Alice Miller	Andrea Martin	Leslie Kritzer	Carolee Carmello
K.C. Downing	Lannyl Stephens	Rose Hemingway	Rose Hemingway
Belle May Steinberg Carroca	Lainie Kazan	Christine Pedi	Caroline O'Connor
Sy Benson	Josh Mostel	Daniel Marcus	Daniel Marcus
Herb Lee	Ethan Phillips	Aaron Galligan-Stierle	Aaron Galligan-Stierle
Leo Silver	Paul Stolarsky	Thom Sesma	Thom Sesma
Rookie Carroca	Thomas Ikeda	Francis Jue	Steven Eng
Uncle Morty	David Lipman	Daniel Marcus	Daniel Marcus
Aunt Sadie	Mary Stout	Barbara Marineau	Barbara Marineau
Tess	Katie Finneran	Bree Banker	Bree Banker

== Plot ==
In the 1950s, Benjy Stone (a Mel Brooks-type) is a sketch writer for a live television variety show starring King Kaiser (a Sid Caesar-type). Signed for a guest appearance is Alan Swann (an Errol Flynn-type), a one-time movie idol whose career was disrupted by his addiction to alcohol and loose women. The task of keeping him sober and celibate until airtime falls to Benjy, who soon finds himself involved in a sequence of shenanigans. Various characters, including Benjy's pushy mother Belle Steinberg Carroca and Alan Swann's estranged daughter Tess, complicate Benjy's task. The other writers, Sy, Alice and Herb, add to the chaos.

== Musical numbers ==
Act I

- "Twenty Million People" – Benjy and Company
- "Larger Than Life" – Benjy
- "The Musketeer Sketch" – Benjy, Sy, King, Alice, K.C., Leo and Herb
- "Waldorf Suite" – Benjy, Offstage Chorus
- "Rookie in the Ring" – Belle
- "Manhattan" – Alan and Ensemble
- "Naked in Bethesda Fountain" – Sy, Alice, Leo, Herb and K.C.
- "The Gospel According to King" – King, Alan and Ensemble
- "The Musketeer Sketch Rehearsal" – Musketeers, Benjy, and Alan
- "Funny / The Duck Joke" – K. C. and Alice
- "The Musketeer Sketch Rehearsal Part II" – King, Alan and Ensemble
- "Welcome to Brooklyn" – Morty, Rookie, Belle, Sadie, Benjy, Alan and Neighbors
- "If the World Were Like the Movies" – Alan

Act II

- "Exits" – Alan
- "Shut Up and Dance" – K.C., Benjy, Offstage Chorus
- "Professional Showbizness Comedy" – Alice, King and Ensemble
- "The Lights Come Up" – Alan and Benjy
- "Maxford House" – Maxford House Girls
- "The Musketeer Sketch Finale" – King and Ensemble
- "My Favorite Year" – Benjy and Company

The album, My Favorite Year (Original Broadway Cast Recording) was released in 1993 with Andrea Martin, Lainie Kazan and Tim Curry on RCA Victor.

== Awards and nominations ==
=== Original Broadway production ===
Year	Award ceremony	Category	Nominee	Result
1993	Tony Award	Best Performance by a Leading Actor in a Musical	Tim Curry	Nominated
1993	Tony Award	Best Performance by a Featured Actress in a Musical	Andrea Martin	Won
1993	Tony Award	Best Performance by a Featured Actress in a Musical	Lainie Kazan	Nominated
1993	Drama Desk Award	Outstanding Featured Actor in a Musical	Josh Mostel	Nominated
1993	Drama Desk Award	Outstanding Featured Actress in a Musical	Andrea Martin	Won
1993	Drama Desk Award	Outstanding Orchestrations	Michael Starobin	Nominated
1993	Outer Critics Circle Award	Outstanding Actress in a Musical	Lainie Kazan	Nominated
1993	Theatre World Award		Andrea Martin	Won
