= The Art of Success =

Play by Nick Dear

The Art of Success is a play by the British playwright Nick Dear, centered on the life of William Hogarth. It premiered at the Royal Shakespeare Company in 1986, with Michael Kitchen playing Hogarth and Niamh Cusack playing his wife, Jane. It premiered to an American audience at the Manhattan Theatre Club in December 1989, with Tim Curry playing Hogarth and Mary-Louise Parker playing Jane. Both productions were directed by Adrian Noble.

== Original cast ==
- Jane Hogarth - Niamh Cusack
- William Hogarth - Michael Kitchen
- Henry Fielding - Philip Franks
- Frank - David Killick
- Oliver - Simon Russell Beale
- Mrs. Needham - Dilys Laye
- Louisa - Dinah Stabb
- Sarah Sprackling - Penny Downie
- Robert Walpole - Joe Melia
- Queen Caroline - Susan Porrett
