= American Duos =

- Psych episode
- Shawn and Gus perform in the finale of American Duos
- Episode no.: Season 2 Episode 1
- Directed by: John Landis
- Written by: Steve Franks; James Roday
- Cinematography by: Michael McMurray
- Editing by: David Crabtree
- Production code: 2001
- Original air date: July 13, 2007

Guest appearances
- Tim Curry as Nigel St. Nigel; Cristián de la Fuente as Zapato Dulce; Gina Gershon as Emilina Saffron

Episode chronology
← Previous "Scary Sherry: Bianca's Toast"	Next → "65 Million Years Off"
- Psych season 2

"American Duos" is the first episode of the second season of Psych, and is the 16th episode overall.

== Plot synopsis ==
When the latest season of the pair-based singing competition show American Duos prepares for an audition show in Santa Barbara, the cruel British judge Nigel St. Nigel (Tim Curry) finds himself in a panic after a series of near-miss attempts on his life and hires Santa Barbara's most reliable psychic detective to protect him. Nigel believes that the police are in on the conspiracy, so Shawn (James Roday) and Gus (Dulé Hill) go undercover as contestants on American Duos to protect him. While exiting his trailer, Nigel is stopped by Shawn before he walks in an electrified puddle when Shawn notices a live wire in the puddle. Shawn then stops Nigel from eating a specially ordered sandwich when he notices that the toothpicks are not the ones the hotel uses. When the toxicology report comes back from the police, it turns out the sandwich was poisoned with prescription drugs.

The culprit turns out to be repeat contestant Bevin Rennie Llywellen (Scott Nicholas Perrie), who would fail on purpose in spite of his amazing singing voice, for the sake of being able to audition in another city should his attempt on Nigel's life fail in the current city. The plan was orchestrated by Zapato Dulce (Cristián de la Fuente), one of the other judges. Zapato was a Latin pop star and singer of "Mírame," whose comeback was ruined by Nigel, who would never let him speak during the judging—Nigel actually believed Zapato could not talk or think at all. Zapato was so overshadowed by Nigel he even received fan mail addressed to other Latin artists such as Ricky Martin. After this revelation, Nigel is not shocked, and becomes an even bigger jerk, calling Zapato the "worst murderer ever."

Shawn and Gus perform a decent musical number, only to have Nigel no longer having to force them through the competition, calling it one of the worst performances he ever saw.

== Production ==
Star James Roday Rodriguez, who plays Shawn Spencer, co-wrote this episode. It is a send up of American Idol, and Tim Curry plays the Simon Cowell-esque British judge Nigel St. Nigel. Gina Gershon plays Emilina Saffron, who is a caricature of Paula Abdul. In the episode, Gus says (of Randy Jackson), "That guy's not black, he's Latino. There's a difference," comparing Jackson and the third Duos judge, Zapato. According to Roday, "American Duos" had theretofore the highest production value of any Psych episode.

== Reception ==
Richard Keller of TVSquad.com felt that the first half of "American Duos" was stronger and produced more laughs than the second. Keller also thought that the case was weak, and took a backseat to the other events in the episode. Sheldon A. Wiebe of Eclipse Magazine gave the episode a B+. He felt that part of the mystery was easy for viewers to solve, but that determining both killers was difficult. He said that the two stars kept the "show moving at all times," but that "American Duos" poor writing made Psych's Friday night partner Monk look like Seinfeld.
