= Fearless (Tim Curry album) =

Studio album by Tim Curry
- Released: 28 June 1979
- Studios: The Hit Factory (New York City); Long View Farm (Massachusetts)
- Length: 38:31
- Label: A&M
- Producers: Michael Kamen; Dick Wagner

Tim Curry chronology
| Read My Lips (1978) | Fearless (1979) | Simplicity (1981) |

Fearless is the second studio album by the English actor and singer Tim Curry, released on 28 June 1979 by A&M Records. It was his most commercially successful album, reaching No. 53 on the US Billboard 200.

Unlike his first album, which consisted of cover versions, Fearless was composed almost entirely of original songs, mostly written by Curry with producers Michael Kamen and former Lou Reed collaborator Dick Wagner.

A single, "I Do the Rock", became Curry's most successful in the United States, peaking at number 91 on the Billboard Hot 100. "Paradise Garage" was also released as a 7" and 12" single in certain countries.

"No Love on the Street" was covered by Joe Bonamassa on his 2011 album, Dust Bowl. He said, "This is the last song we recorded for the album. We needed one more oddball choice, and Kevin came up with this track, which was written by Michael Kamen and Tim Curry... Again, it’s a bit of a weird choice, but that’s why I like it so much."

== Critical reception ==
Professional ratings
Review scores
| Source | Rating |
|---|---|
| AllMusic | 2/5 stars |

The Globe and Mail wrote that "Curry is definitely a better interpreter of other people's material than he is a songwriter."

== Track listing ==
1. "Right on the Money" (Tim Curry, Dick Wagner) – 3:15
2. "Hide This Face" (Tim Curry, Dick Wagner) – 2:56
3. "I Do the Rock" (Tim Curry, Michael Kamen) – 4:45
4. "S.O.S." (Dick Wagner) – 4:15
5. "Cold Blue Steel and Sweet Fire" (Joni Mitchell) – 3:37
6. "Paradise Garage" (Tim Curry, Dick Wagner, Bob Babbitt, Charlie Collins) – 6:13
7. "No Love on the Street" (Tim Curry, Michael Kamen) – 4:53
8. "Something Short of Paradise" (Dick Wagner) – 3:20
9. "Charge It" (Tim Curry, Dick Wagner) – 5:17

A 2017 remastered re-release of the album on CD includes the following bonus tracks, after the original nine.

1. "Paradise Garage (Single Edit)" (Tim Curry, Dick Wagner, Bob Babbitt, Charlie Collins) – 4:05
2. "Charge It (Single Edit)" (Tim Curry, Dick Wagner) – 3:59
3. "I Do the Rock (High Fidelity Mix)" (Tim Curry, Michael Kamen) – 4:41
4. "Sloe Gin" (Bob Ezrin, Michael Kamen) – 6:08

== Personnel ==
- Tim Curry – vocals
- Dick Wagner – guitar
- Bob Babbitt – bass
- Charles Collins – drums, percussion
- Michael Kamen – keyboards, oboe
- Bette Sussman – keyboards
- Michael Tschudin – synthesizer
- Jimmy Maelen, Allan Schwartzberg – percussion
- David Sanborn – alto saxophone
- Arnold McCuller, David Lasley, Ula Hedwig – backing vocals

== Charts ==
| Chart (1979) | Peak position |
|---|---|
| US Billboard 200 | 53 |

== See also ==
- Paradise Garage
