= Read My Lips (Tim Curry album) =

Studio album by Tim Curry
- Released: 14 April 1978
- Genres: Glam rock; pop rock; hard rock
- Length: 38:52
- Label: A&M
- Producer: Bob Ezrin

Tim Curry chronology
The Rocky Horror Picture Show (1975)	Read My Lips (1978)	Fearless (1979)

Professional ratings
Review scores
Source	Rating
AllMusic	3.5/5 stars

Read My Lips is the debut solo studio album by the English actor and singer Tim Curry, released on 14 April 1978 by A&M Records. It is primarily an album of cover versions, and was produced by Bob Ezrin with Michael Kamen as the associate producer.

The opening track "Birds of a Feather" had already appeared a year earlier in 1977, performed by its composers Carole Pope and Kevan Staples on Rough Trade Live! Direct to Disc, the debut album of their band Rough Trade. The song "Sloe Gin" was written for Curry by Ezrin and Kamen, and later covered by Joe Bonamassa in 2007 on his album of the same title.

== Track listing ==
=== Side A ===
1. "Birds of a Feather" (Carole Pope, Kevan Staples) – 4:07
2. "Wake Nicodemus" (Henry Clay Work, originally published in 1864) – 4:37
3. "I Will" (John Lennon, Paul McCartney) – 3:41
4. "Brontosaurus" (Roy Wood) – 4:38
5. "Alan" (Tony Kosinec) – 4:25

=== Side B ===
1. "All I Want" (Joni Mitchell) – 4:24
2. "Sloe Gin" (Bob Ezrin, Michael Kamen) – 5:25
3. "Harlem on My Mind" (Irving Berlin) – 3:51
4. "Anyone Who Had a Heart" (Burt Bacharach, Hal David) – 3:44

== Personnel ==
- Tim Curry – vocals
- Dick Wagner – lead and rhythm guitar
- Nils Lofgren – accordion
- Tony Kosinec – acoustic guitar
- Bob Babbitt – bass guitar
- Charles Collins, Allan Schwartzberg – drums
- John Tropea – rhythm guitar
- Robin Millar – rhythm guitar, mandolin
- Don Frank Brooks (Don F Brooks) – harmonica
- Lee Michaels – keyboards
- Michael Kamen – keyboards, arrangements
- Bob Ezrin – keyboards, percussion, backing vocals, arrangements
- Jimmy Maelen – percussion
- Ernie Watts – saxophone
- Max Kaminsky – trumpet
- Joe Venuti – violin
- Rudy Toth – cimbalom
- The Regimental Pipes And Drums of the 48th Highlanders of Canada
- Brooks Hunnicutt, Dennis Tufano - backing vocals
- Elizabeth Lennard – photography
