= Jewels (novel) =

1992 novel by Danielle Steel

- US first edition cover
- Author: Danielle Steel
- Language: English
- Genre: Historical romance
- Publisher: Delacorte Press
- Publication date: May 1, 1992
- Publication place: United States
- Media type: Print (hardback & paperback)
- Pages: 471
- ISBN: 978-0440214229

Jewels is a 1992 historical romance novel by Danielle Steel. It is Steel's 30th novel.

The novel debuted at #1 on the New York Times Best Seller list and remained in that spot for four weeks. It was a paperback bestseller as well, reaching #5 for two weeks.

Jewels was adapted by Shelley List and Jonathan Estrin into a 1992 NBC television miniseries starring Annette O'Toole and Anthony Andrews.

== Plot ==
In this story, seventy-five-year-old Sarah, Duchess of Whitfield, reflects on her life.

The daughter of a wealthy American family in New York in the 1930s, Sarah marries Freddie. With little interest in her, he drinks all night and associates with prostitutes. Sarah becomes pregnant but miscarries, and she and Freddie divorce. Her parents drag a listless Sarah to Europe, where well-meaning friends and family force their nephews, sons and grandsons on her. She meets William Whitfield, the Duke of Whitfield, 13th in line for succession to the British throne. Captivated by him, she becomes his companion in London. William casts aside her fears of a public scandal and convinces Sarah to marry him.

On their honeymoon in France, Sarah and William happen upon Chateau de la Meuze, which he later buys for her as a Christmas present. Sarah works hard to restore the estate, but World War II erupts. After the birth of their first child, Phillip, William reluctantly leaves to join the Royal Air Force when England declares war on Germany. The Germans take possession of France, and German troops, led by the courtly commandant Joachim von Mannheim, seize the chateau to establish a care center for the wounded and dying soldiers. Sarah and Phillip are removed to the caretaker's cottage. Joachim falls in love with Sarah, who remains faithful to William. Pregnant, she gives birth to her and William's daughter Elizabeth, who soon dies of a fever, due to a lack of medical supplies.

Joachim leaves. William returns from the war, having lost the use of his legs. Sarah and William help impoverished war survivors by purchasing their jewelry, and eventually put their collection up for sale in a Paris shop. The business is a success, expanding across Europe and becoming jewelers to the crown. Sarah and William have three more children — Julian, Isabelle and Xavier — but William dies on the night of Xavier's first birthday.

After his funeral, Joachim returns, only to find that Sarah has no place in her heart for another man. She directs her attentions to her business and her children, each challenging in their own way.

== Adaptation ==
Jewels was adapted by Shelley List and Jonathan Estrin into a 1992 NBC television miniseries starring Annette O'Toole as Sarah and Anthony Andrews as William. Directed by Roger Young, the miniseries premiered on NBC on October 18, 1992. It was nominated for a Golden Globe Award for Best Mini-Series or Motion Picture Made for TV, and Andrews was nominated for a Golden Globe for Best Performance by an Actor in a Mini-Series or Motion Picture Made for TV. Composer Patrick Williams won a Primetime Emmy Award for Outstanding Individual Achievement in Music Composition for a Miniseries or a Special for Part I.

== Critical reception ==
Jewels debuted at #1 on the New York Times Best Seller list, and remained in that spot for four weeks. It was a paperback bestseller as well, reaching #5 for two weeks.

Publishers Weekly called the novel "bland", noting that "the narrative's greatest conflict comes in the final chapters, when widowed Sarah has to deal with her unruly offspring. Costume jewelry has more sparkle than this uninspired tale."
