= Tim Curry =

British actor (1946–2026)

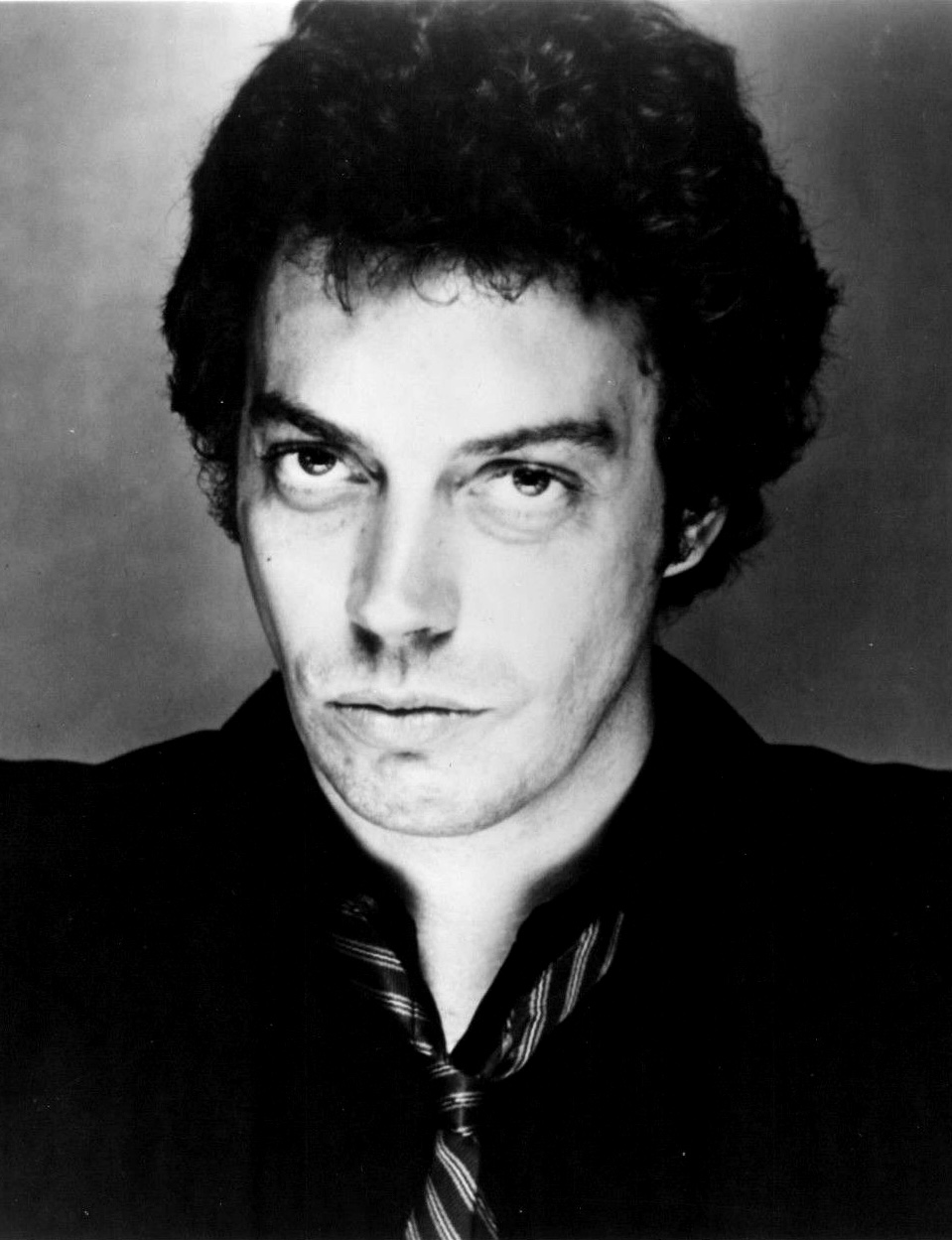
- Curry in 1978
- Born: Timothy James Curry; 19 April 1946; Grappenhall, Cheshire, England
- Died: 25 August 2026 (aged 80); Los Angeles, California, US
- Education: University of Birmingham (BA)
- Occupations: Actor; singer
- Years active: 1968–2026
- Works: Full list

Timothy James Curry (19 April 1946 – 25 August 2026) was an English actor and singer who amassed more than 240 credits on screen and stage in a career that spanned nearly 60 years. Curry made his acting debut in the West End production of Hair (1968–1969) and gained wide recognition for portraying Dr. Frank-N-Furter in The Rocky Horror Show (1973–1975) and its 1975 film adaptation The Rocky Horror Picture Show. He received three Tony nominations for his Broadway performances in Amadeus (1980–1981) as Wolfgang Amadeus Mozart, My Favorite Year (1992–1993) as Alan Swann, and Spamalot (2005) as King Arthur; and two Olivier nominations for West End productions of The Pirates of Penzance (1982) and Spamalot (2006–2007).

In film, Curry starred as Rooster Hannigan in Annie (1982), the Lord of Darkness in Legend (1985), Wadsworth in Clue (1985), the Concierge in Home Alone 2: Lost in New York (1992), Cardinal Richelieu in The Three Musketeers (1993), and Long John Silver in Muppet Treasure Island (1996). Other film credits include The Worst Witch (1986), The Hunt for Red October (1990), Congo (1995), Charlie's Angels (2000), Scary Movie 2 (2001), and Kinsey (2004). On television, he played Pennywise in the miniseries It (1990) and earned a Primetime Emmy Award nomination for his role as a family of hillbillies in the HBO anthology series Tales from the Crypt (1993).

A prolific voice-over performer, Curry won a Daytime Emmy Award for voicing Captain Hook on Peter Pan & the Pirates (1990–1991) and was Grammy-nominated for his audiobook reading of A Series of Unfortunate Events: The Bad Beginning (2001). He also voiced Hexxus in FernGully: The Last Rainforest (1992), Sir Nigel Thornberry in The Wild Thornberrys (1998–2004), Doviculus in Brütal Legend (2009), and Chancellor Palpatine / Darth Sidious in Star Wars: The Clone Wars (2012–2014). Outside of acting, he released three studio albums: Read My Lips (1978), Fearless (1979), and Simplicity (1981), with the latter two charting on the US Billboard 200. His memoir Vagabond was published in 2025, for which he posthumously received his second Grammy Award nomination, for Best Audio Book, Narration & Storytelling Recording.

== Early life and education ==
Timothy James Curry was born on 19 April 1946 in Grappenhall, Cheshire, the son of school secretary Patricia (née Langmead) and Royal Navy chaplain James Curry. He had an elder sister, Judith. Within a year of Curry's birth, the family moved to Hong Kong. During his early childhood, the family moved to a different British seaside town every 18 months to follow his father's career, eventually settling in Plymouth when Curry was 11.

Curry's father suffered a stroke in 1958 and died several weeks later in the hospital from complications of pneumonia, aged 49. Curry later attended Kingswood School in Bath, Somerset. In church choirs, he developed into a boy soprano. Deciding to concentrate on acting, he graduated from the University of Birmingham with a combined Bachelor of Arts degree in English and drama in 1968.

== Career ==
=== 1968–1975: Breakthrough with Hair and The Rocky Horror Picture Show ===
Curry's first full-time role was as part of the original London cast of the musical Hair in 1968, where he met Richard O'Brien, who went on to write Curry's role of Dr Frank-N-Furter in The Rocky Horror Show (1973). After Hair, Curry continued to perform in theatre productions at venues such as the Royal Court Theatre in London and the Citizens Theatre in Glasgow.

Curry recalled his first encounter with The Rocky Horror Show:

I'd heard about the play because I lived on Paddington Street, off Baker Street, and there was an old gym a few doors away. I saw Richard O'Brien in the street, and he said he'd just been to the gym to see if he could find a muscleman who could sing. I said, "Why do you need him to sing?" [laughs] And he told me that his musical was going to be done, and I should talk to Jim Sharman. He gave me the script, and I thought, "Boy, if this works, it's going to be a smash."

Originally, Curry rehearsed the character with a German accent and peroxide blond hair, and later, with an American accent. In March 2005, in an interview with Terry Gross of NPR's Fresh Air, he explained that he decided to play Dr Frank-N-Furter with an English accent after listening to an English woman say, "Do you have a house in town or a house in the country?," and decided, "Yes, [Frank-N-Furter] should sound like the Queen."

He originally thought the character was merely a laboratory doctor dressed in a white lab coat. However, at the suggestion of director Sharman, the character evolved into the diabolical mad scientist and transvestite with an upper-class Belgravia accent. An immediate hit, a reviewer at the premiere in London in June 1973 wrote that Curry gives a "garishly Bowiesque performance as the ambisextrous doctor". This change carried over to the 1975 film adaptation, The Rocky Horror Picture Show, which made Curry a household name and gave him a cult following. Curry continued to play the character in London, Los Angeles, and New York City until 1975.

In an interview with Fresh Air, Curry called Rocky Horror a "rite of passage", and added that the film is "a guaranteed weekend party to which you can go with or without a date and probably find one if you don't have one, and it's also a chance for people to try on a few roles for size, you know? Figure out, help them maybe figure out their own sexuality."

During the original run of Rocky Horror, Curry's television career also began to flourish. He played Eugene in Napoleon and Love (1974), and had guest roles in Armchair Theatre and the BBC's Play for Today, the latter being a production of Dennis Potter's teleplay Schmoedipus (1974).

=== 1975–1989: Further acting and studio albums ===
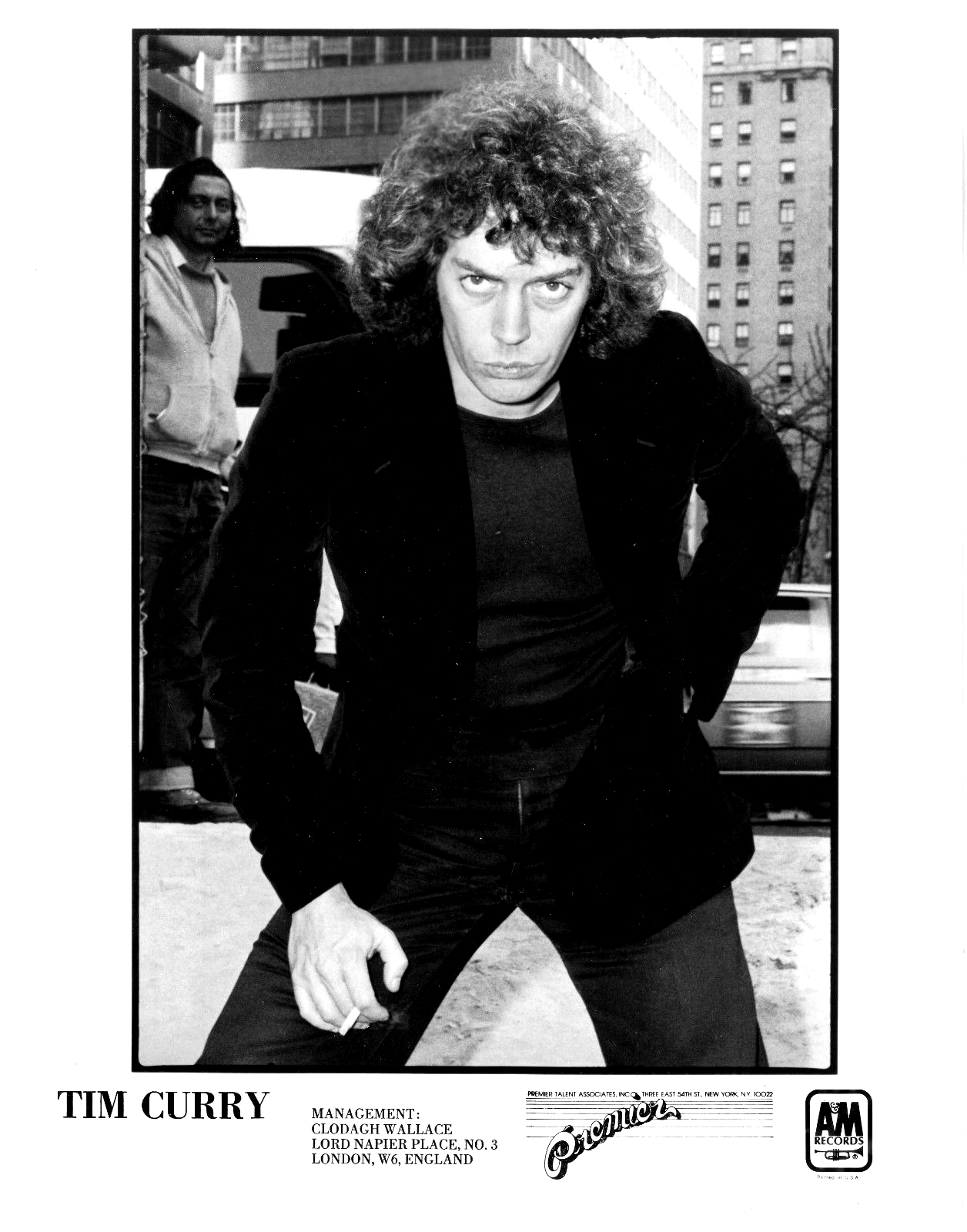
Curry in a promotional photo of his second studio album Fearless (1979)

Curry's first role after Rocky Horror's run on Broadway was in Stephen Frears's 1975 adaptation of Three Men in a Boat, scripted by Tom Stoppard. This collaboration led to Curry's return to the stage with Stoppard's Travesties, which ran in London and New York from 1975 to 1976. Travesties was a Broadway hit. It won two Tony Awards (Best Performance by an Actor for John Wood and Best Play), as well as the New York Drama Critics Circle Award (Best Play), and Curry's performance as the famous dadaist Tristan Tzara received good reviews.

Around this time, Curry launched his solo musical artist career. Curry received classical vocal training as a boy. He mentioned that his musical influences included jazz vocalists such as Billie Holiday and Louis Armstrong, and he idolised The Beatles and The Rolling Stones as a teenager. He first recorded a nine-track album for Ode Records in 1976. However, the album remained unreleased in its entirety until February 2010, when it was made available as a legal download entitled ...From the Vaults. The album, produced by Lou Adler, included Curry's rendition of the Supremes' hit "Baby Love". In 1978, A&M Records released Curry's official debut solo album Read My Lips. The album featured an eclectic range of songs (mostly covers) performed in diverse genres. Highlights of the album are a reggae version of the Beatles' song "I Will," a rendition of "Wake Nicodemus" featuring the Pipes and Drums of the 48th Highlanders of Canada, and a barroom ballad, "Alan", composed by Canadian singer-songwriter Tony Kosinec. The following year, Curry released his second and most successful album Fearless. The LP was more rock-oriented than Read My Lips and mostly featured original songs rather than cover versions. The album included Curry's only US Billboard Hot 100 charting song: "I Do the Rock". Curry toured North America and some European countries with his band between 1978 and 1980. Curry's third album, Simplicity, was released in 1981, again by A&M Records. This record, which did not sell as well as the previous offerings, combined both original songs and cover versions. Still, it was the only Curry recording to hit the charts in Canada, reaching number 45 on the album chart.

In 1980, Curry formed part of the original cast in Peter Hall's Broadway production of Peter Shaffer's Amadeus, playing the title character, Wolfgang Amadeus Mozart. Curry was nominated for his first Tony Award (Best Performance by a Leading Actor in a Play) for this role but lost out to his co-star Ian McKellen, who played Antonio Salieri. In 1982, Curry returned to the London stage to play the Pirate King in the Drury Lane production of Joe Papp's version of Gilbert and Sullivan's The Pirates of Penzance opposite George Cole and Pamela Stephenson, earning enthusiastic reviews. In 1983, Curry performed in The Rivals at the Royal National Theatre of Great Britain, alongside Michael Hordern, Geraldine McEwan, Anne Louise Lambert, and Fiona Shaw. From 1985 to 1986 he performed at the National as Macheath in The Threepenny Opera, in Stoppard's Dalliance, and Love For Love. All four National productions were directed by his Travesties director Peter Wood.

Curry had further roles in film and television throughout the 1970s and 1980s, including William Shakespeare in the John Mortimer-scripted mini-series Will Shakespeare (1978), Robert Graves in the Jerzy Skolimowski horror film The Shout (1978), Leonard Brazil in Stephen Poliakoff's City Sugar (1978), Johnny LaGuardia in Times Square (1980), Daniel Francis "Rooster" Hannigan in John Huston's 1982 film version of Annie, Bill Sikes in Oliver Twist (1982), Jeremy Hancock in Richard Eyre's political film The Ploughman's Lunch (1983) written by Ian McEwan, aspiring actor-singer Larry Gormley in Blue Money (1985), and as the Grand Wizard in the children's Halloween film The Worst Witch (1986). In 1985, Curry starred in the fantasy film Legend as The Lord of Darkness. Director Ridley Scott cast Curry in the film after watching him in Rocky Horror, thinking he was ideal to play the role of Darkness. It took five and a half hours to apply the makeup needed for Darkness onto Curry, and at the end of the day, he would spend an hour in a bath to liquefy the soluble spirit gum. The same year, Curry appeared in the comedy mystery film Clue as Wadsworth the butler.

From 1987 to 1988, he did the American National Tour of Me and My Girl in the lead role of Bill Snibson, a role originated on Broadway by Robert Lindsay. In 1989, Curry returned once again to the New York stage in the Off-Broadway production of The Art of Success.

In 1989, A&M released The Best of Tim Curry on CD and cassette, featuring songs from his albums (including a live version of "Alan") and a previously unreleased song, a live cover version of Bob Dylan's "Simple Twist of Fate".

=== 1989–2003: Hollywood career ===
Curry moved permanently to the United States in the late 1980s and began to appear more frequently in Hollywood film productions, including comedic roles such as Dr Thornton Poole in John Landis's Oscar (1991), the suspicious Plaza Hotel concierge in Home Alone 2: Lost in New York (1992), Jigsaw in Loaded Weapon 1 (1993), and Long John Silver in Muppet Treasure Island (1996). Curry also appeared in action films, such as the John McTiernan-directed thriller The Hunt for Red October (1990) as Dr Yevgeni Petrov, the 1993 adaptation of The Three Musketeers as Cardinal Richelieu, the superhero film The Shadow (1994) as Farley Claymore, and the adventure film Congo (1995) as Romanian philanthropist Herkermer Homolka. He also starred in the 1998 direct-to-video film Addams Family Reunion playing Gomez Addams.

Focusing on film, Curry's stage performances decreased, but he did perform as the Prosecutor in Roger Waters's 1990 production of The Wall – Live in Berlin, and in 1992 he played Alan Swann in the Broadway version of My Favorite Year, earning him his second Tony Award nomination, this time for Best Performance by a Leading Actor in a Musical. In 2001, Curry returned to the theatre, appearing as Scrooge in a musical version of Charles Dickens's A Christmas Carol which played at Madison Square Garden.

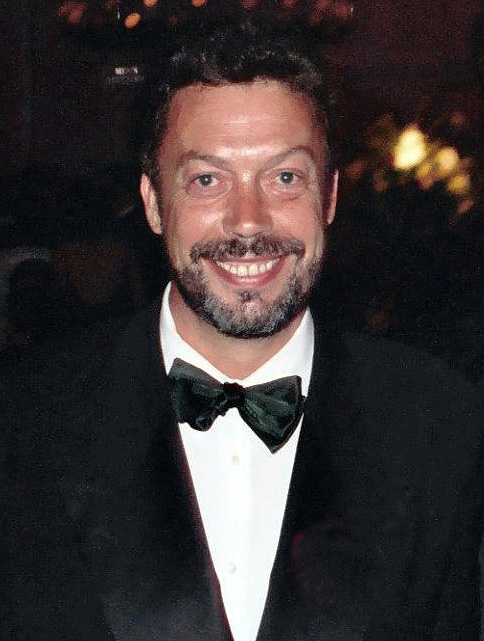
Curry at the 1995 Emmy Awards

On American television during this time, he appeared in the "Dead Dog Records" storyline of the television series crime drama Wiseguy (1989) as Winston Newquay, and was nominated for a Primetime Emmy Award for Outstanding Guest Actor in a Drama Series for portraying all three members of a deranged family in Tales from the Crypt (1993). He also had recurring roles on the short-lived science fiction television series Earth 2 (1994), and the sitcom Rude Awakening (1999–2000). Although Curry appeared in numerous television series throughout his career, he only had lead roles in two live-action series: Over the Top (1997), a sitcom that he also produced, and the revival series of Family Affair (2002–2003). Both were cancelled after one season. One of Curry's best-known television roles is as Pennywise the Clown in the horror miniseries Stephen King's It (1990). Aside from one Fangoria interview in 1990, Curry never publicly acknowledged his involvement in It until an interview with Moviefone in 2015, where he called the role of Pennywise "a wonderful part".

When he moved to America, Curry started performing voice overs for many animated productions, video games and audiobooks, starting with the performance of the Serpent in The Greatest Adventure: Stories from the Bible (1988). Curry won a Daytime Emmy Award for his performance as Captain Hook in the Fox animated series Peter Pan and the Pirates (1990–1991) and received a second Daytime Emmy nomination for voicing Skullmaster in Mighty Max (1993–1994). His longest-running animated role was as Nigel Thornberry in The Wild Thornberrys (1998–2004), which ran for five seasons on Nickelodeon. Other voice roles include MAL in Captain Planet and the Planeteers (1991–1996), the titular character in the video games Gabriel Knight: Sins of the Fathers (1993) and Gabriel Knight 3: Blood of the Sacred, Blood of the Damned (1999), Zimbo in Aaahh!!! Real Monsters (1994–1997), King Chicken in Duckman (1994–1997), Dr Anton Sevarius in Gargoyles (1995–1996), Slagar the Cruel in Redwall (2000–2001), and Professor Finbarr Calamitous in The Adventures of Jimmy Neutron: Boy Genius (2003–2005). Curry also did voice acting in a number of animated films, such as FernGully: The Last Rainforest (1992); Don Bluth's The Pebble and the Penguin (1995); Beauty and the Beast: The Enchanted Christmas (1997), for which he received an Annie Award nomination; Scooby-Doo! and the Witch's Ghost (1999); the first Barbie film, Barbie in the Nutcracker (2001); and reprising his role of Nigel Thornberry in The Wild Thornberrys Movie (2002) and Rugrats Go Wild (2003). Curry's audiobook work includes the Richard Jury mystery series, Anne Rice's Cry to Heaven, the Prelude to Dune prequel trilogy, the original The Old Kingdom trilogy, and his Grammy-nominated narration of Lemony Snicket's A Series of Unfortunate Events.

In the early 2000s, Curry's big screen appearances lessened, but he did portray Roger Corwin in the film adaptation of Charlie's Angels (2000), Professor Oldman in the parody film Scary Movie 2 (2001), and Thurman Rice in the biographical film Kinsey (2004).

=== 2004–2012: Spamalot and later roles ===
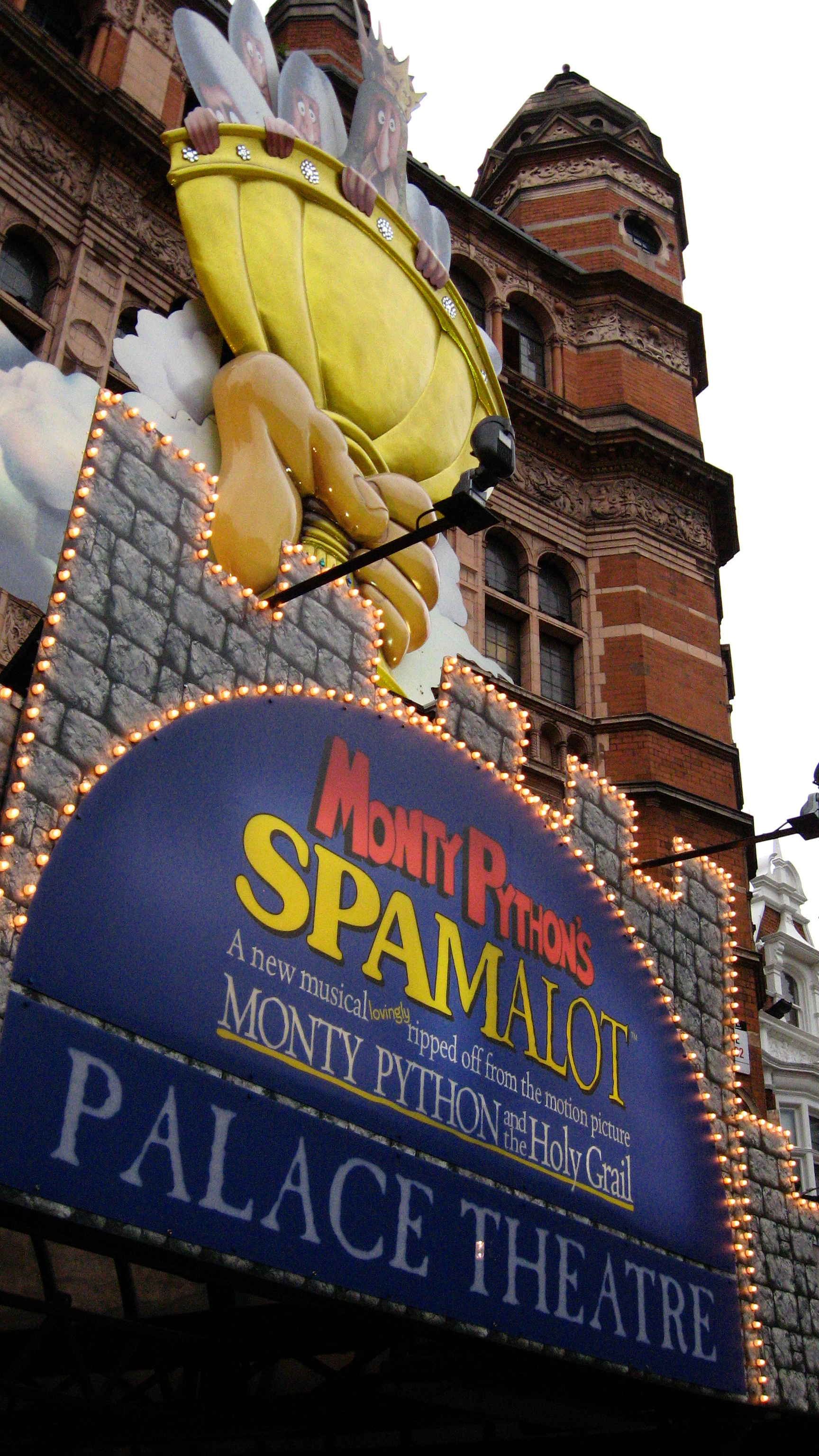
Spamalot playing at the Palace Theatre in London where Curry reprised his role as King Arthur

In 2004, Curry began his role of King Arthur in Spamalot in Chicago. Directed by Mike Nichols, written by Monty Python member Eric Idle and based on Monty Python and the Holy Grail, the show successfully moved to Broadway in February 2005. It sold more than $1 million worth of tickets in its first 24 hours. His performance brought him a third Tony nomination, again for Best Performance by a Leading Actor in a Musical. Curry reprised this role at the Palace Theatre in the West End, where Spamalot opened on 16 October 2006. His final performance came on 6 January 2007. Curry was nominated for a Laurence Olivier Award for his work in Spamalot, and he also won the Theatregoers' Choice Award (receiving 39% of the votes cast by over 12,000 theatregoers) as Best Actor in a Musical.

After Spamalot, he returned to working on British television, with the miniseries adaptation of Terry Pratchett's The Colour of Magic (2008), a guest appearance on the long-running Agatha Christie's Poirot (2008), and the miniseries Return to Cranford (2009). Curry also made a single-episode appearance on the comedy-detective series Psych (2007), directed by his Oscar director John Landis. His final episodic television role was in 2010 on Criminal Minds, portraying unsub Billy Flynn in two episodes. Curry's voice work also continued, with the English dub of Studio Ghibli's The Cat Returns (2005); Garfield: A Tail of Two Kitties (2006); Tim Schafer's video game Brütal Legend (2009); the first game in the Dragon Age series, Dragon Age: Origins (2009); G. Gordon Godfrey in Young Justice (2012–2013); and the Sorcerer in Randy Cunningham: 9th Grade Ninja (2012–2014). The latter two roles were recast after Curry had his stroke. He also became the voice of Chancellor Palpatine/Darth Sidious in Star Wars: The Clone Wars upon the death of Ian Abercrombie. Curry's performance as Premier Anatoly Cherdenko in the live-action cut scenes in Command & Conquer: Red Alert 3 (2008) went viral as a meme.

His last major role in a feature film was as Alexander Monro in the British black comedy Burke & Hare (2010), reuniting him once again with director John Landis. From May to August 2011, Curry was scheduled to portray the Player in a Trevor Nunn stage production of Tom Stoppard's Rosencrantz and Guildenstern Are Dead at the Chichester Festival Theatre and then in London. This would be his fourth time performing a Stoppard piece. Curry withdrew from the production on 27 May, citing ill health but later admitting that he was fired for being unable to memorise his lines. From 26 to 29 April 2012, he appeared in Eric Idle's play What About Dick? at the Orpheum Theatre in Los Angeles. Curry had originally appeared at a script reading for the play back in 2007 when it was still a work in progress.

=== 2013–2026: Final years ===
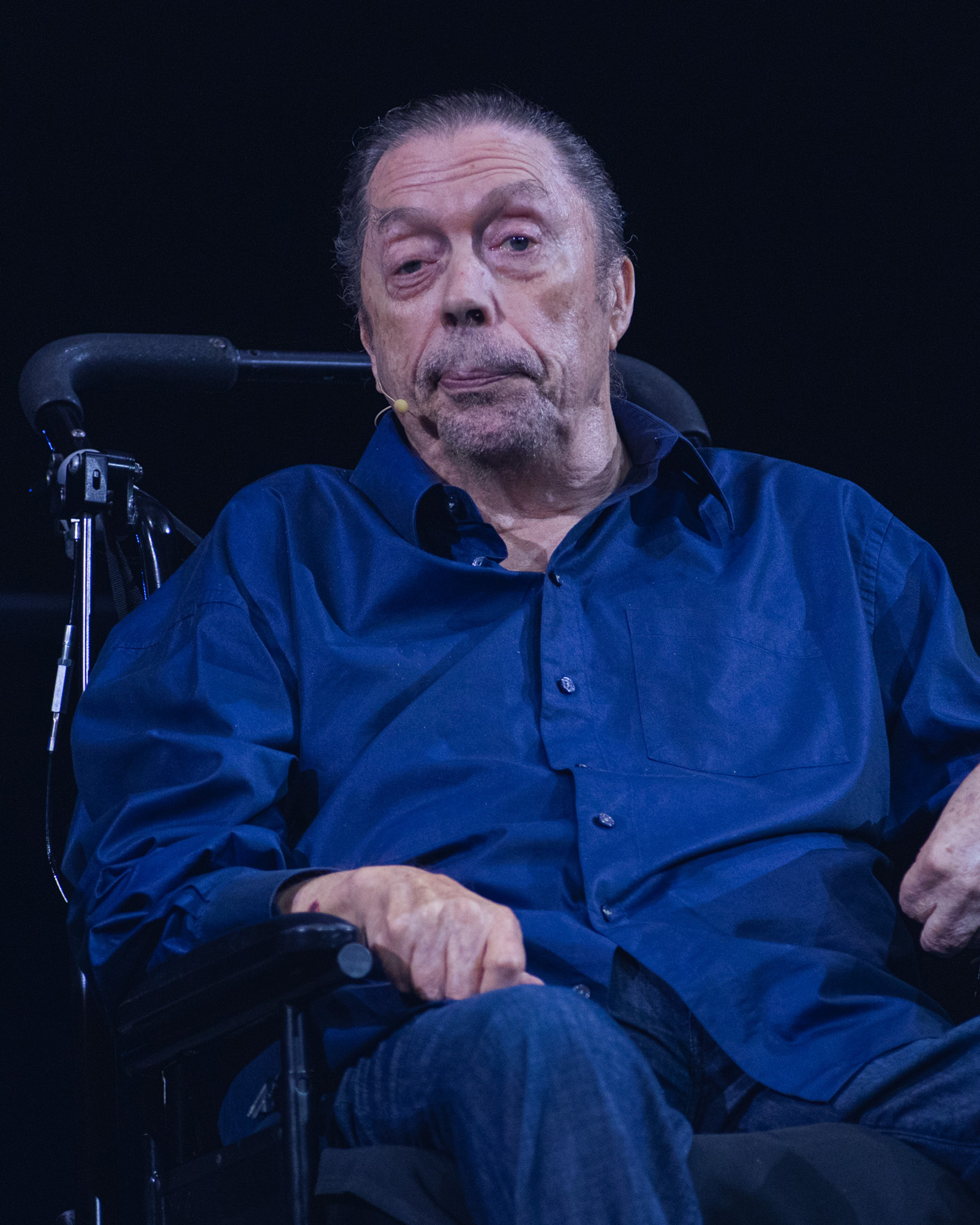
Curry in 2025

Following his 2012 stroke, Curry continued to work in voice-over, portraying Auntie Whispers on the Primetime Creative Arts Emmy-winning miniseries Over the Garden Wall (2014) and narrating an advertisement for Paramount Network. He also occasionally performed as a singer alongside Jamie Donnelly at the Rockwell Table & Stage cabaret venue in Los Angeles, singing Broadway tunes and original music. Curry's career in theatre was honoured on 7 June 2015 at the Actors Fund's 19th annual Tony Awards Viewing Party, where he was awarded an Artistic Achievement Award.

In 2016, Curry played the Criminologist in the television film remake of The Rocky Horror Picture Show. This was his last onscreen performance. Four years later, Curry reprised his role as Dr Frank-N-Furter in The Rocky Horror Show Livestream, a read-through of the show in support of the Democratic Party of Wisconsin to raise funds for Joe Biden's presidential campaign. In 2025, Curry was an invited guest speaker at the Academy Museum of Motion Pictures to celebrate the 50th anniversary of The Rocky Horror Picture Show.

During 2024, Curry made a voice cameo appearance in the mid-credits of the horror film Stream, portraying the masked character "Lockwood". Before dying in 2026, Curry completed work on Stream 2: Sudden Death and also a Netflix animated special reimagining of Barbie in the Nutcracker (2026).

Curry's memoir Vagabond was released by Grand Central Publishing on 14 October 2025, for which he was posthumously nominated for the Grammy Award for Best Audio Book, Narration & Storytelling Recording for his audiobook reading. Asked by a fan about the origin of the title, Curry said: "because in the 17th century in the criminal code, actors were lumped together with thieves and vagabonds".

== Personal life ==
Curry lived in Los Angeles from 1988 until his death in 2026. He kept his love life private, and never married or had children.

As a keen horticulturalist, Curry developed and restored gardens across many of his past and other residences in Los Angeles. On where his interest in gardening came from, he commented: "I think if you're English, a trowel appears in your hand when you're 30 like a prosthetic device".

A heavy cigarette smoker, Curry stated that he had used hashish and cocaine. He also spent time in alcohol rehabilitation, but did not consider himself an alcoholic.

== Health and death ==
On 13 July 2012, while receiving a massage, Curry suffered a major stroke which required brain surgery. He used a wheelchair afterwards and continued to experience speech and mobility issues, particularly in his left arm and leg. It also affected his short-term memory. In September 2025, Curry said he was still unable to walk, but his facial control had visibly improved.

In an interview with CBS Sunday Morning in October 2025, Curry said "I don't fear death. I try to avoid it, as I think we all do. But, I suspect that in the end, I will welcome it." He died on 25 August 2026 at his home in Toluca Lake, Los Angeles, at the age of 80. His cause of death was later disclosed as coronary artery disease, with his stroke and kidney cancer being contributing factors.

== Legacy ==
Following his death, The New York Times praised Curry's "gift for garish eccentricity" while also noting that he was a "favourite in roles calling for expressive villainy or general cartoonishness". CNN called Curry a "massively popular cult figure" for his roles across a variety of genres. Rolling Stone also called Curry a "genuine pop-culture icon" who had been "assured a place in cinema-history books".

== Awards and nominations ==
Organisations	Year	Category	Work	Result	Ref.
Actors Fund of America	2015	Artistic Achievement Award	Himself	Honoured	
American Comedy Award	1993	Funniest Supporting Actor in a Motion Picture	Passed Away	Nominated	
Annie Award	1998	Voice Acting in a Feature Production	Beauty and the Beast: The Enchanted Christmas	Nominated	
CableACE Award	1995	Best Actor in a Dramatic Series	Tales from the Crypt	Nominated	
Daytime Emmy Award	1991	Outstanding Performer in a Children's Series	Peter Pan and the Pirates	Won	
Daytime Emmy Award	1995	Outstanding Performer in an Animated Program	Mighty Max	Nominated	
Drama Desk Award	1975	Best Actor in a Musical	The Rocky Horror Show	Nominated	
Drama Desk Award	1981	Best Actor in a Play	Amadeus	Nominated	
Grammy Award	2002	Best Spoken Word Album for Children	A Series of Unfortunate Events: The Bad Beginning	Nominated	
Grammy Award	2027	Best Audio Book, Narration & Storytelling Recording	Vagabond	Pending	
Laurence Olivier Award	1982	Best Actor in a Musical	The Pirates of Penzance	Nominated	
Laurence Olivier Award	2007	Best Actor in a Musical	Spamalot	Nominated	
Outer Critics Circle Award	2005	Outstanding Actor in a Musical	Spamalot	Nominated	
Primetime Emmy Award	1994	Outstanding Guest Actor in a Drama Series	Tales from the Crypt (for "Death of Some Salesman")	Nominated	
Royal Variety Club Award	1982	Stage Actor of the Year	The Pirates of Penzance	Won	
Tony Award	1981	Best Actor in a Play	Amadeus	Nominated	
Tony Award	1993	Best Actor in a Musical	My Favorite Year	Nominated	
Tony Award	2005	Best Actor in a Musical	Spamalot	Nominated	
WhatsOnStage Award	2007	Best Actor in a Musical	Spamalot	Won	
