= Psych (film series) =

American comedy-drama mystery film series

- Official film series logo
- Based on: Psych by Steve Franks
- Distributed by: Universal Pictures
- Country: United States
- Language: English

Psych is a series of comedy-drama mystery films, based on and serving as a continuation of the USA Network television series of the same name. Beginning with the 2017 film Psych: The Movie, the series has seen favorable critical reception with the Peacock streaming service ordering all films succeeding the first.

The first sequel, Psych 2: Lassie Come Home, was released in 2020, with the third film, Psych 3: This Is Gus, following in 2021. Three further films are in development.

== Origin ==
Once production on the dramedy television series Psych wrapped, series creator Steve Franks immediately had the idea to bring the Psych universe back in film form later on. On May 8, 2017, USA Network confirmed that a film continuation would be produced for the network, directed by Franks and co-written with series star James Roday, with all the series' main cast returning. All subsequent films would be ordered by and released to the streaming service Peacock.

== Films ==
Film	U.S. release date	Director	Screenwriter(s)	Story by	Producer(s)	Status
Psych: The Movie	December 7, 2017	Steve Franks	Steve Franks & James Roday Rodriguez	Steve Franks	James Roday Rodriguez, Dulé Hill, Steve Franks, Chris Henze, Kelly Kulchak, and Chris Cheramie	Released
Psych 2: Lassie Come Home	July 15, 2020	Steve Franks	Steve Franks & James Roday Rodriguez & Andy Berman	Steve Franks	James Roday Rodriguez, Dulé Hill, Steve Franks, Chris Henze, Kelly Kulchak, and Chris Cheramie	Released
Psych 3: This Is Gus	November 18, 2021	Steve Franks	Steve Franks & James Roday Rodriguez	Steve Franks	James Roday Rodriguez, Dulé Hill, Steve Franks, Chris Henze, Kelly Kulchak, and Chris Cheramie	Released
Psych 4	TBA	Steve Franks	Steve Franks & James Roday Rodriguez	Steve Franks	James Roday Rodriguez, Dulé Hill, Steve Franks, Chris Henze, Kelly Kulchak, and Chris Cheramie	In development

=== Psych: The Movie (2017) ===
On May 8, 2017, USA Network announced Psych: The Movie, a two-hour film continuation of Psych to air December 7, 2017. All the original main cast would return for the film, which was directed by series creator Steve Franks and written by Franks and series star, James Roday Rodriguez. Zachary Levi was later announced for the film as the main villain, "Thin White Duke", while Jazmyn Simon – Dulé Hill's real-life fiancée – played Selene, a romantic interest for Gus. On July 5, 2017, Charlotte Flair announced that she would be in Psych: The Movie as Heather Rockrear.

On June 28, 2017, former guest star Ralph Macchio joined the cast reprising his role as Nick Conforth, the police academy officer who trained Shawn and Gus in season 5. Principal photography took place from May 25 to June 18 in Vancouver, British Columbia. It was later announced that Timothy Omundson would have a reduced role due to a stroke, but would still appear. In addition, Kurt Fuller, John Cena and Jimmi Simpson were confirmed to be reprising their respective roles of Woody Strode, Ewan O'Hara and Mary Lightly.

=== Psych 2: Lassie Come Home (2020) ===
On February 14, 2019, it was announced Psych: The Movie 2 was greenlit and all the main cast would return, set to premiere in 2019. On April 18, 2019, it was announced Joel McHale would be joining the film, as well as Jimmi Simpson, reprising his recurring role as Mary Lightly. On September 17, 2019, it was announced that the sequel had been renamed Psych 2: Lassie Come Home and would instead be airing on NBCUniversal's new streaming service, Peacock. Consequently, the film only debuted after the streaming service launched. In a November 2019 interview with Larry King, Timothy Omundson revealed that the film would revolve around the characters rallying together in support of Lassie's recovery following a stroke, mirroring Omundson's real-life stroke which led to his reduced presence in Psych: The Movie.

=== Psych 3: This Is Gus (2021) ===
On May 13, 2021, Peacock announced a third film, Psych 3: This Is Gus, with production set to begin in the summer. On October 9, 2021, at New York Comic Con, it was announced the film will premiere on November 18, 2021. Along with the returning main cast, Kurt Fuller would reprise his role as Woody Strode and Curt Smith would return as himself.

=== Future ===
Three further Psych films are in development, with John Cena intended to reprise his role.

== Principal cast and characters ==
List indicators

This section includes characters who will appear or have appeared in the series.

- An empty grey cell indicates the character was not in the film, or that the character's official presence has not yet been confirmed.
- ^{C} indicates a cameo role.
- ^{E} indicates an appearance not included in the theatrical cut.
- ^{P} indicates an appearance in onscreen photographs.

Character	Films			
Character	Psych: The Movie	Psych 2: Lassie Come Home	Psych 3: This Is Gus	Psych 4
Shawn Spencer	James Roday Rodriguez	James Roday Rodriguez	James Roday Rodriguez	James Roday Rodriguez
Burton "Gus" Guster	Dulé Hill	Dulé Hill	Dulé Hill	Dulé Hill
Selene Guster	Jazmyn Simon	Jazmyn Simon	Jazmyn Simon	Jazmyn Simon
Carlton "Lassie" Lassiter	Timothy Omundson^{C}	Timothy Omundson	Timothy Omundson	TBA
Henry Spencer	Corbin Bernsen	Corbin Bernsen	Corbin Bernsen	TBA
Juliet "Jules" O'Hara	Maggie Lawson	Maggie Lawson	Maggie Lawson	TBA
Chief Karen Vick	Kirsten Nelson	Kirsten Nelson	Kirsten Nelson	TBA
Buzz McNab	Sage Brocklebank	Sage Brocklebank	Sage Brocklebank	TBA
Woodrow "Woody" Strode	Kurt Fuller	Kurt Fuller	Kurt Fuller	TBA
Mary Lightly	Jimmi Simpson	Jimmi Simpson		TBA
Ewan O'Hara	John Cena			John Cena
Thin White Duke	Zachary Levi			
Nick Conforth	Ralph Macchio			
Dr. Butterfly McMillan	Julianna Guill			
El Proveedor	Robert LaSardo			
Heather Rockrear	Charlotte Flair			
Sam Sloane	Sam Huntington			
Allison Cowley	Mena Suvari			
Black Gentleman Ninja	Nathan Mitchell			
Lassiter's father		Joel McHale		
Nurse Dolores		Sarah Chalke		
Maisie		Allison Miller		
Wilkerson		Kadeem Hardison		
Ova		Christopher Heyerdahl		
Dr. Emile Herschel		Richard Schiff		
Marlowe Lassiter		Kristy Swanson		
Alan Decker			Allen Maldonado	
Curt Smith			Himself	
Father Westley			Ray Wise	
Lily Lassiter			Sophia Reid-Gantzert	

== Additional crew and production details ==
Film	Crew/Detail					
Film	Composer	Cinematographer	Editor	Production companies	Distributing company	Running time
Psych: The Movie	Adam Cohen & John Robert Wood	Scott Williams	David Crabtree	Pacific Mountain Productions; Thruline Entertainment; Universal Cable Productions	USA Network	1 hr 28 mins
Psych 2: Lassie Come Home	Adam Cohen & John Robert Wood	Scott Williams	David Crabtree & David Grecu	Pacific Mountain Productions; Thruline Entertainment; Universal Cable Productions	Peacock	1 hr 30 mins
Psych 3: This Is Gus	Adam Cohen & John Robert Wood	Scott Williams	David Crabtree	Pacific Mountain Productions; Thruline Entertainment; Universal Cable Productions	Peacock	1 hr 36 mins

== Reception ==
Critical and public response of Psych films
Title	Critical	
Title	Rotten Tomatoes	Metacritic
Psych: The Movie	100% (14 reviews)	66% (6 reviews)
Psych 2: Lassie Come Home	85% (13 reviews)	77% (5 reviews)
Psych 3: This Is Gus	80% (1 reviews)	—N/a

== Podcast ==
Launched in November 2021, Maggie Lawson and Timothy Omundson have hosted a weekly rewatch podcast of the Psych television and film series, entitled The Psychologists Are In: A Psych Rewatch. Episodes include plot recaps and behind-the-scenes memories from the two hosts. The series also features interviews with cast members, guest stars, and crew members, including writers, directors, and franchise creator Steve Franks.
