= Psych 3: This Is Gus =

2021 television film directed by Steve Franks

- Poster
- Genre: Detective fiction Comedy drama
- Based on: Psych by Steve Franks
- Written by: Steve Franks; James Roday Rodriguez
- Directed by: Steve Franks
- Starring: James Roday Rodriguez; Dulé Hill; Timothy Omundson; Maggie Lawson; Kirsten Nelson; Jazmyn Simon; Corbin Bernsen
- Theme music composer: Steve Franks
- Country of origin: United States
- Original language: English

Production
- Executive producers: James Roday Rodriguez; Dulé Hill; Steve Franks; Chris Henze; Kelly Kulchak
- Producer: Chris Cheramie
- Running time: 96 minutes
- Production companies: Pacific Mountain Productions; Thruline Entertainment; Universal Content Productions

Original release
- Network: Peacock
- Release: November 18, 2021

Psych 3: This Is Gus is a 2021 American mystery-comedy film. A direct sequel to the second film from 2020 and the third installment of the Psych film series, based on the USA Network dramedy series of the same name, the film was released on November 18, 2021 to the streaming service Peacock. James Roday Rodriguez, Dulé Hill, Timothy Omundson, Maggie Lawson, Kirsten Nelson, and Corbin Bernsen all reprised their roles from the series and previous two films, with recurring actor Kurt Fuller and previous guest star Curt Smith also appearing. The film was directed by series creator Steve Franks, who co-wrote the script with Roday Rodriguez, and plans to produce three further sequels.

== Plot ==
Following the events of Psych 2: Lassie Come Home, Gus and Selene's baby is almost due, but they haven't gotten married yet. Gus is planning the wedding down to the last detail, but they don't have a date because Selene is still married to her ex. Shawn wants to step in and track down the ex-husband, but Gus says Selene is handling her divorce and doesn't want them to get involved.

Ignoring Gus’s wishes, Shawn tries to get Jules to help him, but she trusts Selene and doesn't want to jeopardize her chance to be a godmother, especially since she and Shawn have decided they aren't going to have kids of their own. Shawn gets Chief Vick to let him use the police database and discovers that "Selene Gilmore" does not exist.

That night during a double date with Gus and Selene, Shawn steals Selene's purse to figure out her real identity. When Gus catches him, they have a drawn-out, slapstick fight over the purse. Gus eventually agrees that they can go ask Selene's sister a few questions.

Selene's sister turns out to be an actress who gives them Selene's former address. The duo investigate her old apartment and find a box containing fake IDs and a gun. They go to Henry Spencer's home for help and he tells them one ID is real, which leads them to Selene's husband Alan Decker.

Henry then takes the gun to Lassiter, who is still in recovery after his injury. In a heartfelt conversation with Henry, Lassiter realizes that his family is his core and perhaps he can let go of being a cop. Meanwhile, Selene had revealed her past to Jules and Chief Vick and the three set off in pursuit of Shawn and Gus.

Shawn and Gus find Alan Decker staking out a brewery and its CEO known as The Bull, who is a drug smuggler and arms dealer. Shawn and Gus agree to help Alan break into the brewery to get evidence of his crimes in return for Alan granting Selene a divorce.

The break-in goes well until The Bull is shot and it is revealed that Alan is the killer. Alan pulls a gun on Gus and Shawn and decides to frame them for the murder and kill them afterward. Alan reveals that his marriage to Selene wasn't legal, so Selene and Gus can get married, but Alan still wants Selene to be with him. Selene arrives and tries to get Alan to put the gun down. This nearly works, but Alan is still going to shoot them. In order to escape, Gus throws a gender reveal bomb at Alan, which explodes blue, and then knocks him out with his ventriloquist dummy.

Selene then goes into labor and, in the confusion to get out of the brewery, Gus locks himself, Selene, and Shawn into the brewery's panic room. However, in order to get married seconds before the baby is born, Gus managed to get two laptops inside, one with Curt Smith on zoom and the other with Father Westley. Father Westley marries Gus and Selene. Moments later, Shawn delivers their baby boy.

Chief Vick, Jules, and the paramedics rush in and congratulate Gus and Selene. Chief Vick also reveals that Alan escaped. The film ends with a parody of Wham!'s Last Christmas starring all the main cast plus Curt Smith, called Previous Holiday.

A post-credit scene reveals Alan in a photography darkroom developing photos of Selene, Gus, and their baby.

== Cast ==
- James Roday Rodriguez as Shawn Spencer
- Dulé Hill as Burton "Gus" Guster
- Timothy Omundson as Carlton Lassiter
- Maggie Lawson as Juliet "Jules" O'Hara
- Kirsten Nelson as Chief Karen Vick
- Jazmyn Simon as Selene
- Corbin Bernsen as Henry Spencer
- Kurt Fuller as Woody Strode
- Sage Brocklebank as Buzz McNab
- Allen Maldonado as Alan Decker
- Curt Smith as himself
- Ray Wise as Father Westley
- Sophia Reid-Gantzert as Lily Lassiter

== Production ==
On May 13, 2021, Peacock announced the film, with production set to begin in the summer. On October 9, 2021 at New York Comic Con, it was announced the film would premiere on November 18, 2021. Along with the returning main cast, Kurt Fuller reprised his role as Woody Strode and Curt Smith returned as himself.

== Reception ==
TV Guide rated the film a four and a half out of five.

== Future ==
Steve Franks has stated his intent for the Psych film series to consist of six films, of which This is Gus serves as the third.
