= Allen Maldonado =

American actor, filmmaker and entrepreneur

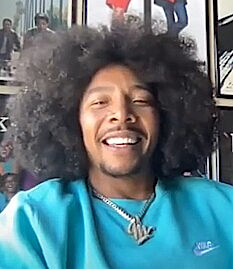
- Maldonado in 2022
- Born: May 20, 1983 (age 42); Bellflower, California, U.S.
- Occupations: Actor, Filmmaker, Entrepreneur
- Years active: 2002–present
- Website: Official website

Allen Maldonado (born May 20, 1983) is an American actor and filmmaker best known for his roles as Curtis in the ABC comedy Black-ish, Bobby in the TBS series The Last O.G., Rooster in the Starz drama series Heels, and Alan Decker in the Peacock original movie Psych 3: This Is Gus. He is also an entrepreneur and runs his own clothing line and an app called Everybody Digital.

== Life and career ==
Maldonado grew up in California. He was mostly raised by his mother, as he lost his father at a young age. Maldonado is of Puerto Rican and African-American descent.

His first big role was in Friday After Next and he credits Ice Cube for giving him his "first shot on set." Soon after, Maldonado began making short films that appeared at numerous film circuits and won various awards. However, he found this dissatisfying as once the short film ran it would stop and cease to play elsewhere. While working on the show Black-ish, series creator Kenya Barris inspired him to create an app that specialized in getting short films notoriety. The app dubbed Everybody Digital launched on October 3, 2017, and has been described as "the Netflix of short films."

Maldonado joined the cast of the 2018 remake of the 1972 film Super Fly. He appears in the TBS series The Last O.G. as Cousin Bobby, a character that develops along with Tracy Morgan's lead character Tray.

== Filmography ==
=== Acting credits ===
Film roles
Year	Title	Role	Notes
2002	Friday After Next	Juvenile #3	
2004	A Beautiful Life	Porfilio	Short film
2004	East L.A. King	Esclavo	Direct-to-Video
2005	America 101	Train Station Agent	
2005	States of Grace	Rob	
2007	4 Life	Chauncey	Direct-to-Video
2007	Live Free or Die Hard	Goatee	
2008	A Good Day to Be Black and Sexy	Jabari	Segment: "Tonight"
2008	Ball Don't Lie	Sin	
2008	The Midnight Meat Train	Lead Gangbanger	
2008	Rome & Jewel	Mercury	
2009	Underground Street Flippers	Extravagent	Short film
2009	Lost Angels	Bishop	
2009	The Grind	Eddie the Tweeker	
2009	The Ugly Truth	Duane	
2009	The Bee	Jamal Baker VII	
2010	The Power of Liquor	Andre	Short film
2010	In 30 Minutes	Paul	Short film
2011	Mimesis	Duane	
2011	Assumption	Derrick	Short film
2012	One Decision Away	Gerald	Short film
2012	Just One Look	Darryl	Short film
2012	An Awakening	Jake	Short film
2013	Who the F*ck Is Uncle Joe?	Tim	Short film
2013	The Violin	Jerry Shivers	Short film
2014	All Hail the King	Fletcher Heggs	Short film
2014	Cut!	Francis 'Jamal' Jefferson	
2014	The Equalizer	Marcus	
2014	Cake	Buddy	
2014	108 Stitches	Maurice 'Mo' Jamal	
2015	Dope	Allen the Bouncer	
2015	Forgiveness	PJ	
2015	Straight Outta Compton	Tone	
2015	If Not for His Grace	Dog	
2016	Unstuck	Jacob	Short film
2016	King Me	Will Lowery	Short film
2017	South Dakota	Gang Leader	
2017	Smartass	Antwan	
2017	Quest: The Truth Always Rises	Chris	
2017	Where's the Money	Juice	
2017	Miss Me This Christmas	Ulysses Danbert	
2017	Trump's America	Will Lowery	Short film
2017	Officer Lincoln Holly	Ofc: Manny Juarez	Short film
2018	NBA	Fantasy League Player	Short film
2018	First Match	Juan	
2018	Superfly	Litty	
2020	Project Power	Landry	
2022	American Carnage	Big Mac	
2023	House Party	Kyle	

Television roles
Year	Title	Role	Notes
2004	The Young and the Restless	Jamal	17 episodes
2005	Las Vegas	Jamal	Episode: "One Nation, Under Surveillance"
2005	Judging Amy	Diesel	2 episodes
2005	The Shield	Flash	Episode: "Bang"
2006	The Shield	Evan Dayne	2 episodes
2006	In Justice	Donald Brooks	Episode: "Another Country"
2006	Standoff	M.J. Martinez	Episode: "Life Support"
2007	Celebrity Deathmatch	Lil Wayne (voice)	Episode: "King of the Lil' People"
2009	Lie to Me	Caden	Episode: "The Better Half"
2010	Rizzoli & Isles	Cruncha	Episode: "Sympathy for the Devil"
2010	Detroit 1-8-7	Paul Osborne	Episode: "Home Invasion/Drive-By"
2011	Chase	Lawrence Lucky Vargas	Episode: "Roundup"
2013	The Start Up	Manny	TV pilot
2014–2016	You're the Worst	Honeynutz	Recurring; 13 episodes
2014–2019	Black Jesus	Young L.I.L.	2 episodes
2015	Bones	Keith Miller	Episode: "The Teacher in the Books"
2015	Ana Mead	Rocko The God	Episode #1.4
2015	Survivor's Remorse	DeShauwn May	2 episodes
2015–2019	Black-ish	Curtis Miller Jr.	Recurring
2016	Kirby Buckets	Mr. Fister	Episode: "Weekend with Inga"
2016	Major Crimes	Jon Barnes	2 episodes
2016	Ringside	Spencer	TV movie
2016	Noches con Platanito	Himself	Episode: "Allen Maldonado/Diana Isabel Acevedo/Karen Carreño/Paloma Ruiz/Jose Luis Badalt/Los Rodriguez de Sinaloa"
2016	Blaze and the Monster Machines	Falcon 3 (voice)	Episode: "Falcon Quest"
2017	Rosewood	Victor 'Lil V' Rivera	Episode: "Mummies & Meltdowns"
2017	NCIS	Raymond Smith	Episode: "Burden of Proof"
2018–2020	The Last O.G.	Cousin Bobby/Clyde	Main cast
2019	Liza on Demand	Kyle	2 episodes
2019	Elena of Avalor	Rocco (voice)	Episode: "Changing of the Guard"
2020	Rise of the Teenage Mutant Ninja Turtles	Tim Dunkman (voice)	Episode: "Air Turtle/Pizza Puffs"
2020	Sneakerheads	Devin	6 episodes
2021	Maya and the Three	Rico (voice)	9 episodes
2021	Psych 3: This Is Gus	Alan Decker	Television film
2021–2023	The Wonder Years	Coach Long	15 episodes
2021–2023	Heels	Rooster Robbins	16 episodes
2024–2025	Tomb Raider: The Legend of Lara Croft	Zip (voice)	14 episodes

Video game roles
Year	Title	Role
2012	Prototype 2	Hispanic Gangster
2013	Grand Theft Auto V	The Local Population
2016	Mafia III	Additional Cinematics Cast

=== Filmmaking credits ===
Year	Title	Director	(Executive) Producer	Writer	Editor	Cinematographer	Extra
2009	Underground Street Flippers	Yes	Yes	Yes	Yes	Yes	Also composer
2010	The Power of Liquor	Yes	Yes	Yes	Yes	Yes	
2010	In 30 Minutes	Yes	Yes	Yes	Yes	Yes	Also sound editor
2011	Assumption	Yes	Yes	No	Yes	No	
2012	One Decision Away	Yes	Yes	Yes	Yes	No	Also sound editor
2013	Who the F*ck Is Uncle Joe?	Yes	Yes	Yes	Yes	No	
2016–2017	Survivor's Remorse	No	No	Yes	No	No	Story editor and writer; 20 episodes
2017	400 to Oahu..	No	No	No	No	No	'Special Thanks'
2018	A Father's Love	No	Yes	Yes	No	No	
2019	The Last O.G.	No	No	Yes	No	No	Executive story editor and writer; 10 episodes
