= How I Married My High School Crush =

- Written by: Nancey Silvers; Ron Fassler
- Directed by: David Winkler
- Starring: Katee Sackhoff; Sage Brocklebank; Kim Poirier
- Country of origin: Canada
- Original language: English

Production
- Producer: Stephen Onda
- Running time: 90 minutes

Original release
- Network: Lifetime Movie Network
- Release: 1 July 2007

How I Married My High School Crush is a romantic telemovie broadcast by LMN. Aired on July 1, 2007, it stars Katee Sackhoff and Kim Poirier. Its working titles included Be Careful What You Wish For and Once Upon a Dream.

== Plot ==
Sara has been madly in love with popular classmate Brian ever since preschool and dreams of marrying him. He is unaware of her existence. A solar eclipse inexplicably transports them from high school in 1990 to the day of their wedding in 2007. Sara in reality is a 17-year-old, seen by those around her as thirty-something (along with Brian). Her dream marriage has come true, but she and Brian are not prepared for adulthood. Sara is in an election campaign for Lieutenant Governor and Brian is a wealthy investment banker. Brian is responsible for fraud at his investment company, and discovers that he is having an affair with his secretary. Sara finds out that she has become cruel and unreasonable in her quest for her dreams and has lost touch with her family and best friend Kate.

Sara decides that the only way to fix what has happened is to go back in time. She enlists the help of Kate's daughter to help her find out how to get back to 1990. Sara discovers that to travel back in time, she must be in the same place and time that the eclipse happened in 1990. But when Brian gets arrested for fraud and tax evasion, Sara must come to his rescue as his lawyer. During the trial, Sara and Brian find out that Brian's ex-girlfriend is the judge of his trial, they plead not guilty, and the bail is set at $100,000. In the end, they go back in time and forgot that they were married.

== Cast ==
- Katee Sackhoff as Sara Jacob
- Sage Brocklebank as Brian Porterson
- Kim Poirier as Kate Duncan
- Tommy Lioutas as Daniel Bock
- Nikki Elek as Michelle Duncan
- Anita Smith as Charlotte
- Stephen Huszar as older Tim
- Jaden Ryan as younger Tim
- Robin Clark as Principal Ruff
