= Desmond Askew =

English actor

- Born: 17 December 1972 (age 53); London, England
- Occupation: Actor

Desmond Askew (born 17 December 1972) is an English actor of film and television. In 1983 he had the lead role of 'naughty schoolboy' in the promo video of the Wham! single "Bad Boys". He has appeared in the films Go (1999), Repli-Kate (2002), The Hills Have Eyes (2006) and Turistas (2006).

He has appeared in episodic television on series such as Grange Hill from 1991 to 1994 portraying Richard Hare, Las Vegas, Charmed, the short-lived Then Came You, as the recurring character Brody Davis on Roswell, and the titular adaptation of the 1987 children's series Simon and the Witch. He also voiced many minor characters (including Jowan and Chanter Devons) in the 2009 video game Dragon Age Origins. He has recently voiced as CIA Nerd in Call of Duty: Black Ops II.

Askew studied at the Sylvia Young Theatre School. He stars in the 2009 comedy Winston: An Informal Guide to Etiquette.
