= Repli-Kate =

2002 film directed by Frank Longo

- Film poster
- Directed by: Frank Longo
- Written by: Stuart Gibbs; Russ Ryan
- Produced by: Warren Zide; Craig Perry; Ash R. Shah
- Starring: Ali Landry; James Roday; Desmond Askew; Eugene Levy
- Cinematography: Alan Caso
- Edited by: Janice Hampton; Jimmy Hill
- Music by: Teddy Castellucci
- Distributed by: 20th Century Fox
- Release date: August 6, 2002
- Running time: 95 minutes
- Country: United States
- Language: English

Repli-Kate is a 2002 American sex comedy film from National Lampoon, directed by Frank Longo and starring Ali Landry, James Roday Rodriguez, Desmond Askew and Eugene Levy.

== Plot ==
Max Fleming is a graduate student who has developed a powerful cloning machine for the egotistical Dr. Jonas. Jonas steals all the credit and leaves Max to toil in obscurity. One day, Max meets Kate Carson, a young and beautiful magazine reporter preparing a story on the cloning research at the university. During the interview, Kate accidentally cuts herself, and a few drops of her blood mingle with one of the cloning samples. Later that night, Max runs a test of the machine, and to his surprise he ends up with a replicant of Kate, which he names Repli-Kate.

Repli-Kate is fully adult (being exactly the same age the original Kate is), but she has no knowledge. Max and his roommate Henry thus set out to educate her, but with a male perspective. They want to turn her into the perfect woman: the beer-drinking, sport-loving, sexually aggressive girl of their dreams. She also becomes Max's girlfriend as result. However, when Max contemplates the resulting woman, he realizes that the girl of his dreams was Kate all along, not Repli-Kate.

Meanwhile, Dr. Jonas learns of the existence of Repli-Kate. He captures both her and the original Kate. He then decides to present the results of the human cloning in front of scientists from all over the world, with the aim of advertising "his" cloning machine. Max and Henry learn of Jonas's plan, and they formulate a rescue mission. Using a newly created Repli-Jonas, the pair are able to create enough confusion to save Kate and Repli-Kate.

Jonas and Repli-Jonas are sent to a cloning research lab as test subjects. Max inherits the university's cloning lab, and his cloning chamber brings him great fame and money. Max and Kate fall in love, as do Henry and Repli-Kate. Repli-Jonas manages to escape, and when Felix asks Max about what to do, he replies that Repli-Jonas is too dumb to go anywhere. The last image is Repli-Jonas, who is the new president. His discourse is just the word 'penis'.

== Cast ==
- Ali Landry as Kate Carson/Repli-Kate
- James Roday Rodriguez as Max Fleming
- Desmond Askew as Henry
- Eugene Levy as Professor Jonas Fromer/Repli-Jonas
- Kurt Fuller as President Chumley
