= Psych 2: Lassie Come Home =

2020 television film directed by Steve Franks

- Poster
- Genre: Detective fiction Comedy drama
- Based on: Psych by Steve Franks
- Written by: Steve Franks; James Roday Rodriguez; Andy Berman
- Directed by: Steve Franks
- Starring: James Roday Rodriguez; Dulé Hill; Timothy Omundson; Maggie Lawson; Kirsten Nelson; Corbin Bernsen
- Theme music composer: Steve Franks
- Country of origin: United States
- Original language: English

Production
- Executive producers: James Roday Rodriguez; Dulé Hill; Steve Franks; Chris Henze; Kelly Kulchak
- Producer: Chris Cheramie
- Running time: 88 minutes
- Production companies: Pacific Mountain Productions; Thruline Entertainment; Universal Content Productions

Original release
- Network: Peacock
- Release: July 15, 2020

Psych 2: Lassie Come Home is a 2020 American mystery-comedy film. The film is a stand-alone sequel to the first film from 2017 and the second installment of the Psych film series, based on and serving as a continuation of the USA Network dramedy series of the same name. The movie was released on July 15, 2020, on Peacock. James Roday Rodriguez, Dulé Hill, Timothy Omundson, Maggie Lawson, Kirsten Nelson, and Corbin Bernsen all reprised their roles from the series and first film, with frequently recurring actors Kurt Fuller and Jimmi Simpson also appearing. The film was directed by series creator Steve Franks, who co-wrote the script with Roday Rodriguez and Andy Berman.

== Plot ==
Chief Carlton Lassiter of the Santa Barbara Police Department is ambushed on the job and left for dead. After suffering a stroke on the operating table, Lassiter starts seeing unusual and possibly supernatural occurrences in his recovery facility. He also has occasional hallucinations about his dad, who had abandoned him as a child, and has many conversations with him.

Unable to remember and concerned that his condition makes him an unreliable witness of what he saw before getting shot, he reaches out to Shawn and Gus. The pair travel to Santa Barbara from San Francisco to assist Lassiter in his efforts to find his shooter and explain what he has been seeing. However, they are told that hallucinations are side-effects of the medicine by Dolores, Lassiter's nurse during his recovery, and who is crushing on Gus. What they do not realize is that Juliet O'Hara, Lassiter's former partner at the SBPD and Shawn's wife, is also investigating. Chief Vick is attempting to become commissioner and is forced to shut down Juliet's investigation.

Morrissey, Lassiter's dog (a gift from Shawn), returns with a human hand which Shawn and Gus send to Woody the coroner. Juliet discovers a missing bullet, and sends it - against orders - to be analyzed. Juliet realizes that Shawn is in Santa Barbara, and they attempt to hide their involvement in the case from each other. Woody's results reveal the hand belongs to a CEO named Devon Tileback, who committed suicide. Lassiter witnesses a bleeding man seek shelter in a building across from his own, but it is mixed up with other hallucinations, causing everyone to dismiss his claims. Shawn and Gus investigate but find only medical supplies and ice chips before being forced to leave by Dr Emile Herschel, the head of the facility. Selene, Gus's girlfriend, mistakenly believes that Gus is involved with Dolores after Juliet lets it slip that the two have secretly gone back to Santa Barbara. The two start their own investigation together. Chief Vick discovers this but covers it up while preparing for her interviews.

Shawn and Gus investigate Viking's Bar, a place frequented by Tileback and owned by Ova Asblorn. After being chased out by Ova's son Per, they crash into a hideout where the supposedly dead Tileback has been hiding after faking his death. Tileback is killed by a sniper before he can say anything. Buzz McNab, now an SBPD detective, investigates. Juliet and Selene arrive, and, while hiding from them, Shawn finds a positive pregnancy test in Juliet's car. Meanwhile, Lassiter claims to have seen Wilkerson, a fellow patient at the facility, walking. After taking some advice from Henry (Shawn's father and a former police detective himself), Shawn, and Gus decide to believe Lassiter and attempt to prove that the Wilkerson is faking a coma. Gus and Shawn try to tickle him but fail and are kicked out. Woody pretends to be an eccentric doctor named Catalon for them.

Seconds before her commissioner interview, Vick receives an envelope with some urgent reports. During the interview, she peeks into the report and realizes that the bullet that Juliet found matches the one that hit Lassiter. Vick leaves midway through the interview.

Woody, Shawn, and Gus find bloodied clothes hidden among the medical supplies and realize Lassiter was right when he said he had seen someone seek shelter that night. They believe someone from the hospital, possibly Dr. Herschel, was involved. They, alongside Henry, attempt to convince Dolores that Herschel is guilty.

After Shawn and Gus both have vivid hallucinations about Mary Lightly, they realize that the ice chips are spiked and come across an awake Wilkerson. He tells them that he was Tileback's silent partner and is faking catatonia to save himself from the suspect, who is working as the insider in the facility. He reveals that they were cooking the books in their company.

While Wilkerson was in the hospital recovering and under the influence of pain medication, he spilled the secret to someone. The insider used this information to blackmail Tileback, and shot Lassiter when Tileback tried to meet him, and eventually shot Tileback. Woody informs them that the bloodied clothes they found contain a pair of earmuffs which they realize are from Viking's Bar.

The Gus, Shawn, and Woody go back to the bar where they find Selene, Juliet, and Vick following a lead on the bullet. Shawn remembers that Ova had a surgery mark and deduces that he was also once a patient at the facility. He suspects him to be involved, but they discover that Per has murdered his father. Shawn then realizes that Ova was not the one who was involved and that he had also, under the influence of drugs, revealed to the insider that he was a former criminal. This fact led the suspect to approach his son Per, who was angry at Ova for turning a new leaf. He teamed up with the suspect and became the muscle of the operation. He confesses to shooting Lassiter. Selene reveals she is the one who is pregnant, proposes to Gus, and punches the shooter.

Meanwhile, Dolores, revealed to be the insider and the mastermind behind the plan, spikes Lassiter's pint with poison in an attempt to kill him. However, Lassiter is encouraged by hallucinations of his father to fight back and not give up as his family needs him. Lassiter, reassured that he will be able to walk again, blows up the pint and subdues the nurse.

After the killers are caught, the team celebrates. Selene reveals to Gus that they have one little problem that needs to be solved: she is still married. Henry and Juliet convince Lassiter to finally meet with his wife Marlowe, whom he had not seen since his stroke because he was embarrassed by his condition and hadn't wanted her to see him. Marlowe finally appears, and he manages to take a few steps towards her as they reunite.

== Cast ==
- James Roday Rodriguez as Shawn Spencer
- Dulé Hill as Burton "Gus" Guster
- Timothy Omundson as Carlton Lassiter
- Maggie Lawson as Juliet "Jules" O'Hara Spencer
- Kirsten Nelson as Chief Karen Vick
- Corbin Bernsen as Henry Spencer
- Joel McHale as Lassiter's father
- Kurt Fuller as Woody Strode
- Jazmyn Simon as Selene
- Jimmi Simpson as Mary Lightly
- Sarah Chalke as Nurse Dolores
- Allison Miller as Maisie
- Kadeem Hardison as Wilkerson
- Christopher Heyerdahl as Ova
- Richard Schiff as Dr. Emile Herschel
- Sage Brocklebank as Buzz McNab
- Kristy Swanson as Marlowe Lassiter

== Production ==
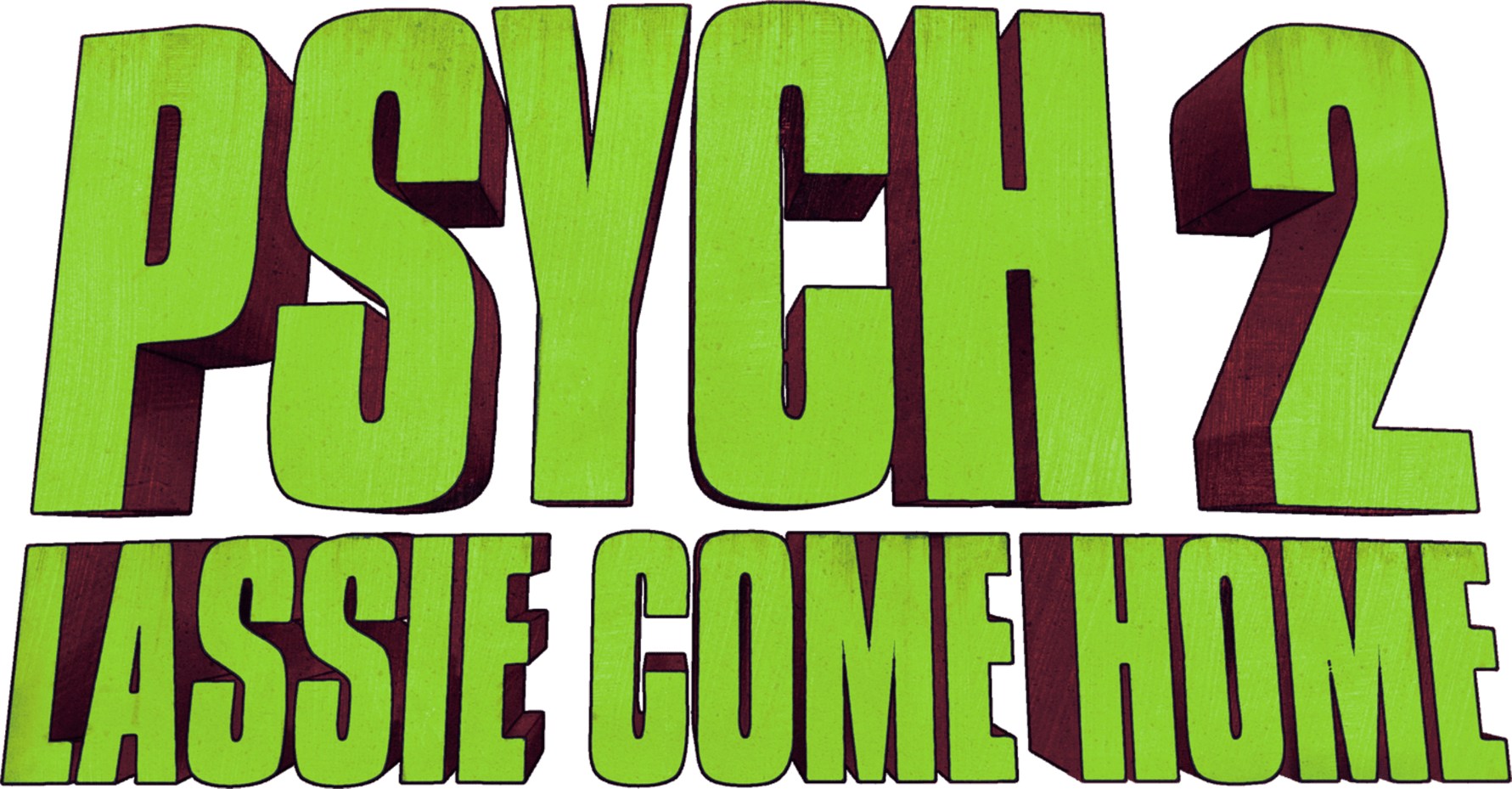
Movie's logo

After Psych: The Movie, Franks indicated he wanted to make five more Psych movies. On February 14, 2019, it was announced Psych: The Movie 2 was greenlit and all the main cast would return for the TV movie, which was set to premiere in late 2019. On April 18, 2019, it was announced Joel McHale would be joining the TV movie, as well as Jimmi Simpson, reprising his recurring role as Mary Lightly. On September 17, 2019, it was announced that the sequel had been renamed Psych 2: Lassie Come Home and would instead be airing on NBC Universal's new streaming service, Peacock.

Psych 2: Lassie Come Home was the first movie Timothy Omundson shot on set since having a stroke in 2017. The script was written to incorporate elements of Omundson's condition post-stroke to fit into the show. Joel Mchale's casting was kept a secret from his friend Omundson in order to surprise him on their first day on set together.

== Reception ==
The film holds an 85% approval rating on Rotten Tomatoes, based on 13 reviews with an average rating of 8.2/10. The site's critical consensus reads, "Satisfyingly self-contained while refreshingly opening up new directions for the Psych team, Lassie Come Home delivers the crowd-pleasing goods with the skill of a mind reader." TV Guide graded the film five out of five stars.

== Sequel ==
On May 13, 2021, Peacock announced a third movie, Psych 3: This Is Gus, which premiered November 18, 2021 on the streaming service Peacock.
