= Kurt Fuller =

American actor (born 1953)

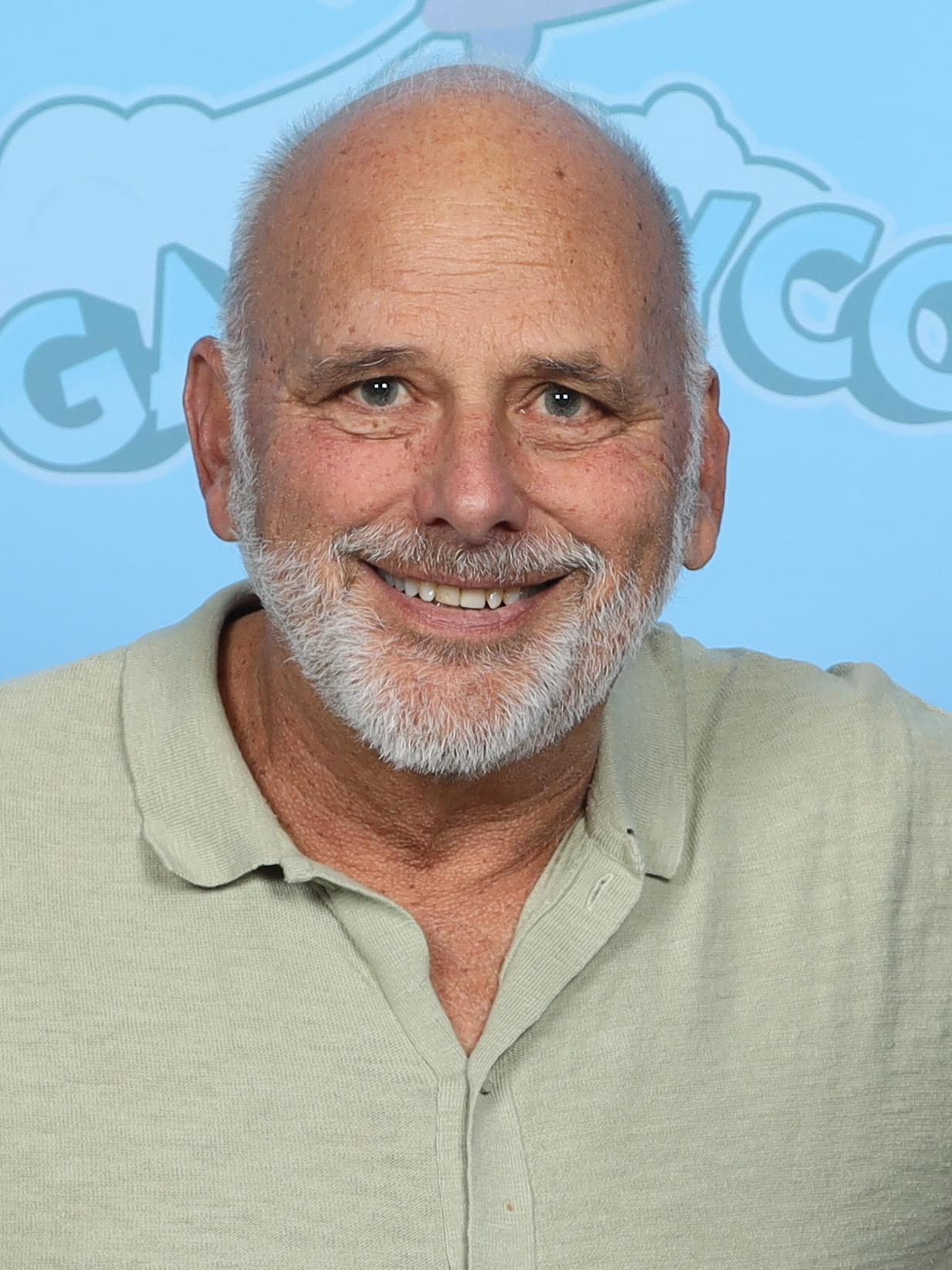
- Fuller at GalaxyCon Columbus in 2024
- Born: September 16, 1953 (age 73); San Francisco, California, U.S.
- Occupation: Actor
- Years active: 1984–present
- Spouse: Jessica Hendra (m. 1993)
- Children: 2

Kurt Fuller (born September 16, 1953) is an American character actor. He has appeared in a number of television, film, and stage projects. He is known for his roles in the films No Holds Barred and Ghostbusters II (both 1989), Wayne's World (1992), and Scary Movie (2000), as well as for his television roles playing Coroner Woody Strode in the USA Network television series Psych (2009–2014) and Zachariah in Supernatural (2009–2019).

== Early life ==
Fuller was born in San Francisco, California, and raised in Stockton.

== Career ==
Fuller has played television director Russell in Wayne's World; a mayoral aide in Ghostbusters II; the television executive and mastermind of the "Battle of the Tough Guys", Mr. Brell, in No Holds Barred; a real estate agent in Elvira: Mistress of the Dark; and NSC Director Robert Lindsey in the third season of Alias. Fuller has also played real-life figures Werner Klemperer (in Paul Schrader's Auto Focus) and Karl Rove (on the TV satire That's My Bush!). He also portrayed Pacific Bell Retirement Fund Executive Walter Ribbon in The Pursuit of Happyness.

Fuller has also appeared in many television shows, including Knight Rider, Timecop, Quantum Leap, L.A. Law, Murder, She Wrote, Ally McBeal, Felicity, Malcolm in the Middle, The West Wing, Boston Legal, Boston Public, House, Monk, Desperate Housewives, the live-action version of The Tick, Charmed, Carnivàle, My Name Is Earl, Ugly Betty, Glee, Drop Dead Diva and the pilot episode of NewsRadio. He has had a recurring role as Woody the Coroner on Psych and another on Supernatural, portraying a malevolent angel called Zachariah. Fuller later reprised the role for Supernatural's 300th episode "Lebanon." He also acted as a Senior Police Officer in the 2000 comedy Scary Movie, who is the commanding officer of Doofy.

In 1986, he played Frank in the US premiere of Steven Berkoff's play Kvetch in West Los Angeles. The following year he reprised the role Off-Broadway at the Westside Arts Theater. From 2010 to 2011, Fuller appeared in the ABC Network series Better with You, but the show was canceled after a single season.

Fuller portrayed director of the C.I.A., Grayden Osborne, in the ABC drama Scandal. He has also appeared in Fox's Us & Them with Jane Kaczmarek and Jason Ritter.

== Personal life ==
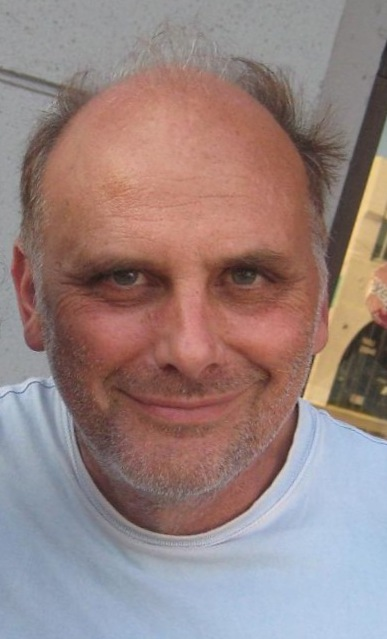
Fuller in 2008

He is married to actress and author Jessica Hendra (daughter of actor and writer Tony Hendra) and has two daughters, Julia and Charlotte. Fuller is Jewish. He is a registered Democrat.

== Filmography ==
=== Film ===
Year	Title	Role	Notes
1987	The Running Man	Tony	
1988	Miracle Mile	Gerstead	
1988	Elvira, Mistress of the Dark	Mr. Glotter	
1988	Red Heat	Detective	
1989	True Believer	George Ballistics	
1989	No Holds Barred	Brell	
1989	Ghostbusters II	Jack Hardemeyer	
1989	Under the Boardwalk	Tortoise	
1990	The Bonfire of the Vanities	Pollard Browning	
1991	Eve of Destruction	Bill Schneider	
1991	Bingo	Lennie	
1992	Wayne's World	Russell Finley	
1992	Original Intent	Alex Grabowsky	
1993	Calendar Girl	Arturo Gallo	
1994	Reflections on a Crime	Howard	
1995	Stuart Saves His Family	Von Arks	
1995	French Exit	Stubin	
1995	Just Looking	Chuck	
1996	Twisted Desire	Detective Becker	
1996	The Fan	Bernie	
1996	Independence Day	Dr. Libby Fields	News Footage
1997	Looking for Lola	Dr. Gregory Hinson	
1997	Moonbase	Deckert	
1999	Diamonds	Moses Agency	
1999	Red Dog Squadron	Kaiser Wilhelm	
1999	Pushing Tin	Ed Clabes	
2000	Scary Movie	Sheriff Burke	
2002	Joshua	Father Pat Hayes	
2002	The New Guy	Mr. Undine	
2002	Auto Focus	Werner Klemperer	
2002	Repli-Kate	President Chumley	
2003	Anger Management	Frank Head	
2004	Ray	Sam Clark	
2005	Don't Come Knocking	Mr. Daily	
2005	The Civilization of Maxwell Bright	Berdette	
2006	The Pursuit of Happyness	Walter Ribbon	
2006	Good Cop, Bad Cop	Kramer	
2007	Mr. Woodcock	Councilman Luke	
2008	Superhero Movie	Mr. Thompson	
2008	Private Valentine: Blonde & Dangerous	Cousin Barry	
2009	National Lampoon's Van Wilder: Freshman Year	Dean Reardon	
2010	Group Sex	Bloom	
2010	The Prankster	Dean Pecarino	
2011	Midnight in Paris	John	
2012	The Silent Thief	Howard Henderson	
2012	Love and Germophobia	Dr. Robinson	Short film
2013	The Frozen Ground	D.A. Pat Clives	
2013	Wrong Cops	Music producer	
2014	The Wolves of Savin Hill	Carl	
2015	Accidental Love	Reverend Norm	
2015	A Light Beneath Their Feet	Dr. Rutter	
2018	Josie	Gordie	
2018	Baja	Hal Johnson	
2018	Office Uprising	Lentworth	
2019	Phil	Dean Wurtz	
2023	Sound of Freedom	Frost	

=== Television ===
Year	Title	Role	Notes
1984	Knight Rider	Cameraman	Episode: "Speed Demons"
1985	Wildside	Elliot Thogmorton	6 episodes
1986–1994	L.A. Law	Ed Freeling / Stan Nussbaum / Clifford Gild	3 episodes
1987	Warm Hearts, Cold Feet	Roger	Television film
1987	Cagney & Lacey	Lorca	Episode: "Waste Deep"
1987	The Tortellis	Charo's Manager	Episode: "Coochie, Coochie"
1987	Hooperman	Eliot, the Nephew	Episode: "John Doe, We Hardly Knew Ye"
1987	Sledge Hammer!	FBI Agent Bunion	Episode: "Hammer Hits the Rock"
1987	Beverly Hills Buntz	Harry	Episode: "Fit to Be Tied"
1987–1988	Jake and the Fatman	Mr. Burnstein	2 episodes
1988	It's Garry Shandling's Show	Adam's Dad	Episode: "The Soccer Show"
1988	Newhart	Bill Dryden	Episode: "Would You Buy a Used Car from This Handyman?"
1988	The Van Dyke Show	Steve	Episode: "Dick Stops Smoking"
1988	227	Bosworth Duncan	Episode: "A Yen for Lester"
1989	CBS Schoolbreak Special	Peter Webster	Episode: "Frog Girl: The Jenifer Graham Story"
1989	Glory Days	Walter Ayoob	Episode: "Whattya Wanna Do Tonight?"
1990	Capital News	Miles Plato	13 episodes
1990	Hurricane Sam	Mr. Gower	Television film
1991	Shannon's Deal	Garth	Episode: "Greed"
1991	Stat	Mickey Weller	Episode: "Psychosomatic"
1991	Quantum Leap	Lloyd Eastland	Episode: "Nuclear Family - October 26, 1962"
1991	Marilyn and Me	Harry Lipton	Television film
1992	Laurie Hill	Dr. Spencer Kramer	10 episodes
1992	Civil Wars	Jonathan Bentel	Episode: "Dirty Pool"
1992	The Heart of Justice	Dr. Leonard	Television film
1993	Relentless: Mind of a Killer	Dahlberg	Television film
1993	Harmful Intent	Bingham	Television film
1994	Ellen	Dr. Collins	Episode: "The Refrigerator"
1994	Diagnosis: Murder	Dr. Albert Blank / Walter Litvak	3 episodes
1995	NewsRadio	Ed Harlow	Episode: "Pilot"
1995	Virus	Dr. Williams	Television film
1995	Vanishing Son	Isaac	2 episodes
1995	See Jane Run	Dr. Melloff	Television film
1995	Live Shot	Mitch Merman	Episode: "The Forgotten Episode"
1995	Murder, She Wrote	Sheriff Milo Pike	Episode: "A Quaking in Aspen"
1995	Aaahh!!! Real Monsters	Vincent Van Strough (voice)	Episode: "History of the Monster World: Part One / Fear, Thy Name Is Ickis"
1996	The Faculty	Everette Sloan	Episode: "Pilot"
1996	Suddenly Susan	Bill Keane	Episode: "First Episode"
1996	Twisted Desire	Det. Becker	Television film
1996	Doomsday Virus	Chet Walter	2 episodes
1997	Love's Deadly Triangle: The Texas Cadet Murder	Detective Tom Green	Television film
1997	Crisis Center	Unknown character	Episode: "He Said, She Said"
1997–1998	Timecop	Dr. Dale Easter	9 episodes
1998	Brooklyn South	Gerald Nader	Episode: "Violet Inviolate"
1998	Dharma & Greg	David Saunders	Episode: "The House That Dharma Built"
1998	Principal Takes a Holiday	Principal Frank Hockenberry	Television film
1998–1999	Chicago Hope	Artie Lomax	2 episodes
1999	The Practice	Mr. Lawrence	Episode: "Target Practice"
1999	The Jack Bull	Conrad	Television film
1999	Family Law	Mr. Cutler	Episode: "The Fourth Trimester"
1999–2001	Providence	Thrifty Ticket Agent / Michael	2 episodes
1999–2002	Ally McBeal	Attorney Paget / Bernard Marsh	2 episodes
2000	The Beach Boys: An American Family	Milton Love/Mike Love's Dad	2 episodes
2000	Angels in the Infield	Simon	Television film
2001	Malcolm in the Middle	Mr. Young	Episode: "Hal Quits"
2001	That's My Bush!	Karl Rove	8 episodes
2002	The Tick	Destroyo	Episode: "The Tick vs. Justice"
2002	Boston Public	Ken Thomas	Episode: "Chapter Thirty-Five"
2002	Porn 'n Chicken	Dean Widehead	Television film
2002	The West Wing	SitRoom Civilian Advisor	2 episodes
2002	Felicity	Paul Korsikoff	Episode: "Back to the Future"
2002	Live from Baghdad	Inky	Television film
2003	The Guardian	Frank DeScala	Episode: "Understand Your Man"
2003	Judging Amy	Leonard Zook	Episode: "Maxine Interrupted"
2003	Oliver Beene	Mitch	Episode: "Home, a Loan"
2003	Monk	Dennis Gammill	Episode: "Mr. Monk and the Very, Very Old Man"
2003	Karen Sisco	Bo Sweeten	Episode: "Nostalgia"
2003	Alias	Robert Lindsey	6 episodes
2003	The Handler	Edward Burke	Episode: "Dirty White Collar"
2004	Las Vegas	Siegel	Episode: "Blood is Thicker"
2005	House	Mark Adams	Episode: "Poison"
2005	Unscripted	Kurt	2 episodes
2005	Charmed	John Norman	Episode: "Carpe Demon"
2005	Yes, Dear	Doctor	Episode: "Jimmy Has Changed"
2005	Boston Legal	Reverend Donald Diddum	3 episodes
2005	The 4400	Keane Driscoll	Episode: "Graduation Day"
2005–2006	Desperate Housewives	Detective Barton	5 episodes
2006	In Justice	Kenneth Long	Episode: "Confessions"
2006	Avatar: The Last Airbender	Quon (voice)	Episode: "Lake Laogai"
2006–2007	Big Day	Steve	12 episodes
2007	Eyes	Michael Zucker	Episode: "Whistleblower"
2007	Studio 60 on the Sunset Strip	Ted Atkins	Episode: "Monday"
2007	The Batman	Superior (voice)	Episode: "Artifacts"
2007	My Name Is Earl	Mr. Baldwyn	Episode: "G.E.D."
2007	CSI: Crime Scene Investigation	Sheriff Ned Bastille	Episode: "Ending Happy"
2007	Ugly Betty	Mr. Tanen	Episode: "How Betty Got Her Grieve Back"
2007	Shark	Ben Bentley	Episode: "For Whom the Skel Rolls"
2007	Grey's Anatomy	Jerry	Episode: "Physical Attraction... Chemical Reaction"
2008	Hollywood Residential	Chet	
2009	Eli Stone	Doug Stemple	Episode: "Tailspin"
2009	Glee	Mr. McClung	Episode: "Preggers"
2009	Legally Mad	Lou Peable	Unaired pilot
2009–2010, 2019	Supernatural	Zachariah	8 episodes
2009–2014	Psych	Coroner Woody Strode	33 episodes
2010	Men of a Certain Age	Scarpulla Manager	Episode: "Back in the Sh*t"
2010	Sons of Tucson	Principal	Episode: "Pilot"
2010	Drop Dead Diva	Henry Bingum	Episode: "Senti-Mental Journey"
2010	Svetlana	Interrogator	Episode: "Water-Board Certified"
2010–2011	Better with You	Joel Putney	22 episodes
2011–2016	The Good Wife	Judge Peter Dunaway	7 episodes
2012–2014	Parenthood	Dr. Bedsloe	5 episodes
2013	Scandal	Grayden Osborne	4 episodes
2013–2014	Us & Them	Michael	7 episodes
2014	Rebels	Arnie	Episode: "Pilot"
2014	Things You Shouldn't Say Past Midnight	Mr. Abramson	3 episodes
2014	The Crazy Ones	Mitchell Payson	Episode: "Dead and Improved"
2014	Jennifer Falls	Dr. Wessman	Episode: "Three Dates with My Mother"
2014	Franklin & Bash	Eckhart Smits	Episode: "Honor Thy Mother"
2014	Manhattan Love Story	William	11 episodes
2015	Hot in Cleveland	Gerald	Episode: "Duct Soup"
2015	Bones	Sid Lauren	Episode: "The Big Beef at the Royal Diner"
2015–2017	Rosewood	Floyd Butters	3 episodes
2016	BrainDead	J.K. Cornish	Episode: "The Power of Euphemism: How Torture Became a Matter of Debate in American Politics"
2017	Bull	Judge Robert Genda	Episode: "Name Game"
2017	Psych: The Movie	Coroner Woody Strode	Television film
2017	American Dad!	Stadium Manager (voice)	Episode: "The Long Bomb"
2018	Law & Order: Special Victims Unit	Jed Karey	3 episodes
2018	Shooter	Andrew Gold	3 episodes
2018	The Truth About the Harry Quebert Affair	Gareth Pratt	10 episodes
2018	Heathers	Principal Gowan	Recurring role
2018	Black-ish	Police Officer	Episode: "Christmas in Theater Eight"
2018–2019	The Good Fight	Judge Peter Dunaway	2 episodes
2019	Grand Hotel	Clive	Episode: "Groom Service"
2019–2024	Evil	Kurt Boggs	Series regular
2020	Psych 2: Lassie Come Home	Coroner Woody Strode	Television film
2021	Psych 3: This Is Gus	Coroner Woody Strode	Television film
2022	Grace and Frankie	Albert	Episode: "The Raccoon"
2022	Would I Lie to You?	Himself	Episode: "Allowance PowerPoint"
2023	Night Court	Jeff Dewitt	2 episodes
2026	Scrubs	Rick Fabian	Episode: "My Halloween"
2026	All's Fair	Winston Bloom	Episode: "Thanksgiving: Part 1"
2026	Elsbeth	Rory Torkelson	Episode: "A Bad Lie"

=== Video games ===
Year	Title	Role	Notes
2011	L.A. Noire	Richard Coombs	Voice
