= James Roday Rodriguez =

American actor (born 1976)

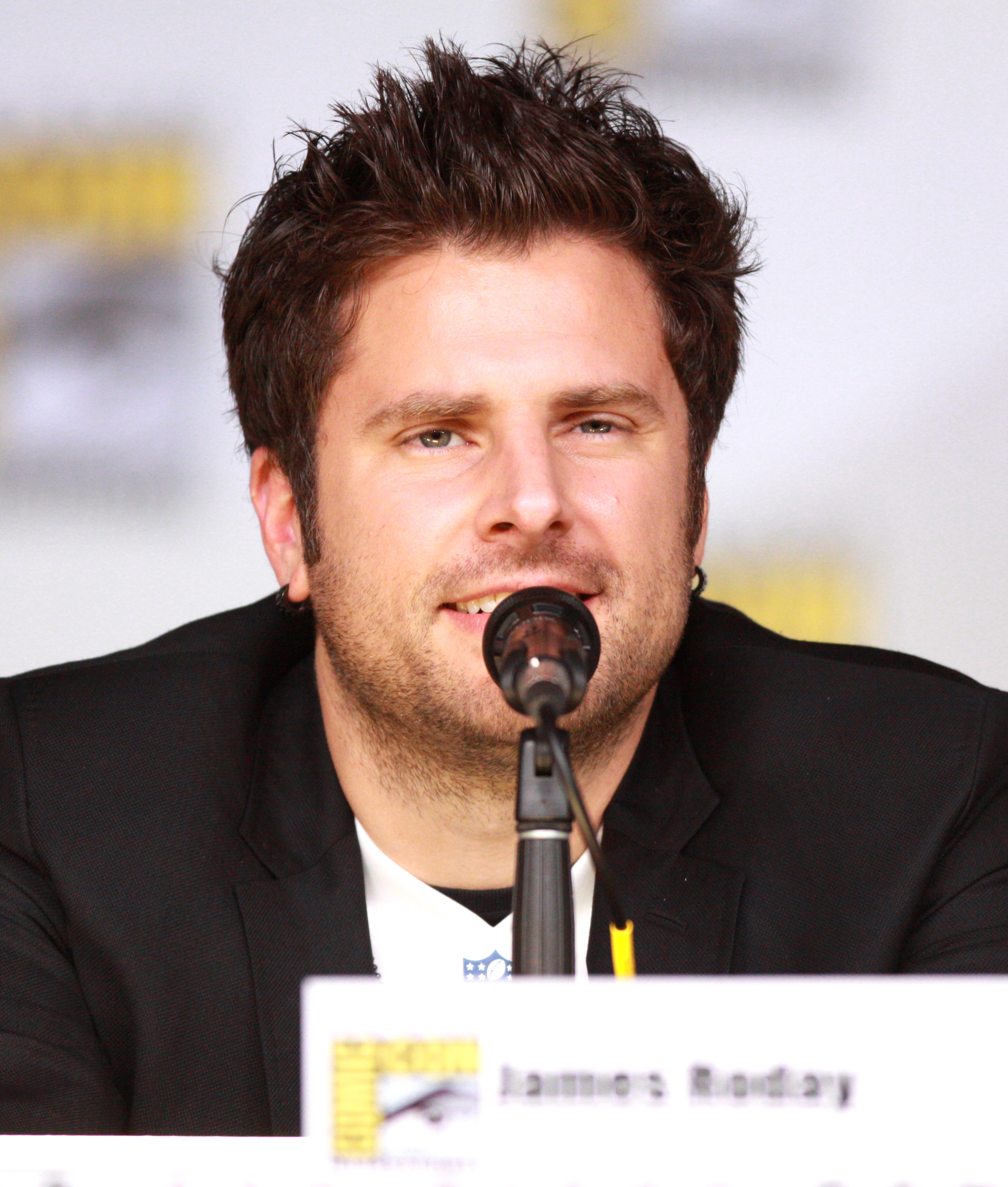
- Rodriguez at the 2013 San Diego Comic Con
- Born: James David Rodriguez; April 4, 1976 (age 50); San Antonio, Texas, U.S.
- Other names: James Roday (professional name; 1998–2020)
- Education: New York University (BFA)
- Occupations: Actor; director; screenwriter
- Years active: 1999–present
- Partner: Maggie Lawson (2006–2014)

James Roday Rodriguez (born James David Rodriguez, April 4, 1976), formerly known professionally as James Roday, is an American actor, director, and screenwriter. He is best known for portraying Shawn Spencer, a hyper-observant consultant detective and fake psychic, in USA Network series Psych and the subsequent Psych film series. He also starred in A Million Little Things (2018–2023) as Javier "Gary" Mendez.

== Early life ==
Rodriguez was born in San Antonio, Texas, as James David Rodriguez. His father, James "Jim" Rodriguez, a retired Air Force master sergeant, is of Mexican descent. His mother, Deborah Collins, has English, Irish, and Scottish ancestry.

He attended Taft High School in San Antonio and studied at NYU TISCH's Experimental Theatre Wing, earning a Bachelor of Fine Arts degree.

== Stage name ==
At the age of 22, Rodriguez selected the professional name James Roday. In a July 2020 interview, he explained the decision was mainly driven by producers and casting directors feeling his appearance clashed with his Latino family name. The characters he read for up until that point were not written with a Latino background in mind. In order to book his first job, he legally changed his middle name, David, to Roday (picked from an Anton Chekhov play he was starring in at the time), and omitted Rodriguez from his screen name. In the same interview, he stated regret that he "sold out [his] heritage in about 15 seconds." Rodriguez announced in that interview that going forward, he would use his full legal name of James Roday Rodriguez.

== Career ==
=== Theatre ===
Rodriguez first decided to make acting his full-time career in high school, where he was part of the theatre department run by James Buchanan, who would later become co-founder of the Communications Arts High School. Rodriguez cites Buchanan as "the architect behind [his] love for art and the belief [he] could make a run at making it for a living". While at Taft, he became a UIL State Champion, being named best actor for his performance in the play The Elephant Man.

On Buchanan's advice, Rodriguez went on to study at NYU, where he starred in various theatrical productions, including Three Sisters, A Respectable Wedding, and Severity's Mistress.

In 1999, Rodriguez co-produced a production of Henry V at the Mazer Theatre in New York City, starring Brad Raider whom he had attended NYU with. Afterward, the two friends founded Red Dog Squadron, a non-profit, Los Angeles-based theater company, both acting as co-artistic directors. With his company, Rodriguez produced several plays, the most recent of which was CAL IN CAMO in 2018. In addition to his producing capacity, he took on leading roles in Sexual Perversity in Chicago and Extinction (which had runs in both Los Angeles and off-Broadway in New York), wrote and directed the one-act play Sustenance, and directed the play Greedy.

In December 2016, Rodriguez starred in the New York production of White Rabbit Red Rabbit by Iranian playwright Nassim Soleimanpour.

Rodriguez is a member of the board of trustees at the Legacy Theatre in Branford, Connecticut, which was co-founded by Keely Baisden Knudsen, a fellow NYU graduate.

For the Legacy Theatre, Rodriguez produced the world premiere of Laurence Davis's play Masters of Puppets in 2023. In 2024, Rodriguez and Baisden Knudsen co-starred in a performance of A.R. Gurney's Love Letters. In 2025, Rodriguez led a sold-out run of “the funniest farce ever written,” Noises Off.

=== 1999–2005: Big screen and television beginnings ===
Rodriguez's big screen debut was in the 1999 film Coming Soon alongside Gaby Hoffmann, Bonnie Root, Ryan Reynolds and Ashton Kutcher.

Other early film credits include the 2003 film Rolling Kansas and the 2005 film adaptation of The Dukes of Hazzard.

Rodriguez's early television credits include starring roles in 2001's First Years and NBC's Miss Match in 2003.

Behind the scenes, he and high school friend/writing partner Todd Harthan wrote a sequel script to April Fools Day, which "gained momentum" but was never produced. Together with James DeMonaco, Rodriguez and Harthan went on to write the screenplay for the 2006 film Skinwalkers and also worked on an unused script for the film adaptation of the video game Driver.

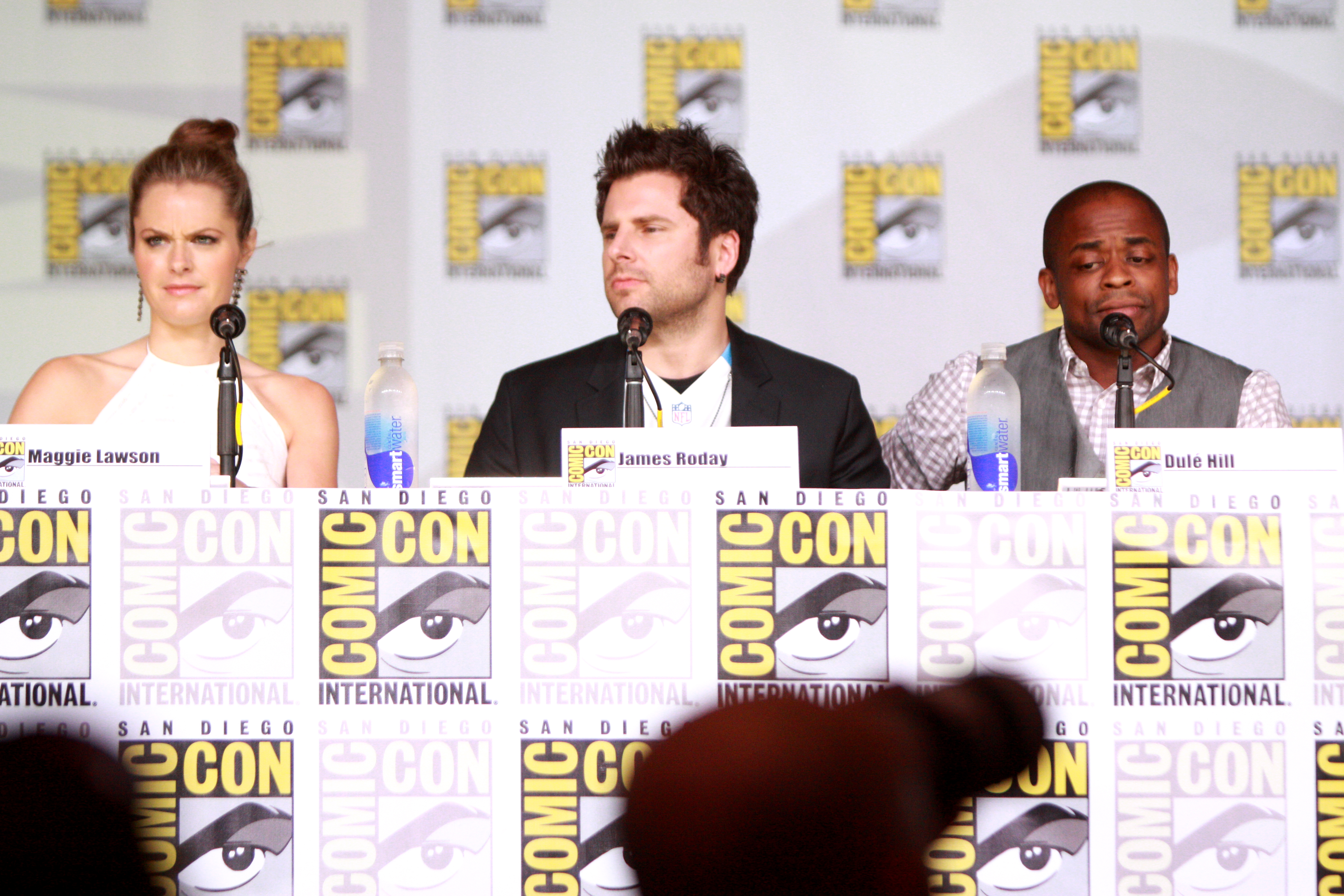
James Roday Rodriguez (middle) at a ComicCon panel in 2013 with Maggie Lawson (left) and Dulé Hill (right)

=== 2006–present: Psych franchise ===
Rodriguez's big break came on July 7, 2006, with the series premiere of USA Network's original series Psych. Airing following the season premiere of USA's other comedic success, Monk, it was the highest-rated scripted basic cable TV show premiere of 2006. Psych ran for eight seasons until 2014.

In 2017, Rodriguez returned to his most famous role in Psych: The Movie, which he also executive produced and co-wrote with Psych's series creator Steve Franks. It aired on USA Network in December 2017.

A sequel, Psych 2: Lassie Come Home, debuted July 15, 2020, on NBCUniversal's streaming service Peacock. It was the first project crediting him as James Roday Rodriguez. Psych 3: This Is Gus was released on Peacock on November 18, 2021. On both projects, he once again served as co-writer and executive producer.

As of May 2023, the script for a fourth Psych movie is done but has not been greenlit yet.

=== Post-Psych ===
After Psych the series ended, Rodriguez starred in various pilots and independent films, most notably Pushing Dead by independent filmmaker Tom E. Brown, which accumulated a number of awards at film festivals in the US and elsewhere.

In 2018, Rodriguez returned to network television, starring as Gary Mendez on ABC's dramedy A Million Little Things, which ran for 5 seasons. He co-wrote the series' final episode, "One Big Thing", with series creator DJ Nash.

Rodriguez branched out into voice acting in the 2021 animated feature Night of the Animated Dead, an adaptation of George A. Romero's Night of the Living Dead.

=== Focus on directing and writing ===
Since Psych, Rodriguez has spent more time behind the camera as a director, writer and producer. He directed episodes for Battle Creek, Rush Hour, Rosewood, Blood Drive, The Resident, The Crossover and High Potential. He also developed, wrote, and directed the pilots Shoot the Moon for USA and Quest for Truth for E!.

Rodriguez released his first feature directorial debut, Gravy, in 2015, co-written by him and Todd Harthan. He co-wrote (once again with Todd Harthan) and directed his second film Treehouse as part of Hulu's monthly horror movie anthology Into the Dark, which aired in March 2019.

In 2025, Rodriguez published his first short story titled "The Long Straw" in the fantasy and horror anthology magazine Weird Tales, issue #371.

Recently, Rodriguez directed and co-wrote Rule of Three with Harthan—the first movie in a planned trilogy, based on a novel The Rule of Three by Sam Ripley. Filming started in January 2026, with an as-of-yet unknown release date.

== Personal life ==
Rodriguez dated his Psych co-star Maggie Lawson throughout most of the series run. They broke up in 2013, before the final season aired.

== Filmography ==
Year	Title	Role	Notes
1999	Coming Soon	Chad	
1999	Ryan Caulfield: Year One	Vic	Series regular
2000	Believe	Bruce Arm / Agent Johnny	Short
2000	Get Real	Trent Sykes	
2001	First Years	Edgar	Series regular
2002	Driver	—N/a	Unused first draft, co-written with James DeMonaco and Todd Harthan
2002	Repli-Kate	Max	Lead role
2002	Providence	Alexander Conrad	
2002	Showtime	'Maxis' Cameraman	
2002	Rolling Kansas	Dick Murphy	
2003	Miss Match	Nick Paine	Series regular
2005	Don't Come Knocking	Mickey, First Assistant Director	
2005	The Dukes of Hazzard	Billy Prickett	
2006	Skinwalkers	—N/a	Co-writer with James DeMonaco and Todd Harthan
2006	Beerfest	German Messenger	
2006–14	Psych	Shawn Spencer	Also writer of 16 episodes, director of 8 episodes, and producer
2008	Fear Itself	Carlos	Episode: "In Sickness and in Health"
2009	Gamer	News Co-Host #1	
2009	His Name Was Jason: 30 Years of Friday the 13th	Himself	Documentary
2011	WWE Tough Enough	Himself	Episode: "I've Been Bamboozled & Flabbergasted"
2011	Love Bites	Jeff	Episode: "TMI"
2012	WWE Raw Super Show	Himself	Special guest ring announcer
2013	Mr. Payback	Malikai	Short
2014	Shoot the Moon	—N/a	Director, writer and executive producer; unaired pilot
2015	Battle Creek	—N/a	Director of 1 episode
2015	Gravy	Marty	Also director and co-writer with Todd Harthan
2015	Good Session	Joel	Lead role, unaired pilot
2015	Christmas Eve	B	a.k.a. Stuck
2015	Baby Baby Baby	J.B.	
2015	The Nerd Herd	Kip Mitchell	Lead role, unaried pilot
2015–16	Rosewood	—N/a	Director of 5 episodes
2016	Quest For Trtuh	—N/a	Director and co-writer with Ben McMillan; unaired pilot
2016	Rush Hour	—N/a	Director of 1 episode
2016	Pushing Dead	Dan Schauble	Lead role
2017	Blood Drive	—N/a	Director of 2 episodes
2017	Psych: The Movie	Shawn Spencer	TV film, also co-writer with Steve Franks and executive producer
2018–23	A Million Little Things	Gary Mendez	Series regular; also co-writer of series finale with DJ Nash
2018	Fortune Rookie	Roday	Recurring
2018–19	The Resident	—N/a	Director of 3 episodes
2019	Buddy Games	Zane	
2019	Berserk	Officer Duane	
2019	Treehouse	—N/a	Director and co-writer with Todd Harthan
2020	Psych 2: Lassie Come Home	Shawn Spencer	TV film; also co-writer with Steve Franks and Andy Berman, and executive producer
2021	Psych 3: This Is Gus	Shawn Spencer	TV film; also co-writer with Steve Franks, and executive producer
2023	The Crossover	—N/a	Director of 2 episodes
2023	Buddy Games: Spring Awakening	Zane	
2024–present	High Potential	—N/a	Director of 4 episodes
TBA	Rule of Three	—N/a	Director, co-writer with Todd Harthan, and executive producer; in post-production

== Awards and nominations ==
Year	Award	Category	Nominated work	Result	Ref.
2006	Satellite Awards	Best Actor in a Series, Comedy or Musical	Psych	Nominated	
2008	NCLR ALMA Awards	Outstanding Actor in a Drama Television Series	Psych	Nominated	
2008	Online Film & Television Association	Best Actor in a Comedy Series	Psych	Nominated	
2009	EWwy Award	Best Actor in a Comedy Series	Psych	Nominated	
2009	NCLR ALMA Awards	Outstanding Actor in a Comedy Series	Psych	Nominated	
2009	Imagen Awards	Best Actor – Television	Psych	Nominated	
2009	Online Film & Television Association	Best Actor in a Comedy Series	Psych	Nominated	
2010	NAACP Image Awards	Outstanding Writing in a Comedy Series	Psych (for episode "High Top Fade Out", shared with Saladin K. Patterson)	Nominated	
2011	NCLR ALMA Awards	Favorite TV Actor – Leading Role	Psych	Nominated	
2011	Imagen Awards	Best Actor – Television	Psych	Nominated	
2012	NCLR ALMA Awards	Favorite TV Actor – Leading Role	Psych	Nominated	
2012	Imagen Awards	Best Actor – Television	Psych	Won	
2023	HCA TV Awards	Best Writing in a Broadcast Network or Cable Drama Series	A Million Little Things (for episode 5x13 One Big Thing, shared with DJ Nash)	Nominated	
2023	Humanitas Prize	Drama Teleplay	A Million Little Things (for episode 5x13 One Big Thing, shared with DJ Nash)	Nominated	
2023	3rd Astra TV Awards	Best Writing in a Broadcast Network or Cable Series, Drama	A Million Little Things (for episode 5x13 One Big Thing, shared with DJ Nash)	Nominated	
