= Kirsten Nelson =

American actress and director

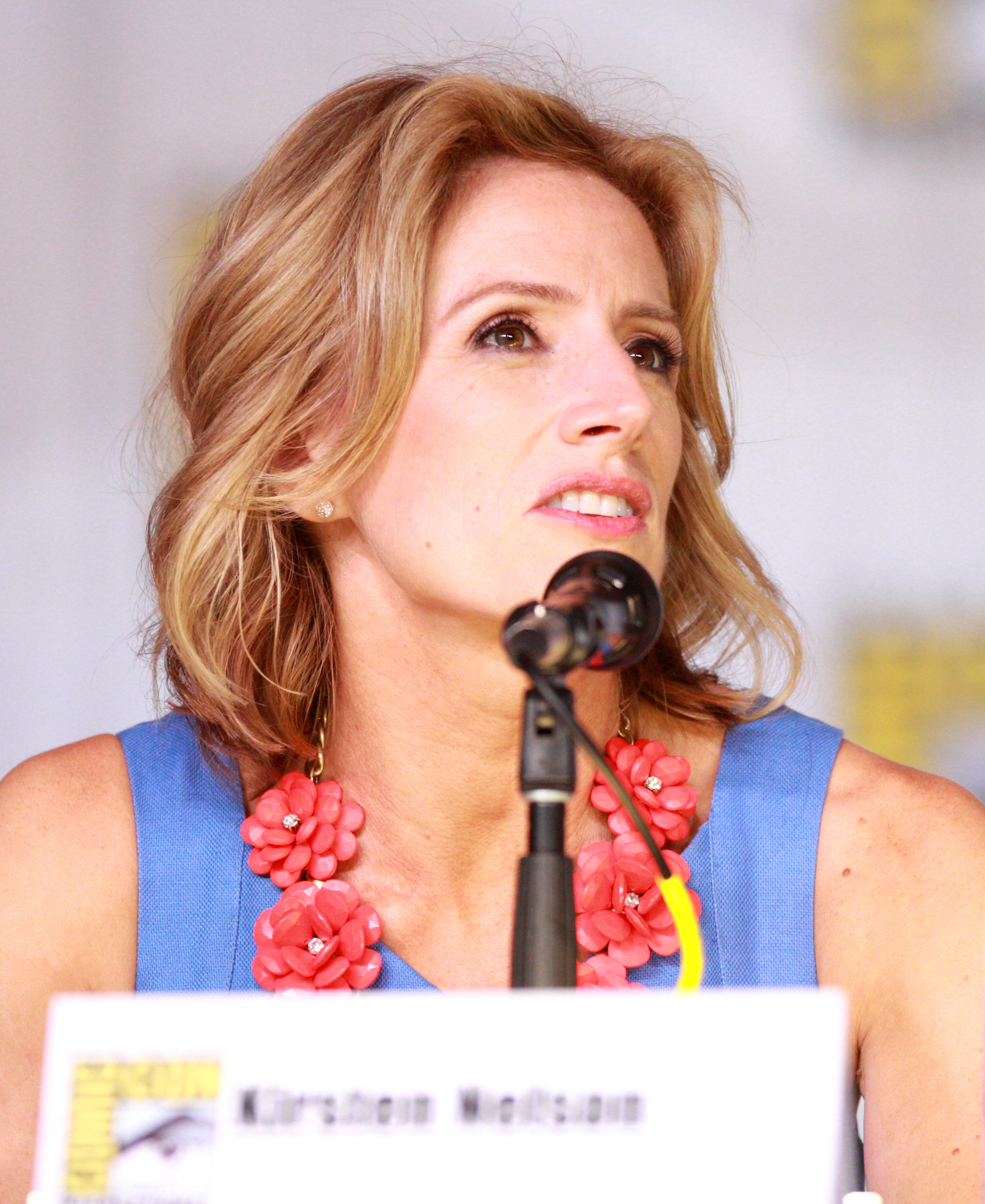
- Nelson at the 2024 GalaxyCon Columbus
- Education: Northwestern University
- Occupations: Actress, director
- Years active: 1993–present
- Spouse: (m. 1995)
- Children: 2

Kirsten Nelson is an American actress and director best known for her role as police chief Karen Vick on the TV series Psych.

== Early life and education ==
The daughter of a pastor, Kirsten Nelson was raised in Chicago. She was a member of the Chicago Children's Choir and was active at the Franklin Fine Arts Center. Nelson grew up playing the piano and singing, and said "I wanted to be a concert pianist at Carnegie Hall, that is what I wanted to do from really early on." Nelson graduated from Northwestern University.

== Career ==
Nelson was a founding member of Chicago's Roadworks Theatre Ensemble before moving to Los Angeles in 1995.

She is known for her starring role as Police Chief Karen Vick on Psych.

Nelson's career includes roles in Buffy the Vampire Slayer (as Lorraine), The O'Keefes (as Ellie O'Keefe), Baby's Day Out, The Fugitive, Frasier, Ally McBeal, The West Wing, Just Shoot Me! and Boy Meets World. She played Danielle Bishop in four episodes of 2018's K.C. Undercover.

== Personal life ==
Nelson is a member of the Evangelical Lutheran Church in America. She married in 1995 and has two children.

== Filmography ==
=== Film ===
Year	Title	Role	Notes
1993	The Fugitive	Betty	
1994	Baby's Day Out	Woman in Park	
1997	Three Women of Pain	Lani	Short
2004	Larceny	Della	
2005	War of the Worlds	Businesswoman	
2017	Limelight	Liz Chance	

=== Television ===
Year	Title	Role	Notes
1994	The Untouchables	Daisy	Episode: "The Last Gauntlet"
1996	Ned and Stacey	Wife	Episode: "The Other End"
1997	Chicago Sons	Lisa	Episode: "Love in the Time of Cicadas"
1997	Temporarily Yours	Chrystle	Episode: "Independence Day"
1997	The Practice	Judy Burke	Episode: "The Civil Right"
1999	The Pretender	ATF Agent Beth Swik	Episode: "Flesh & Blood"
1999	Boy Meets World	Jessica	Episode: "Cutting the Cord"
1999	Thanks	Polly Winthrop	Main role
2000	Pensacola: Wings of Gold	Sgt. Carol Davis / Davidson	Episode: "Answered Prayers"
2001	Just Shoot Me!	Helen	Episode: "Sid & Nina"
2001	The West Wing	Dolores Landingham (young)	Episode: "Two Cathedrals"
2002	Buffy the Vampire Slayer	Lorraine Ross	Episodes: "Doublemeat Palace", "Normal Again"
2002	Providence	Kim	Episode: "Limbo"
2002	Ally McBeal	Connie Dekumbis	Episode: "Tom Dooley"
2003, 2005	Everwood	Ellie Beals	Episodes: "Three Miners from Everwood", "Where the Heart Is"
2003	The O'Keefes	Ellie O'Keefe	Main role
2004	Frasier	Ellie	Episode: "Match Game"
2004	Stuck in the Suburbs	Susan Aarons	TV film
2005	Without a Trace	Ms. MacPherson	Episode: "Party Girl"
2005	Malcolm in the Middle	Jeanie	Episode: "Mrs. Tri-County"
2005	Mrs. Harris	TV Interviewer	TV film
2006	The Ant Bully	Hova / Generic Ant (voice)	Video game
2006–2014	Psych	Karen Vick	Main role
2008	Eli Stone	Dana Asbury	Episode: "Heartbeat"
2010	Ghost Whisperer	Sarah Davidson	Episode: "Lethal Combination"
2012	Parenthood	Mrs. Ellis	Episode: "It Is What It Is"
2012	NCIS	Beth Banks	Episode: "Psych Out"
2012	Warehouse 13	Judy Giltoy	Episode: "No Pain No Gain"
2014	Saint George	Ms. Sloan	Episode: "School's Out"
2015	Bones	Nina Slocum	Episode: "The Donor in the Drink"
2015	NCIS: New Orleans	Vivienne Lambert	Episode: "Confluence"
2017	Psych: The Movie	Karen Vick	TV film
2017	Versus	Paige	TV series
2018	K.C. Undercover	Danielle Bishop	Episodes: "The Domino Effect", "Domino: Parts 2–4"
2019	This Is Us	Dr. Green	2 episodes
2019	Bluff City Law	Emma Sutton	Episode: "You Don't Need a Weatherman"
2020	Psych 2: Lassie Come Home	Karen Vick	TV film
2021	Psych 3: This Is Gus	Karen Vick	TV film
