= Timothy Omundson =

American actor (born 1969)

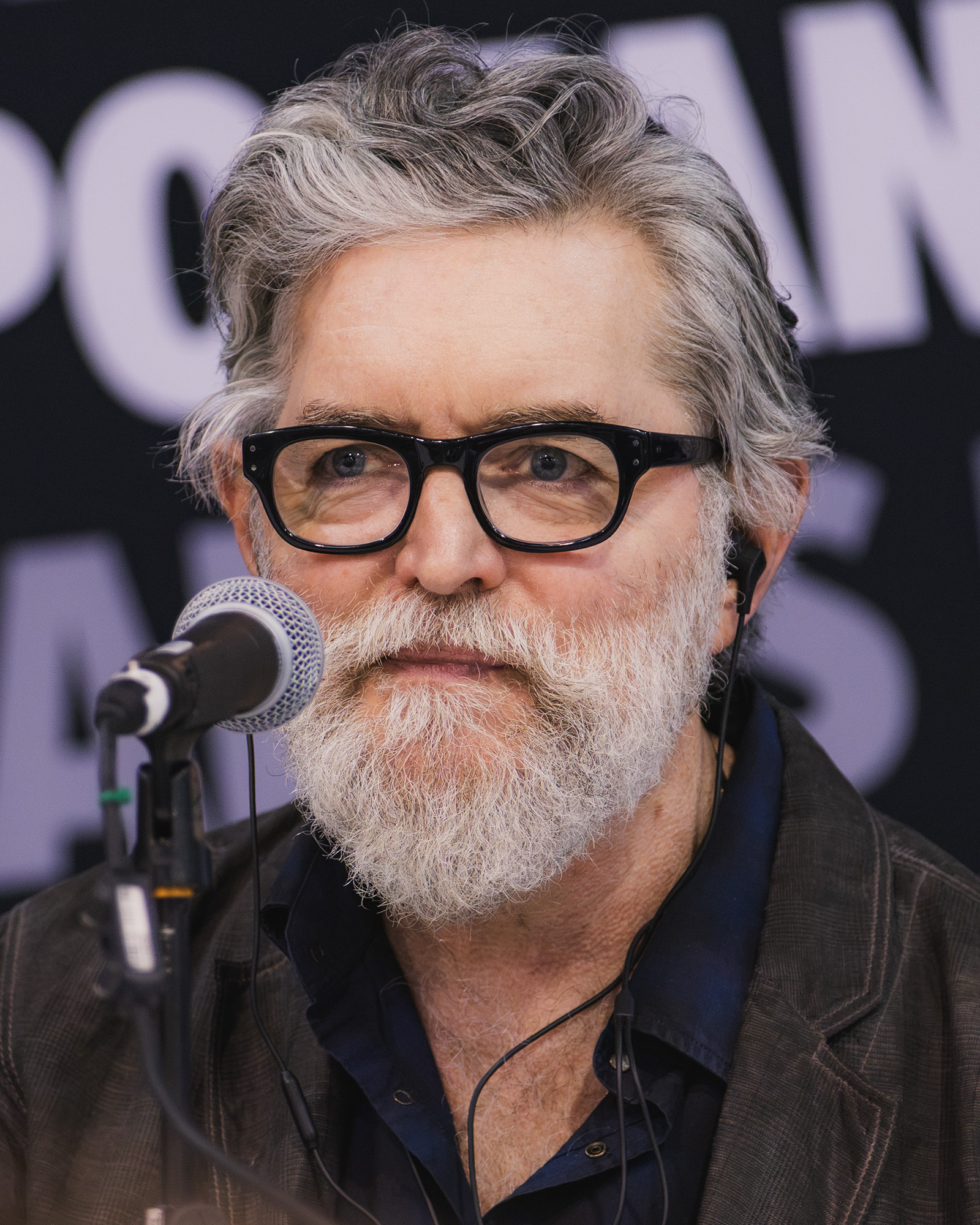
- Omundson at FanExpo Anaheim in 2026
- Born: July 29, 1969 (age 57); St. Joseph, Missouri, U.S.
- Occupation: Actor
- Years active: 1992–present
- Spouse: Allison Cowley (m. 1997)
- Children: 2

Timothy Michael Omundson (born July 29, 1969) is an American actor. He is notable for his supporting roles as Sean Potter on the CBS television series Judging Amy, Eli on the syndicated series Xena: Warrior Princess, Carlton Lassiter in Psych, King Richard on the ABC musical comedy series Galavant, and Cain in The CW's Supernatural.

== Early life and education ==
Omundson was born in St. Joseph, Missouri, to a railroad worker father and teacher mother. After his family moved to Bellevue, Washington, he started studying theater at the age of twelve at the Seattle Children's Theater, and interned at various theaters during his high school years. With acting as his primary focus, he studied during the summer of his junior year in New York City at the American Academy of Dramatic Arts. For two years in a row, he was Washington State Debate Champion in Dramatic Interpretation.

With his father, Omundson spent a month traveling in Germany and Austria when he was 13 years old, a time he views as one of the most formative months of his life. After graduating from Bellevue, Washington's Interlake High School in 1987, Omundson went to the University of Southern California where he graduated with a Bachelor of Fine Arts in Theater. He won USC's Jack Nicholson Award and James and Nony Doolittle Award for outstanding achievements in acting.

== Career ==
=== 1992–2014: Recurring roles and Psych ===
Omundson played a recurring role as Eli on the syndicated series Xena: Warrior Princess (1999–2000) and then appeared as Sean Potter on the CBS television series Judging Amy (2000–2005).

He also played a major character in the 2006 series Psych where he portrayed Detective Carlton Lassiter. This also includes three television movies based on the series produced by the USA Network called Psych: The Movie in 2017, Psych 2: Lassie Come Home in 2020, and Psych 3: This Is Gus which was released in November 2021.

=== 2015–present: Breakthrough ===
In 2014 Omundson had a guest role on The CW's Supernatural especially written for him, the role of the biblical Cain.

From 2015 to 2016, Omundson played King Richard on the ABC musical series Galavant.

Omundson voiced the character Aric Jorgan in the 2011 MMORPG Star Wars: The Old Republic. Aric Jorgan is the first companion for the Republic Trooper class.

In 2023, Omundson appeared in Percy Jackson and the Olympians as Hephaestus, the Greek God of Forges and blacksmiths. Like Omundson, the character Hephaestus is disabled and uses a cane to walk.

== Personal life ==
Omundson lives in Los Angeles, California, with his wife, Allison, and their two daughters born 2002 and 2004.

=== Health ===
In late April 2017, Omundson suffered a major stroke. Among other issues, the stroke was reported to have impacted his walking ability, which he relearned. Despite his physical issues, Omundson was able to reprise his role as Carlton Lassiter with a small part in Psych: The Movie and more substantial roles in Psych 2: Lassie Come Home and Psych 3: This Is Gus while he continued his recovery. He also began a recurring role in This Is Us where he plays a recovered stroke survivor, Gregory.

== Filmography ==
=== Film ===
Year	Title	Role	Notes
1996	Dead of Night	Club Manager	
1997	The Disappearance of Kevin Johnson	Nick Ferretti	
1997	Starship Troopers	Psychic	
2001	The Luck of the Irish	Seamus McTiernan	
2001	Swordfish	Agent Thomas	
2003	Down with Love	R.J.	
2005	Hard Pill	Brad	
2006	Mission: Impossible III	IMF Agent	
2007	Crazy	Paul Howard	Credited as Tim Omundson
2011	25 Hill	Thomas Caldwell	
2011	Voltron: The End	Lance Rainier	
2012	That Guy... Who Was in That Thing	Himself	
2017	Woody Woodpecker	Lance Walters	
2017	Wild Honey	Martin	
2017	Carter & June	Spencer Rabbit	
2019	Line of Duty	Nicolas Luke Forrester	

=== Television ===
Year	Title	Role	Notes
1992	Seinfeld	Ricky Ross	Episode: "The Cheever Letters"
1993	seaQuest DSV	Dr. Joshua Levin	4 episodes
1993	Married... with Children	Bartender	Episode: "No Ma'am"
1994	Diagnosis: Murder	Benjamin Strand	Episode: "Guardian Angel"
1994	The George Carlin Show	Bearded Man	Episode: "George Lifts the Holy Spirit"
1994	Days of Our Lives	Jerry	Episode: 7596
1995	Medicine Ball	Dr. Patrick Yates	Episode: "Wizard of Bras"
1995	Strange Luck	Steve Medavoy	Episode: "Trial Period"
1996	Mr. & Mrs. Smith	Craig Thompson	Episode: "The Space Flight Episode"
1997	Dark Skies	Jerry Rubin	Episode: "Both Sides Now"
1997	Relativity	Therapist	Episode: "Karen and Her Sisters"
1997	Jenny	Griffin	Episode: "A Girl's Gotta Get Ready for Her Close-up"
1997	Fired Up	Scott	4 episodes
1998	Frasier	Director	Episode: "Good Grief"
1998	Legacy	LLoyd Cobb	Episode: "Emma", "The Search Party"
1999	Jack & Jill	Travis Cutler	4 episodes
1999–2000	Xena: Warrior Princess	Eli	Recurring role, 6 episodes
2000	Early Edition	Antoine Gourmand	Episode: "The Play's the Thing"
2000	V.I.P.	Chick Mars	Episode: "Lights, Camera, Val"
2000	Kiss Tomorrow Goodbye	Silvio	Television film
2001	The Luck of the Irish	Seamus McTiernan	Television film
2001	NYPD Blue	Seth Werna	Episode: "Peeping Tommy"
2003	John Doe	P.J. Fox	Episode: "Tone Dead"
2004	Deadwood	Brom Garret	4 episodes
2004	Nip/Tuck	Jeremy Saddler	Episode: "Mrs. Grubman"
2000–2005	Judging Amy	Sean Potter	Main role
2005	The O.C.	Deputy DA Chris Caldwell	Episode: "The Aftermath"
2005	CSI: Miami	Ted Griffin	Episode: "Prey"
2005	Criminal Minds	Phillip Dowd	Episode: "L.D.S.K."
2006	24	Polakov	Episode: "Day 5: 2:00 p.m. – 3:00 p.m."
2006	CSI: Crime Scene Investigation	Producer	Episode: "I Like to Watch"
2006–2014	Psych	Carlton Lassiter	Main role
2007–2008	Jericho	Phil Constantino	Recurring role, 7 episodes
2008	Cold Case	Luke Ross	Episode: "Sabotage"
2008	Boston Legal	Bill Withers	Episode: "Indecent Proposals"
2009	Without a Trace	Adam Fisher	Episode: "Friends and Neighbors"
2010	The Deep End	Mr. Ollerman	Episode: Pilot
2010	Human Target	Interrogator	Episodes: "Christopher Chance", "Ilsa Pucci"
2011	The Booth at the End	Simon	Web series; main role (season 1)
2012	Warehouse 13	Coach	Episode: "No Pain No Gain"
2014–2015	Supernatural	Cain	Episodes: "First Born", "The Executioner's Song"
2015–2016	Galavant	King Richard	Main role
2015	Hot in Cleveland	Mark	Episode: "Family Affair"
2015	Key and Peele	Harry Peters	Episode: "Key & Peele's Super Bowl Special"
2015	Robot Chicken	Nigel Thornberry	Episode: "Zeb and Kevin Erotic Hot Tub Canvas"
2017–2019	American Housewife	Stan Lawton	3 episodes
2017	Lucifer	Earl "God" Johnson	Episode: "God Johnson"
2017	Downward Dog	Eric	Episode: "The Full Package"
2017	Psych: The Movie	Chief Carlton Lassiter	Television film
2018	Fortune Rookie	Tim	Episode: "Nemesis"
2019–2020	This Is Us	Gregory	7 episodes
2020	Psych 2: Lassie Come Home	Chief Carlton Lassiter	Television film
2021	Psych 3: This Is Gus	Chief Carlton Lassiter	Television film
2021	New Amsterdam	Kit Vale	Episode: "Laughter and Hope and a Sock in the Eye"
2024	Percy Jackson and the Olympians	Hephaestus	Episode: "A God Buys Us Cheeseburgers"
2026	Paradise	Chef	Episode: "Graceland"

=== Video games ===
Year	Title	Role
2003	Crimson Skies: High Road to Revenge	Nathan Zachary
2004	Star Wars: Knights of the Old Republic II – The Sith Lords	Various
2005	Star Wars: Battlefront II	Various
2011	Star Wars: The Old Republic	Aric Jorgan
