= Psych: The Movie =

2017 television film directed by Steve Franks

- Genre: Detective fiction Comedy drama
- Based on: Psych by Steve Franks
- Written by: Steve Franks; James Roday
- Directed by: Steve Franks
- Starring: James Roday; Dulé Hill; Timothy Omundson; Maggie Lawson; Kirsten Nelson; Corbin Bernsen
- Theme music composer: Steve Franks
- Country of origin: United States
- Original language: English

Production
- Executive producers: James Roday; Dulé Hill; Steve Franks; Chris Henze; Kelly Kulchak
- Producer: Chris Cheramie
- Running time: 88 minutes
- Production companies: Pacific Mountain Productions; Thruline Entertainment; Universal Cable Productions

Original release
- Network: USA Network
- Release: December 7, 2017

Psych: The Movie is a 2017 American made-for-television comedy film based on the USA Network dramedy series Psych. The film follows the Psych characters three years later in San Francisco, since the series finale in 2014. The movie aired on December 7, 2017, on the USA Network. James Roday, Dulé Hill, Timothy Omundson, Maggie Lawson, Kirsten Nelson, and Corbin Bernsen all reprised their roles from the series, with frequently recurring actors Kurt Fuller and Jimmi Simpson also appearing. The film was directed by series creator Steve Franks, who co-wrote the script with Roday. Franks has stated his hope to make five more sequels in what would become the Psych film series.

== Plot ==
As shown in the series finale, Shawn, Gus, and Juliet relocated to San Francisco, where they remain three years later. After Juliet's SFPD partner Sam Sloane is shot, Shawn and Gus attempt to find out who was responsible and why it happened. They soon learn that a mysterious organization is threatening the reputation, safety, and well-being of Juliet. At first, Juliet is reluctant to allow anyone to help her out with her problem, but an unpleasant development connected with her partner's shooting convinces her she needs Shawn's help.

Meanwhile, Shawn refuses to get married until he can locate his grandmother's engagement ring, which he had taken without permission from his dad's house, and which had been stolen from him while he was in the act of proposing to Juliet in San Francisco three years earlier. His efforts to retrieve the ring land him in hot water with a major fencer of stolen goods in the Bay Area.

Chief Vick, up for consideration for a position as police commissioner, is not aware that her daughter has started committing crimes. Gus, meanwhile, lands in trouble with his boss as a result of Shawn bringing his business to Gus's workplace. While working around all of these complications, the group encounters old friends, discover surprising pieces of information, and come to some major determinations about their futures.

== Cast ==
- James Roday as Shawn Spencer
- Dulé Hill as Burton "Gus" Guster
- Timothy Omundson as Carlton "Lassie" Lassiter
- Maggie Lawson as Juliet "Jules" O'Hara
- Kirsten Nelson as Chief Karen Vick
- Corbin Bernsen as Henry Spencer
- Zachary Levi as Thin White Duke
- Ralph Macchio as Nick Conforth
- Jimmi Simpson as Mary Lightly
- Julianna Guill as Dr. Butterfly McMillan
- Jazmyn Simon as Selene
- Robert LaSardo as El Proveedor
- Kurt Fuller as Woody Strode
- Charlotte Flair as Heather Rockrear
- Sam Huntington as Sam Sloane
- John Cena as Ewan O'Hara
- Mena Suvari as Allison Cowley
- Sage Brocklebank as Buzz McNab
- Nathan Mitchell as Black Gentleman Ninja

== Production ==
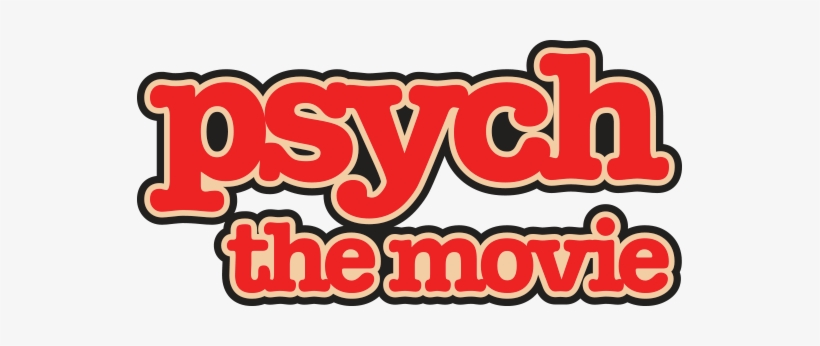
Movie's logo

Once production on the dramedy series Psych wrapped, series creator Steve Franks immediately had the idea to bring the Psych universe back in movie form later on. On May 8, 2017, USA Network confirmed that a TV movie would be produced. Franks directed the movie and co-wrote it with series star James Roday. All the series main cast returned for the TV movie, with Zachary Levi portraying the main villain, "Thin White Duke", while Jazmyn Simon – co-star Dulé Hill's real-life fiancée – plays Selene, a romantic interest for Gus. and WWE wrestler Charlotte Flair portraying Heather Rockrear. On June 28, 2017, former guest star Ralph Macchio joined the cast, reprising his role as Nick Conforth, the police academy officer who trained Shawn and Gus in season 5. Principal photography took place from May 25 to June 18 in Vancouver, British Columbia. In addition, Kurt Fuller and Jimmi Simpson reprised their respective roles of Woody Strode and Mary Lightly. The movie was released on December 7, 2017 on USA Network. Timothy Omundson returned as Carlton "Lassie" Lassiter but suffered a stroke just before shooting was to begin. The movie was partially rewritten, with Omundson appearing in only one scene that was filmed outside the main shoot in Vancouver months later.

== Reception ==
=== Ratings ===
The original American broadcast premiere received 1.26 million viewers and was the most watched scripted program of the day. It also achieved a demo of 0.5 in the 18–49 category, matching the demo from multiple Season 8 episodes, while beating the demo scores of many USA Network original shows' episodes in 2017. In the Nielsen Live+7 ratings, the film nabbed a 1.0 rating in adults 18–49 and 2.2 million viewers.

=== Critical reception ===
Entertainment Weekly graded it with a "B+." Danette Chavez of The A.V. Club gave it a "B" saying "Psych: The Movie is lively and lightweight, buoyed by Roday and Hill's bond, which hasn't diminished at all in the last three years. Its structure is classic Psych." The review aggregator website Rotten Tomatoes reported a 100% approval rating based on 14 reviews, with an average rating of 7.7/10.

== Sequel ==
At a Comic Con gathering, Steve Franks stated that he hoped to make five additional TV movies, and was looking to the Fast and Furious franchise for inspiration. Psych: The Movie 2 was greenlit on February 14, 2019, with all the main cast confirmed to return. The film was originally set to premiere later in 2019. On September 17, 2019, it was announced that the sequel had been renamed Psych 2: Lassie Come Home and would instead be airing on NBCUniversal's new streaming service, Peacock. The movie premiered on July 15, 2020, the day the service officially launched.
