= Sage Brocklebank =

Canadian actor (b. 1978)

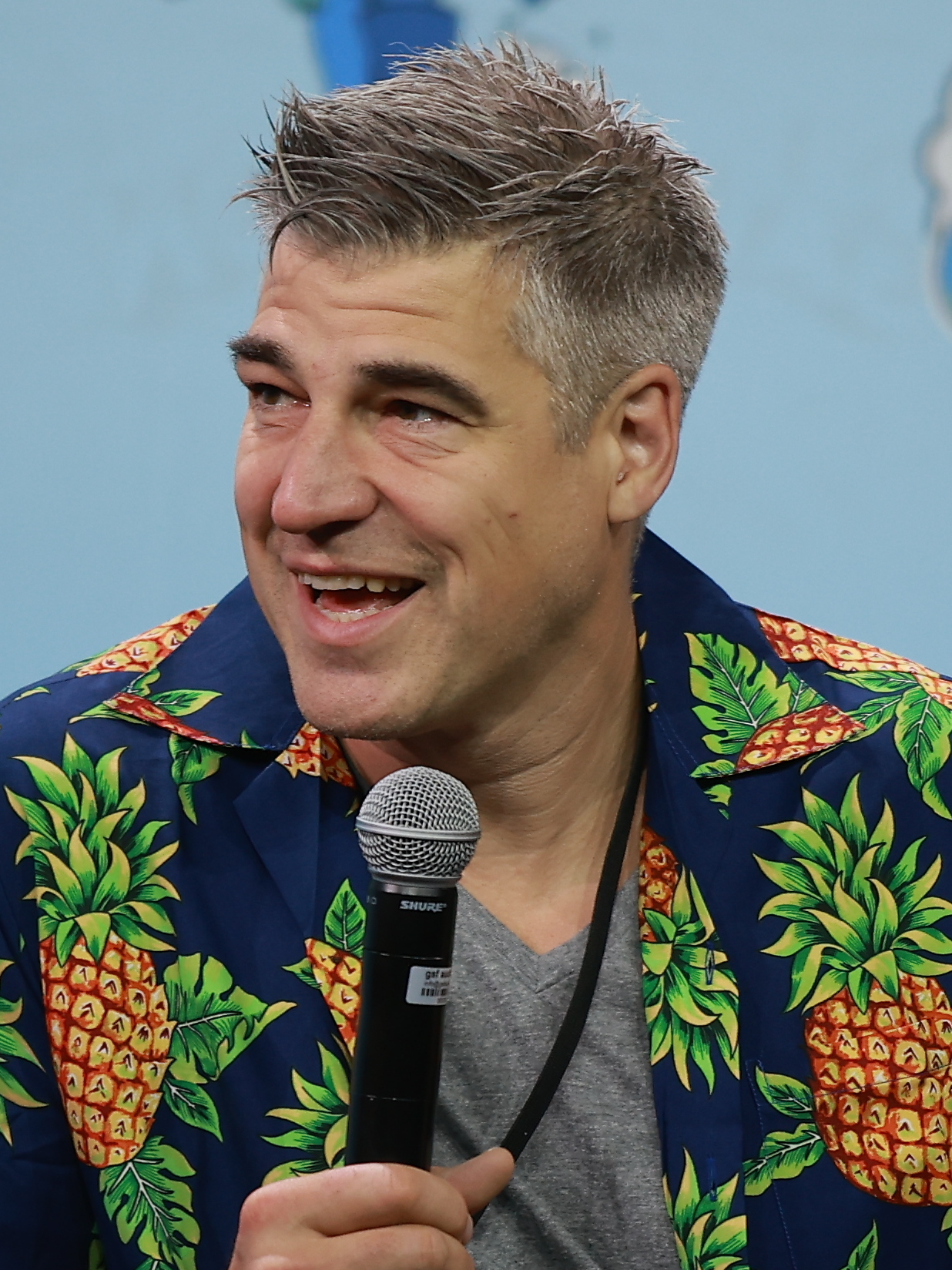
- Brocklebank at GalaxyCon Oklahoma City in 2024
- Born: January 14, 1978 (age 48); Vancouver, British Columbia, Canada
- Occupations: Actor, producer, poker player
- Years active: 2001–present
- Height: 6 ft 5 in (1.96 m)
- Website: SageBrocklebank.com

Sage Brocklebank (born January 14, 1978) is a Canadian actor best known for his role as Buzz McNab, a long-standing role on the comedy-drama Psych. He also produces movies and writes for theatre and film.

== Career ==
=== Actor ===
Since 2001 Brocklebank has appeared in over 40 film and television roles, including How I Married My High School Crush, Psych, A Bride for Christmas, Suspension, and Heavenly Match. He has also appeared in Once Upon a Time (a one-time appearance as Gaston), Arrow, Smallville, Alien Trespass, Stargate SG-1, Supernatural, and Level Up.

Brocklebank has also long been involved in theater. He has created, produced, and starred in several plays in Vancouver, including: Felony (Winner Site Specific award Vancouver Fringe Festival 2012), In a Dark Dark House, The Shape of Things and TAPE.

=== Producer ===
Brocklebank started producing films in 2014 and has now produced Suspension (2015), Real Fiction (2016), and Ariel Unraveling (2016).

== Personal life ==
Brocklebank is also a professional poker player. His parents (Brent and Judy Brocklebank) live in Vancouver, British Columbia.

== Filmography ==
Year	Title	Role	Other Note
2006	Stargate SG-1	Rand Protector	S9 E15: "Ethon"
2006	Smallville	James	Episode: "Fanatic"
2006–2014	Psych	Buzz McNab	Recurring role
2007	How I Married My High School Crush	Brian Porterson	
2009	Alien Trespass	Stu	
2011	Once Upon a Time	Gaston	Episode: "Skin Deep"
2012	Arrow	Security Guard	Episode: "Darkness on the Edge of Town"
2013	Supernatural	Theo	Episode: "Holy Terror"
2014	Almost Human	Wilkes	Episode: "You Are Here"
2017	Psych: The Movie	Buzz McNab	
2017	Everything, Everything	Astronaut	
2018	The Flash	Police officer	Episode: "Subject 9" (Uncredited)
2018	A Series of Unfortunate Events	Doorman	Episodes: "The Ersatz Elevator: Part 1", "The Ersatz Elevator: Part 2"
2018	The Predator	Transport driver	
2019	37-Teen	John	
2020	Psych 2: Lassie Come Home	Buzz McNab	Television film
2021	Legends of Tomorrow	Ross Bottini	Episode: "Speakeasy Does It"
2021	Psych 3: This Is Gus	Buzz McNab	Television film
2022	Peacemaker	Bodyguard	
