= Dulé Hill =

American actor (born 1975)

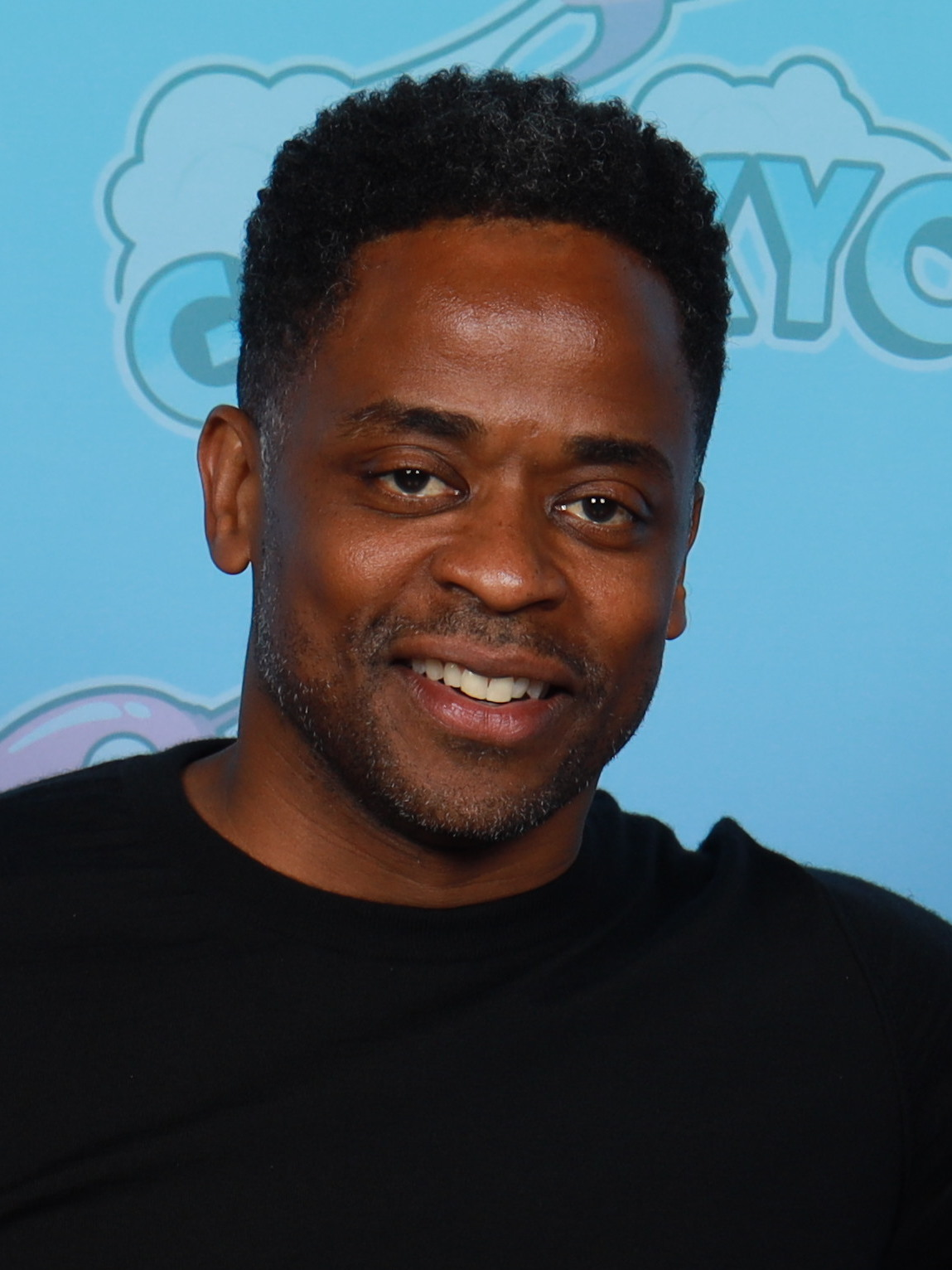
- Hill at GalaxyCon Richmond in 2025
- Born: Karim Dulé Hill; May 3, 1975 (age 51); Orange, New Jersey, U.S.
- Education: Seton Hall University (BS)
- Occupation: Actor
- Years active: 1985–present
- Spouses: Nicole Lyn (m. 2004, divorced) Jazmyn Simon (m. 2018)
- Children: 1

Karim Dulé Hill (/ˈduːleɪ/; born May 3, 1975) is an American actor. He is known for his roles as personal presidential aide and Deputy Special Assistant to the Chief of Staff Charlie Young on the NBC drama television series The West Wing, for which he received an Emmy nomination for Outstanding Supporting Actor in a Drama Series, and pharmaceutical salesman–private detective Burton "Gus" Guster on the USA Network television comedy-drama Psych. He also had minor roles in the movies Holes, The Guardian, and She's All That and a recurring role on Ballers. He joined the cast of Suits for the last two seasons, and played patriarch Bill Williams in the 2021 remake of The Wonder Years. Hill also serves as a member of the SAG-AFTRA Board of Directors.

== Early life and education ==
Hill was born in Orange, New Jersey, to Jamaican parents and was raised in Sayreville, New Jersey. He studied ballet at a young age, and appeared in the musical The Tap Dance Kid as Savion Glover's understudy on Broadway, a part he subsequently played on the show's national tour. Hill graduated from Sayreville War Memorial High School in 1993, and studied business finance at Seton Hall University and acting at William Esper Studio. While at Seton Hall, he accepted a role on Jim Henson's CityKids.

== Career ==
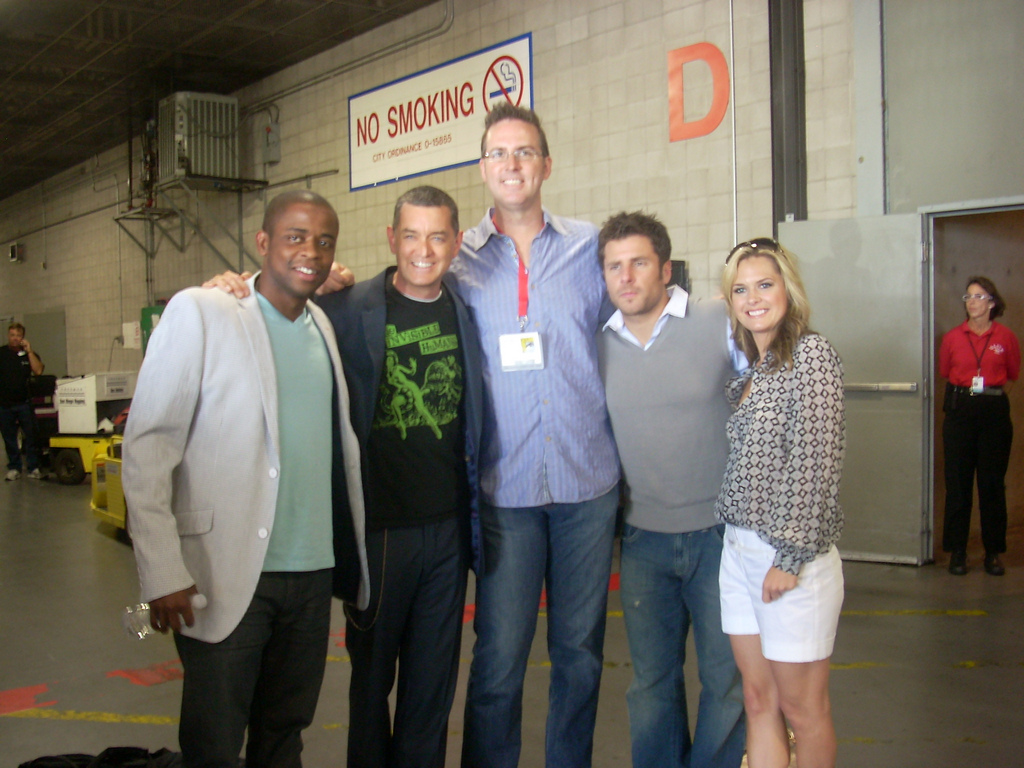
Hill with the rest of the main cast of Psych and series creator Steve Franks in 2009

In 1985, 10-year-old Hill performed a tap dance number on the MDA telethon. When the music could not be found for his routine, telethon host Jerry Lewis helped by having the orchestra play another song while Hill performed. He got his SAG card aged 13 playing the small role of "basketball boy" on the PBS children's series Ghostwriter. His first film role was in Sugar Hill in 1993 during his senior year of high school. While in college at Seton Hall, he was cast in a starring role in Bring in 'da Noise, Bring in 'da Funk on Broadway.

In 1999, Hill was cast on The West Wing as Charlie Young, the personal aide to President Josiah Bartlet, played by Martin Sheen. During the sixth season of the series, Charlie became a Special Assistant to the Chief of Staff. Hill starred as Charlie for six seasons before he chose to leave the show at the beginning of the seventh season (September 2005) to star in the pilot for the new television show Psych for the USA Network, which premiered July 7, 2006. However, when the announcement was made that The West Wing would be ending in May 2006, Hill returned for the show's last episodes.

Hill also had roles in the 1999 film She's All That starring Freddie Prinze Jr. and Rachael Leigh Cook, both of whom he later reunited with on Psych. He was in the series 10.5 as a Los Angeles doctor named Owen, in the Disney movie Holes (2003) as Sam the Onion Man (the movie itself was referenced in the Psych episode "65 Million Years Off"), and in the 2006 movie The Guardian (this was referenced in the Psych episode "You Can’t Handle this Episode"). He also joined the cast of Suits for Season 8 and 9 (this was referenced in the movie Psych 3: This Is Gus).

Hill also appeared on Broadway in Stick Fly from December 2011 to February 2012 and After Midnight in November 2013.

As a voice actor, Hill was part of the cast of the 2021 animated feature Night of the Animated Dead.

In the 2024 PBS documentary series, The Express Way with Dulé Hill, Hill narrates and participates in exploring art and diverse cultures.

== Personal life ==
Hill married actress Nicole Lyn in 2004. They had no children. Hill and Lyn separated on July 21, 2012 and filed for legal separation in November 2012 citing irreconcilable differences.

On April 14, 2017, Hill became engaged to girlfriend and Ballers co-star Jazmyn Simon. He and Simon married in April 2018. In 2019, Hill and his wife announced the birth of their son.

== Filmography ==
=== Film ===
Year	Title	Role	Notes
1988	Good Old Boy: A Delta Boyhood	Robert E. Lee	
1994	Sugar Hill	Young Romello	
1999	She's All That	Preston	
2000	Men of Honor	Red Tail	
2003	Holes	Sam	
2004	Sexual Life	Jerry	
2005	Edmond	Sharper	
2005	The Numbers	Brady	Short
2006	The Guardian	Ken Weatherly	
2007	Whisper	Detective Miles	
2008	Remarkable Power	Reggie	
2012	Gayby	Adam	
2012	Nostalgia	Gabe Robinson Jr.	Short
2012	Gator Farm	Jay	Short
2013	Miss Dial	Popcorn Caller	
2015	Gravy	Delroy	
2016	Sleight	Angelo	
2021	Locked Down	David	
2021	Night of the Animated Dead	Ben (voice)	
2021	Hypnotic	Detective Wade Rollins	

=== Television ===
Year	Title	Role	Notes
1986	The Dick Cavett Show	Himself	with Hinton Battle and Harold Nicholas promoting The Tap Dance Kid
1992	Ghostwriter	Basketball Boy	Episode: "To Catch a Creep: Part 1"
1993	CityKids	John	Main cast
1993	American Playhouse		Episode: "Hallelujah"
1994	New York Undercover	Georgie	Episode: "CAT"
1995	All My Children	Simon	Episode: "6 July 1995"
1995	New York News	Raymond Gates	Episode: "New York News"
1997	The Ditchdigger's Daughters	Young Donald	TV movie
1997	Color of Justice	Kameel	TV movie
1997	Cosby	Marcus	Episode: "Shall We Dance?"
1998	Smart Guy	Calvin Tierney	Episode: "Gotta Dance"
1999	The Jamie Foxx Show	Featured Dancer	Episode: "Taps for Royal"
1999	Love Songs	Leroy	TV movie
1999	Chicken Soup for the Soul		Episode: "Mother's Day"
1999–2006	The West Wing	Charlie Young	Main cast
2004	10.5	Dr. Owen Hunter	Miniseries
2006–14	Psych	Burton "Gus" Guster	Main cast
2015–17	Ballers	Larry Siefert	Recurring cast (seasons 1–3)
2017	Seven Bucks Digital Studios	Larry Siefert	Episode: "Get Pumped Up for 'Ballers'; Season 3 with the Rock"
2017	Doubt	Albert Cobb	Main cast
2017	Psych: The Movie	Burton "Gus" Guster	TV movie
2017–19	Suits	Alex Williams	Recurring cast (s. 7), main cast (s. 8–9)
2019	Styling Hollywood	Himself	Episode: "Taraji & Yara & Zazie, Oh My!"
2019–21	Muppet Babies	Mr. Manny (voice)	5 episodes
2020	Psych 2: Lassie Come Home	Burton "Gus" Guster	TV movie
2020	Black Monday	Marcus Duane Wainwright III	Recurring cast (season 2)
2021	Psych 3: This Is Gus	Burton "Gus" Guster	TV movie
2021–23	The Wonder Years	Bill Williams	Main cast
2022	This Is Us	Kenny Brooks	Episode: "The Train"
2024	The Express Way with Dulé Hill	Himself	Miniseries
2025	Good American Family	Brandon Drysdale	Recurring role
2027	The Rookie	TBA	TBA

== Theatre ==
Year	Title	Role	Other Notes
1983	The Tap Dance Kid	understudy	Broadway
1984	The Tap Dance Kid	Willie	Broadway National Tour
1987	The Little Rascals	Stymie	Goodspeed Opera House
1989	Shenandoah	Gabriel	Paper Mill Playhouse
1989	Black and Blue	replacement understudy	Broadway
1995	Bring in 'da Noise, Bring in 'da Funk	The Kid	The Public Theater
1996	Bring in 'da Noise, Bring in 'da Funk	The Kid	Broadway
2007	Dutchman	Clay	Cherry Lane Theatre
2011	Stick Fly	Spoon (Kent) LeVay	
2013	After Midnight	The Host	
2017	Lights Out: Nat "King" Cole	Nat "King" Cole	People's Light and Theatre Company
2019	Lights Out: Nat "King" Cole	Nat "King" Cole	Geffen Playhouse
2025	Lights Out: Nat "King" Cole	Nat "King" Cole	New York Theatre Workshop

== Awards and nominations ==
Year	Association	Category	Work	Result
2001	Screen Actors Guild Awards	Outstanding Ensemble in a Drama Series	The West Wing	Won
2001	Image Awards	Outstanding Supporting Actor in a Drama Series	The West Wing	Nominated
2002	Screen Actors Guild Awards	Outstanding Ensemble in a Drama Series	The West Wing	Won
2002	Emmy Awards	Best Supporting Actor in a Drama Series	The West Wing	Nominated
2002	Image Awards	Outstanding Supporting Actor in a Drama Series	The West Wing	Nominated
2003	Screen Actors Guild Awards	Outstanding Ensemble in a Drama Series	The West Wing	Nominated
2004	Screen Actors Guild Awards	Outstanding Ensemble in a Drama Series	The West Wing	Nominated
2004	Image Awards	Outstanding Supporting Actor in a Drama Series	The West Wing	Nominated
2005	Screen Actors Guild Awards	Outstanding Ensemble in a Drama Series	The West Wing	Nominated
2005	Image Awards	Outstanding Supporting Actor in a Drama Series	The West Wing	Nominated
2005	Image Awards	Outstanding Actor in a Television Movie, Mini-Series or Dramatic Special	10.5	Nominated
2006	Screen Actors Guild Awards	Outstanding Ensemble in a Drama Series	The West Wing	Nominated
2008	Image Awards	Outstanding Actor in a Comedy Series	Psych	Nominated
2009	Image Awards	Outstanding Supporting Actor in a Comedy Series	Psych	Nominated
2026	Drama Desk Award	Outstanding Lead Performance in a Musical	Lights Out: Nat “King” Cole	Pending
2026	Lucille Lortel Award	Outstanding Lead Performer in a Musical	Lights Out: Nat “King” Cole	Nominated
