= Rosewood (TV series) =

TV series

- Genre: Police procedural Medical drama
- Created by: Todd Harthan
- Starring: Morris Chestnut; Jaina Lee Ortiz; Gabrielle Dennis; Anna Konkle; Domenick Lombardozzi; Lorraine Toussaint; Sam Huntington; Eddie Cibrian
- Composer: Gabriel Mann
- Country of origin: United States
- Original language: English
- No. of seasons: 2
- No. of episodes: 44

Production
- Executive producers: Todd Harthan; Richard Shepard; Marty Bowen; Wyck Godfrey
- Camera setup: Single-camera
- Running time: 42–45 minutes
- Production companies: Temple Hill Productions; Nickels Productions; 20th Century Fox Television

Original release
- Network: Fox
- Release: September 23, 2015 – April 28, 2017

Rosewood is an American police procedural drama series that aired on Fox from September 23, 2015, to April 28, 2017. The series was created by Todd Harthan, starring Morris Chestnut as Dr. Beaumont Rosewood Jr., a private pathologist working in Miami, Florida, in high demand with law enforcement. On October 16, 2015, Fox picked up Rosewood for a full season of 22 episodes. On April 7, 2016, Fox renewed the series for a second season which premiered on September 22, 2016.

On May 9, 2017, Fox cancelled the series after two seasons.

== Cast and characters ==
=== Main ===
- Morris Chestnut as Dr. Beaumont Darius "Rosie" Rosewood, Jr., a private pathologist and consultant to the MDPD
- Jaina Lee Ortiz as Det. Annalise Villa a tough-as-nails detective, and Rosie's partner
- Gabrielle Dennis as Dr. Pippy Rosewood, Rosie's sister. Pippy calls her brother by his nickname of Rosie, even though it is a variation of their family name Rosewood.
- Anna Konkle as Dr. Tara Milly Izikoff (TMI), Pippy's girlfriend/wife
- Domenick Lombardozzi as Captain/Detective Ira Hornstock
- Lorraine Toussaint as Donna Rosewood, Rosie and Pippy's mother
- Sam Huntington as Dr. Mitchie Mendelson (season 2; recurring, season 1)
- Eddie Cibrian as Captain Ryan Slade (season 2)
- Kamal Angelo Bolden as Ju-Ju

=== Recurring ===
- Letoya Luckett as Tawnya
- Nicole Ari Parker as Dr. Kat Crawford
- Taye Diggs as Dr. Mike Boyce
- Rayna Tharani as Felicia
- Lisa Vidal as Daisy Villa
- Joy Bryant as Dr. Erica Kincaid
- Tia Mowry-Hardrict as Cassie
- Alysia Reiner as Lilian Izikoff
- Sherri Shepherd as Dr. Anita Eubanks
- Manny Montana as Marcos Villa
- Eric Winter as Dr. Adrian Webb

=== Guest ===
- Sam Witwer as Heath Casablanca
- Mackenzie Astin as Dr. Max Cahn
- Adrian Pasdar as Dr. Derek Foster
- Vondie Curtis Hall as Dr. Beaumont Rosewood Sr.
- Michael Irby as Agent Giordano
- Ryan W. Garcia as IAD Agent Malcute
- Adam Butterfield as Bobby Gabootz
- Katharine Isabelle as Naomi
- Carla Gallo as Daisy Wick (reprising her role from Bones)
- Veronica Rose as The Teenage Girlfriend

== Episodes ==
Season	Episodes	Originally released	
Season	Episodes	First released	Last released
1	22	September 23, 2015	May 25, 2016
2	22	September 22, 2016	April 28, 2017

=== Season 1 (2015–16) ===
No. overall	No. in season	Title	Directed by	Written by	Original release date	Prod. code	US viewers (millions)
1	1	"Pilot"	Richard Shepard	Todd Harthan	September 23, 2015	1AYJ01	7.54
Private pathologist Dr. Beaumont Rosewood is asked to solve the murder of a young woman who was once his mother's student. This forces him to work with new Miami Police Detective Annalise Villa, who has relocated back after the death of her husband.
2	2	"Fireflies and Fidelity"	Timothy Busfield	Todd Harthan	September 30, 2015	1AYJ02	6.24
When an unexpected piece of evidence surfaces in the 305, Rosewood and Villa attempt to solve a serious crime involving a very well-off Miami man. Meanwhile, Rosewood struggles to balance a new romantic interest with the demands of his mother, and Villa runs into trouble on the job.
3	3	"Have-Nots and Hematomas"	Milan Cheylov	Andy Berman	October 7, 2015	1AYJ03	5.75
A series of mysterious deaths pulls Rosewood off the glamorous promenades of South Beach when a troubled young genius stands accused of murder, and the only one who believes in his innocence is Rosewood. He must contend with a colorful new adversary, escalating health problems and a burgeoning romantic relationship, while Villa's inability to connect with people hampers her own ability to investigate the case.
4	4	"Vandals and Vitamins"	Eriq La Salle	Teleplay by : Eli Attie; Story by : Eli Attie & John Sotos	October 14, 2015	1AYJ04	5.03
When Rosewood and Villa suspect a brilliant doctor has killed two of his patients, they must find a way to make their case with limited evidence. Meanwhile, Villa spars with Captain Hornstock when he discourages her from pursuing an uncertain case. Also, Rosewood receives an anonymous letter revealing something that could change his life forever.
5	5	"Necrosis and New Beginnings"	Eric Laneuville	Nkechi Okoro Carroll	October 21, 2015	1AYJ05	5.27
Rosewood and Villa make it their mission to seek justice for a murder victim who is an ex-con with ties to a Little Haiti gang. Meanwhile, Villa struggles with dreams she's been having, and Rosewood deals with an unexpected turn in his relationship with Kat. Adrian Pasdar and Nicole Ari Parker Guest-Star
6	6	"Policies and Ponies"	Michael Zinberg	Evan Bleiweiss	November 4, 2015	1AYJ06	5.05
When Captain Hornstock becomes the prime suspect in his third ex-wife's murder, he turns to the only two people he can trust to prove his innocence, Rosewood and Villa, forcing them to repair their severely damaged relationship in hopes of clearing his name. Meanwhile, Shirley's revelations lead to emotional consequences for Rosewood and Pippy.
7	7	"Quadriplegia and Quality Time"	Terrence O'Hara	Marqui Jackson	November 11, 2015	1AYJ07	5.17
While testifying for the prosecution during a murder trial, Rosewood engages in a pathology chess match with the expert witness for the defense – his father. Then, when Donna and Beaumont Sr. make an unexpected announcement, it has unforeseen consequences.
8	8	"Bloodhunt and Beats"	James Roday	Andy Berman & Jameal Turner	November 18, 2015	1AYJ08	4.72
Rosewood and Villa are thrust into the underbelly of the everglades when they team up with Hornstock's ex-partner-turned-bounty hunter, Floyd Butters, to catch a murderer. Meanwhile, Pippy is given the opportunity of a lifetime to launch her music career, and Villa tries to reconnect with her mom.
9	9	"Fashionistas and Fasciitis"	Milan Cheylov	Lisa Morales	November 25, 2015	1AYJ09	4.64
Amidst the glitz and glamour of Miami Fashion Week, there's a plot to kill one of the city's hottest new designers, who turns to Rosewood for help. As the case takes Rosewood and Villa from the catwalk to the perp walk, Rosewood learns of his shared past with the victim. When he enlists the aid of his best friend, Dr. Mike Boyce, Rosewood unintentionally gives Villa the jolt she needs to get back into the dating pool. Potential love also is in the air for Donna, who tries her hand at online dating. Meanwhile, Pippy and TMI find their romance on the skids when Pippy discovers TMI has kept an important secret from her.
10	10	"Aortic Atresia and Art Installations"	Millicent Shelton	Todd Harthan & Evan Bleiweiss	December 2, 2015	1AYJ10	5.04
Rosewood and Villa dive into the hip Miami art scene to catch a serial killer who is on the cusp of creating a "masterpiece". When TMI's ex-fiancé, FBI Agent Heath Casablanca, joins the hunting party, he threatens to sabotage Pippy and TMI's relationship. Heath also butts heads with Hornstock, who stands to take over as police chief if he can catch the killer. Meanwhile, an impending lawsuit against Rosewood threatens the lifeline of Magic City Lab and forces Donna to take a long hard look at the way her son lives his life. Also, Rosewood tries to protect Villa from his best friend, Mike.
11	11	"Paralytics and Priorities"	Milan Cheylov	Diana Mendez	March 2, 2016	1AYJ11	3.52
The search for the serial killer takes a very personal turn, as Rosewood and Villa must follow a trail of clues left for Rosie, before another victim falls prey. As things heat up between Villa and Mike, Villa escapes by throwing herself deeper into the case, which inevitably pushes her closer to Rosewood. Meanwhile, Donna intervenes when Pippy decides to give TMI's absentee mother a piece of her mind. Plus, the Chief position is Hornstock's, if he is willing to pay a stiff price.
12	12	"Negative Autopsies and New Partners"	Sarah Pia Anderson	Marqui Jackson	March 9, 2016	1AYJ12	3.72
Hornstock forces Villa to pick a new partner and she immediately clashes with the one assigned to her. After learning she cost Hornstock the Chief job, Villa tries to make herself less of a liability, which reveals a surprising pattern in her life. Meanwhile, the death of a victim forces Pippy to offer her assistance in the investigation and to revisit her past. The case stirs up old wounds for the entire Rosewood family and creates new ones for her and TMI. Meanwhile, Rosewood's slight health scare finds him in search of a new cardiologist.
13	13	"Ballistics and BFFs"	Vahan Moosekian	D. Harrington Miller	March 16, 2016	1AYJ13	3.72
Rosewood's partnership with Villa faces an uncertain future when she's paired with a recent transfer to the East Miami PD with whom she shares a past. As Villa and her new partner investigate the death of a suburban dentist who ran a yuppie drug ring, Rosewood can't shake the feeling that his "replacement" is more than meets the eye. Meanwhile, a new medical examiner, Dr. Anita Eubanks, is brought in to help with the investigation and Hornstock's insecurities hinder his ability to handle the public relations side of the case, forcing him to turn to an unlikely source for help.
14	14	"Hydrocephalus and Hard Knocks"	James Roday	Nkechi Okoro Carroll	March 23, 2016	1AYJ14	3.74
Rosie insists on celebrating his and Villa's nine-and-a-half month anniversary as partners, landing them in the middle of a case involving none other than Julius "Ju-Ju" Beeman, their confidential informant. But, this time, Joo-Joo is the prime suspect. As Rosie and Villa work to uncover the truth, even if it means putting Ju-Ju away for life, Villa discovers a whole new side of him she never saw coming. Meanwhile, Villa's choice for her new home has Rosie worried about the new path she's on, while Pippy and TMI struggle to balance old friends and family.
15	15	"Atherosclerosis and the Alabama Flim-Flam"	David Crabtree	Andy Berman & Evan Bleiweiss	March 30, 2016	1AYJ15	5.20
While at an out-of-town forensic pathology convention, Rosewood unintentionally reveals the blueprint to commit the perfect murder during the keynote speech. Tormented and armed only with a hunch, Rosewood enlists Villa to help solve the crime and, while investigating undercover, sparks fly unexpectedly between them. Hornstock and Floyd Butters are called upon for extra help. Meanwhile, Pippy and TMI have locked themselves in the lab overnight to help with the investigation and TMI receives an unexpected visit from her estranged father.
16	16	"Dead Drops and Disentanglement"	David Solomon	Jameal Turner	April 13, 2016	1AYJ16	4.53
Rosewood investigates the suspicious death of a man with medical issues similar to his own, forcing him to slightly adjust the tint on his Rosie-colored glasses and confront his own mortality. Also adding to his stress, he finds himself trapped between Donna and his girlfriend/cardiologist, Dr. Erica Kincaid, and their dueling opinions over what's best for Rosewood – medically and personally. Meanwhile, Hornstock enlists the help of Villa as he attempts to reconnect with one of the witnesses linked to the case, his estranged teenage daughter.
17	17	"Silkworms y Silencio"	Roxann Dawson	Teleplay by : Todd Harthan; Story by : Jake Zebede	April 20, 2016	1AYJ17	4.64
Rosewood and Villa investigate the murder of a telenovela star, holding a mirror up to their own relationship as they explore the world of off-screen intrigue. Meanwhile, Erica strong-arms her way into Rosewood's life, much to Donna's chagrin. Then, Rosewood's precious GTO is stolen and Villa reconnects with her mother, Daisie.
18	18	"Thorax, Thrombosis & Threesomes"	Ian Toynton	Marc Halsey	April 27, 2016	1AYJ18	4.86
Rosewood battles another pathologist on a case involving two bodies and cash found on the beach. Daisie becomes uncontrollable when she moves in with her daughter and Tara has to deal with the friendship of Pippy and Cassie.
19	19	"Sudden Death & Shades Deep"	David Straiton	Teleplay by : Marqui Jackson & D. Harrington Miller; Story by : Eli Attie	May 4, 2016	1AYJ19	4.35
The death of a musician and jingle writer mystifies Rosewood and Villa about the cause of his death. Donna suggests Mitchie look into Erica's past.
20	20	"Keratin & Kissyface"	James Roday	Evan Bleiweiss & Diana Mendez	May 11, 2016	1AYJ20	4.32
The murder of an ATF agent who was deep undercover is connected to a cold case from twelve years previous.
21	21	"Wooberite & The Women of Rosewood"	Eric Laneuville	Andy Berman	May 18, 2016	1AYJ21	4.77
An old flame of Rosewood's returns and enlists his help to find a wealthy patient of hers that has disappeared.
22	22	"Badges & Bombshells"	Milan Cheylov	Todd Harthan & Marc Halsey	May 25, 2016	1AYJ22	3.50
Rosewood and Villa come close to revealing their true feelings for each other, but Rosewood investigates something significant behind her back. Rosewood and Pippy inquire about Donna's love life and Pippy and Tara end their engagement.

=== Season 2 (2016–17) ===
No. overall	No. in season	Title	Directed by	Written by	Original release date	Prod. code	US viewers (millions)
23	1	"Forward Motion and Frat Life"	Deran Sarafian	Todd Harthan	September 22, 2016	2AYJ01	3.65
A new captain shakes up the East Miami Police Department; Miami's brash, young mayor gets involved in the investigation when the person he was mentoring is mysteriously murdered.
24	2	"Secrets and Silent Killers"	Deran Sarafian	Nkechi Okoro Carroll	September 29, 2016	2AYJ02	3.60
Rosie and Villa must establish the true identity of a murder victim who appears to have died three years prior; TMI attempts to reconnect with Pippy; Donna struggles to keep a secret from her family.
25	3	"Eddie and the Empire State of Mind"	Eric Laneuville	Andy Berman	October 6, 2016	2AYJ03	3.77
Rosewood and Villa head to New York to investigate Eddie's death; Slade and Hornstock attempt to take down a Miami prostitution ring.
26	4	"Boatopsy and Booty"	Cherie Nowlan	Marc Halsey	October 13, 2016	2AYJ04	3.51
When young people partying on a boat discover a body, Rosie and Villa follow the investigation into the world of deep sea treasure hunting.
27	5	"Spirochete and Santeria"	Michael Zinberg	Evan Bleiweiss	October 27, 2016	2AYJ05	3.39
The team is confused by a man who comes into the lab requesting to prepay for his autopsy.
28	6	"Tree Toxins and Three Stories"	Kenneth Fink	Marqui Jackson & D. Harrington Miller	November 3, 2016	2AYJ06	3.39
When pathology students work with the team on a cold case, their findings impact the entire Rosewood family.
29	7	"Lidocaine and Long-Term Lust"	David Crabtree	Melissa Scrivner Love	November 10, 2016	2AYJ07	3.33
An investigation into the death of a beautiful Miami model the night after her beachfront photo shoot leads Rosie and Villa into the world of plastic surgery.
30	8	"Prosopagnosia and Parrot Fish"	David Rodriguez	Jameal Turner	November 17, 2016	2AYJ08	3.07
An investigation into the death of a food truck vendor with a crooked history reveals the victim has a connection to Slade's past.
31	9	"Half-Life and Havana Nights"	Oz Scott	Diana Mendez	December 1, 2016	2AYJ09	3.11
The investigation into Gerald's case leads Rosewood and Villa to Cuba, where they confront two new mysteries; TMI brings her former roommate to help decipher evidence.
32	10	"Bacterium and the Brothers Panitch"	James Roday	Andy Berman & Evan Bleiweiss	January 6, 2017	2AYJ10	3.03
When a hostage situation emerges at the East Miami Police Department, Rosewood, Villa, and Slade become trapped inside. In order to keep his team alive, Rosewood must solve a medical mystery involving a prison inmate.
33	11	"Mummies and Meltdowns"	Deran Sarafian	Todd Harthman & Nkechi Okoro	January 13, 2017	2AYJ11	2.86
The team investigates when the body of a music producer turns up on a yacht; Rosewood faces a startling revelation about Tawnya.
34	12	"Asphyxiation and Aces"	Vahan Moosekian	Marc Halsey	January 20, 2017	2AYJ12	2.87
Rosewood and Villa unravel an illusory case when an escape artist is found dead in a wooden trunk; Hornstock's time with the East Miami PD may be coming to an end; Rosewood gets to know Adrian to see if he's the right guy for Villa.
35	13	"Puffer Fish & Personal History"	James Roday	Marqui Jackson	January 27, 2017	2AYJ13	2.83
A victim unexpectedly awakens on Rosie's autopsy table, throwing the team into the world of documentary filmmakers.
36	14	"White Matter and the Ways Back"	Eric Laneville	D. Harrington Miller	February 3, 2017	2AYJ14	2.61
A mysterious death in an empty high-rise leads Rosie and Villa to investigate a former child star's inner circle; Rosie feels the effects of Donna's new involvement at Magic City; Hornstock's happier outlook brings his relationship with Rosie to a new level.
37	15	"Clavicle Trauma & Closure"	Kelli Williams	Melissa Scrivner Love	February 10, 2017	2AYJ15	2.91
After a former tech millionaire's body is found staged as a suicide, Rosie considers helping an old foe.
38	16	"Benzodiazepine & the Benjamins"	Millicent Shelton	Eric Bleiweiss & Jake Mateo Zebede	February 17, 2017	2AYJ16	2.74
The hunt for a counterfeit currency kingpin allows the team to get a glimpse into Villa's past. The FBI comes in to work the case with the EMPD.
39	17	"Radiation & Rough Landings"	Hanelle Culpepper	Marc Halse & Diana Mendez	February 24, 2017	2AYJ17	2.69
When a female astronaut is found dead in a tree, Rosie and Villa launch an investigation into America's space program. Elsewhere, Rosie puts the owner of his match kidney to the test.
40	18	"Fairy Tales & Frozen Truths"	Ian Toynton	Megan McNamara	March 31, 2017	2AYJ18	2.53
Rosie and Villa investigate the death of a frozen princess. Villa's brother begins meeting the important people in her life, but is still not ready to reunite with his mother.
41	19	"Naegleria & Neighborhood Watch"	Gregg Simon	Marqui Jackson & Jameal Turner	April 7, 2017	2AYJ19	2.48
A vigilante in Little Havana causes problems for the EMPD, but the investigation gives Marcos Villa an opportunity to shine. Rosie receives Slade's kidney, but complications arise.
42	20	"Calliphoridae & Country Roads"	David Crabtree	Melissa Scrivner Love & D. Harrington Miller	April 14, 2017	2AYJ20	2.48
TMI tags along with Rosie and Villa as they investigate the murder of the mayor back in her hometown.
43	21	"Amparo & the American Dream"	Vahan Moosekian	Andy Berman & Michael Notarlie	April 21, 2017	2AYJ21	2.85
Rosewood and Villa investigate a teacher's death and learn secrets from Slade's past.
44	22	"Blistering Heat & Brotherly Love"	Deran Sarafian	Todd Harthan	April 28, 2017	2AYJ22	2.96
The team tracks down a group of criminals who are suspected of robbing a jewelry store.

== Reception ==
Rosewood has been met with generally negative reviews from critics, despite its good ratings on Fox. On Rotten Tomatoes, season 1 has a rating of 9%, based on 112 reviews, with an average rating of 3.6/10. Metacritic gave season one of the shows a score of 37 out of 100, based on 23 reviews, signifying "generally unfavorable reviews".

=== Ratings ===
Season	Timeslot (ET)	Episodes	Premiered		Ended		TV season	Rank	Viewers (in millions, including DVR)
Season	Timeslot (ET)	Episodes	Date	Premiere viewers (in millions)	Date	Finale viewers (in millions)	TV season	Rank	Viewers (in millions, including DVR)
1	Wednesday 8:00 pm	22	September 23, 2015	7.54	May 25, 2016	3.50	2015–16	74	TBA
2	Thursday 8:00 pm (episodes 1–9); Friday 8:00 pm (episodes 10–22)	22	September 22, 2016	3.65	April 28, 2017	2.96	2016–17	TBA	TBA

==== Season 1 (2015–16) ====
Viewership and ratings per episode of Rosewood
No.	Title	Air date	Rating/share (18–49)	Viewers (millions)	Ref.
1	"Pilot"	September 23, 2015	2.4/9	7.54	
2	"Fireflies and Fidelity"	September 30, 2015	2.0/7	6.24	
3	"Have-Nots and Hematomas"	October 7, 2015	1.8/6	5.75	
4	"Vandals and Vitamins"	October 14, 2015	1.4/5	5.03	
5	"Necrosis and New Beginnings"	October 21, 2015	1.6/5	5.27	
6	"Policies and Ponies"	November 4, 2015	1.5/5	5.05	
7	"Quadriplegia and Quality Time"	November 11, 2015	1.4/5	5.17	
8	"Bloodhunt and Beats"	November 18, 2015	1.5/5	4.72	
9	"Fashionistas and Fasciitiss"	November 25, 2015	1.2/5	4.64	
10	"Aortic Ateresia and Art Installations"	December 2, 2015	1.5/5	5.04	
11	"Paralytics and Priorities"	March 2, 2016	0.9/3	3.52	
12	"Negative Autopsies and New Partners"	March 9, 2016	0.9/3	3.72	
13	"Ballistics and BFFs"	March 16, 2016	0.9/3	3.72	
14	"Hydrocephalus and Hard Knocks"	March 23, 2016	1.0/4	3.74	
15	"Atherosclerosis and the Alabama Flim-Flam"	March 30, 2016	1.4/5	5.20	
16	"Dead Drops and Disentanglement"	April 13, 2016	1.2/4	4.53	
17	"Silkworms y Silencio"	April 20, 2016	1.2/5	4.64	
18	"Thorax, Thrombosis & Threesomes"	April 27, 2016	1.3/5	4.86	
19	"Sudden Death & Shades Deep"	May 4, 2016	1.2/4	4.35	
20	"Keratin & Kissyface"	May 11, 2016	1.1/4	4.32	
21	"Wooberite & The Women of Rosewood"	May 18, 2016	1.4/5	4.77	
22	"Badges & Bombshells"	May 25, 2016	0.8/3	3.50	

==== Season 2 (2016–17) ====
Viewership and ratings per episode of Rosewood
No.	Title	Air date	Rating/share (18–49)	Viewers (millions)	DVR (18–49)	DVR viewers (millions)	Total (18–49)	Total viewers (millions)
1	"Forward Motion and Frat Life"	September 22, 2016	0.7/3	3.65	0.3	1.22	1.0	4.87
2	"Secrets and Silent Killers"	September 29, 2016	0.8/3	3.60	—N/a	—N/a	—N/a	—N/a
3	"Eddie and the Empire State of Mind"	October 6, 2016	0.9/3	3.77	—N/a	—N/a	—N/a	—N/a
4	"Boatopsy and Booty"	October 13, 2016	0.8/3	3.51	—N/a	—N/a	—N/a	—N/a
5	"Spirochete and Santeria"	October 27, 2016	0.8/3	3.39	—N/a	—N/a	—N/a	—N/a
6	"Tree Toxins and Three Stories"	November 3, 2016	0.8/3	3.39	—N/a	—N/a	—N/a	—N/a
7	"Lidocaine and Long-Term Lust"	November 10, 2016	0.7/3	3.33	—N/a	—N/a	—N/a	—N/a
8	"Prosopagnosia and Parrot Fish"	November 17, 2016	0.7/3	3.07	—N/a	1.43	—N/a	4.49
9	"Half-Life and Havana Nights"	December 1, 2016	0.7/3	3.11	—N/a	1.53	—N/a	4.64
10	"Bacterium and the Brothers Panitch"	January 6, 2017	0.6/2	3.03	0.4	1.44	1.0	4.47
11	"Mummies and Meltdows"	January 13, 2017	0.7/3	2.86	—N/a	—N/a	—N/a	—N/a
12	"Asphyxiation and Aces"	January 20, 2017	0.6/2	2.87	—N/a	1.25	—N/a	4.12
13	"Puffer Fish and Personal History"	January 27, 2017	0.6/2	2.83	0.4	—N/a	1.0	—N/a
14	"White Matter and the Ways Back"	February 3, 2017	0.6/2	2.61	—N/a	1.23	—N/a	3.84
15	"Clavicle Trauma and Closure"	February 10, 2017	0.7/3	2.91	—N/a	—N/a	—N/a	—N/a
16	"Benzodiazepine and the Benjamins"	February 17, 2017	0.6/2	2.74	—N/a	—N/a	—N/a	—N/a
17	"Radiation and Rough Landings"	February 24, 2017	0.6/2	2.69	—N/a	—N/a	—N/a	—N/a
18	"Fairy Tales and Frozen Truths"	March 31, 2017	0.5/2	2.53	0.4	1.39	0.9	3.91
19	"Naegleria and Neighborhood Watch"	April 7, 2017	0.5/2	2.48	—N/a	1.27	—N/a	3.75
20	"Calliphoridae and Country Roads"	April 14, 2017	0.5/2	2.48	—N/a	1.21	—N/a	3.69
21	"Amparo and the American Dream"	April 21, 2017	0.6/3	2.85	—N/a	1.20	—N/a	3.99
22	"Blistering Heat and Brotherly Love"	April 28, 2017	0.5/2	2.96	TBD	TBD	TBD	TBD

== Home media ==
DVD name	Ep #	Release date
Rosewood: The Complete First Season	22	July 10, 2018
Rosewood: The Complete Second Season	22	July 10, 2018
