= Boys' Life (disambiguation) =

Scout Life, originally Boys' Life, is a magazine published by the Boy Scouts of America since 1911.

Boys' Life, Boy's Life or Boys Life may also refer to:

- A Boy's Life, the working title of the 1982 film E.T. the Extra-Terrestrial

== Film ==
- Boys Life (film), a 1995 compilation of three short subject films
- Boys Life 2, a 1997 compilation of short films
- Boys Life 3, a 2000 compilation of short films
- Boys Life 4: Four Play, a 2003 compilation of short films

== Music ==
- Boys Life (band), a band from Kansas City, Missouri, between 1993–1997
- Boys Life (Boston band), a band from Boston, Massachusetts, between 1980 and 1982

== Literature ==
- Will Rogers, A Boy's Life, a 1937 biography by Harold Keith
- Boy's Life (Japanese magazine), a Japanese-language magazine published from 1963 to 1969 in Japan by Shogakukan
- Boy's Life (play), a 1988 play by Howard Korder
- Boy's Life (novel), a 1991 novel by American author Robert McCammon

== Other uses ==
- Boys' Life Brigade

== See also ==
- Boys of Life, a 1991 novel by Paul Russell
- This Boy's Life: A Memoir, a 1989 book by Tobias Wolff
- This Boy's Life, a 1993 film based on the book directed by Michael Caton-Jones
