= Must Be the Music (film) =

1996 film by Nickolas Perry

- Directed by: Nickolas Perry
- Release date: 1996

Must Be the Music is a 1996 short film written and directed by Nickolas Perry. It features American actor Milo Ventimiglia in his first starring role, playing a gay teenager. The film premiered at the 1996 Sundance Film Festival and was distributed by Strand Releasing as a part of Boys Life 2.

== Cast ==
- Milo Ventimiglia as Jason
- Michael Saucedo as Eric
- Justin Urich as Kevin
- Travis Sher as Dave
- Jason Adelman as Michael
