= Snow Job =

Snow Job may refer to:

- Snowjob, an American colloquialism for a cover-up
- Snow Job (film), a 1971 caper film
- Snow Job (G.I. Joe), a fictional character in the G.I. Joe universe
- Snow Job (TV series), a 1983 Canadian sitcom
- Snow Job, a 2009 novel by William Deverell
- "Snow Job", a song by Bruce Haack on his 1981 album BITE
- "Snow Job", alternative title for the 2003 film Winter Break

== Television episodes ==
- "Snow Job" (6teen), 2006
- "Snow Job" (Alvin and the Chipmunks), 1984
- "Snow Job" (Cheers), 1984
- "Snow Job" (Entourage), 2007
- "Snow Job" (Even Stevens), 2002
