= Maggie Lawson =

American actress (born 1980)

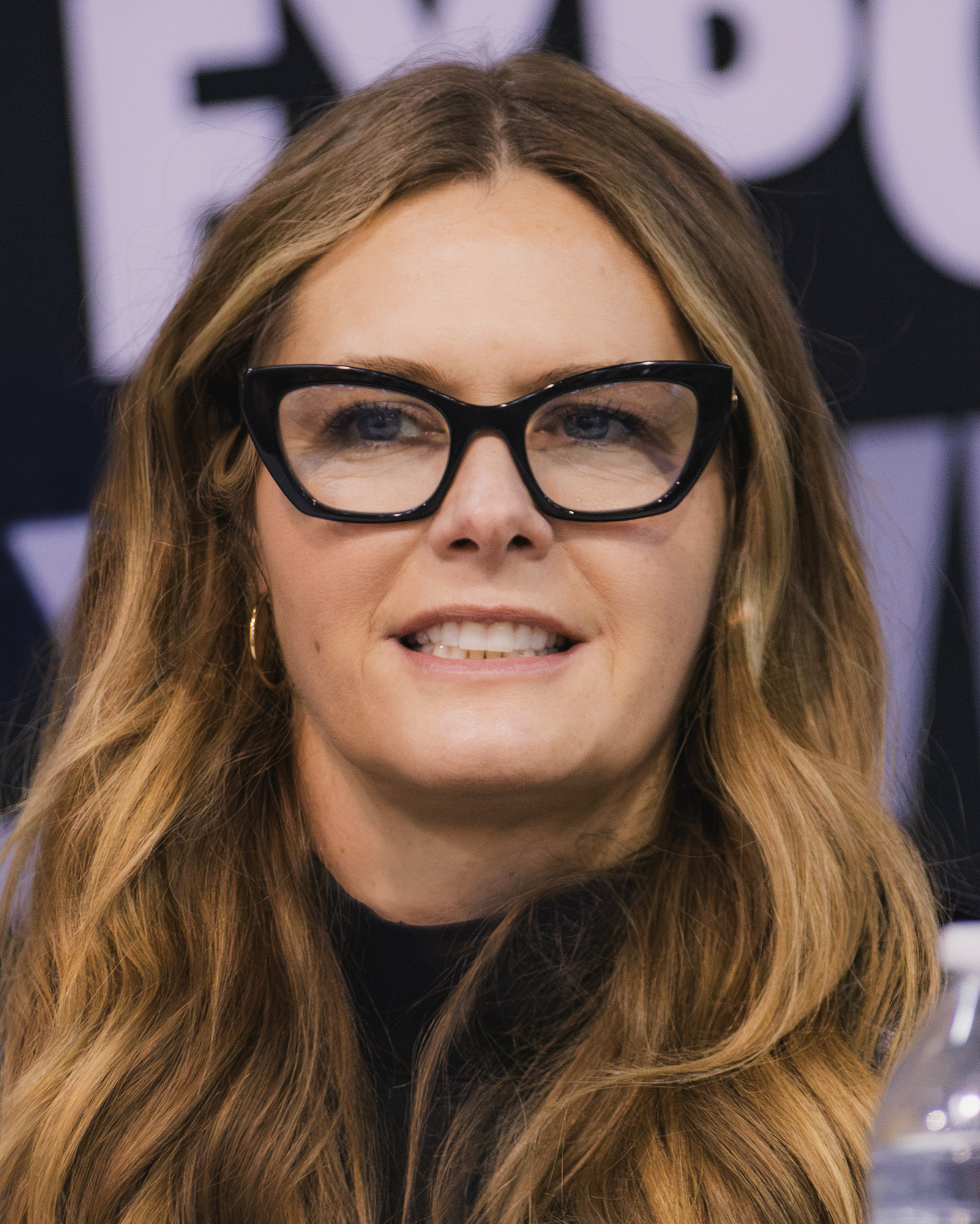
- Lawson in 2026
- Born: Margaret Cassidy Lawson; August 12, 1980 (age 46); Louisville, Kentucky, U.S.
- Occupation: Actress
- Years active: 1996–present
- Spouse: Ben Koldyke (m. 2015; div. 2017)
- Partner: James Roday Rodriguez (2006–2014)

Maggie Lawson (born Margaret Cassidy Lawson on August 12, 1980) is an American actress. Her television roles include Juliet O'Hara in Psych, Natalie Flynn in Lethal Weapon, Kay Bennett in Outmatched, and Sarah Silver in Boston Blue. Her television film credits include Model Behavior, Nancy Drew, and all three installments of the Psych film series.

== Early life, family and education ==
Lawson was born and raised in Louisville, Kentucky. She is the daughter of Mike Lawson, a hotel manager, and Judy Lawson, a homemaker. She began appearing in local community and dinner theatre productions as a child and later worked as a youth journalist for a local Fox television station before moving to Los Angeles.

Lawson attended Assumption High School in Louisville. After moving between Louisville and Los Angeles during high school, she completed her senior year through correspondence and graduated with her class. She also said that she wrote for the school paper while attending Assumption.

== Career ==
Lawson began acting on television as a teenager. Her early television appearances included roles in Hang Time and Boy Meets World. She later appeared in Pleasantville and played dual roles in the television film Model Behavior. In 2002, she portrayed Nancy Drew in a television based on the character.

During the late 1990s and early 2000s, Lawson appeared in television series including Inside Schwartz, It’s All Relative, Crumbs, ER, Party of Five, and Felicity. She also appeared in films and television films including Cheats, Nice Guys Sleep Alone, Cleaner, Killer Hair, and Hostile Makeover.

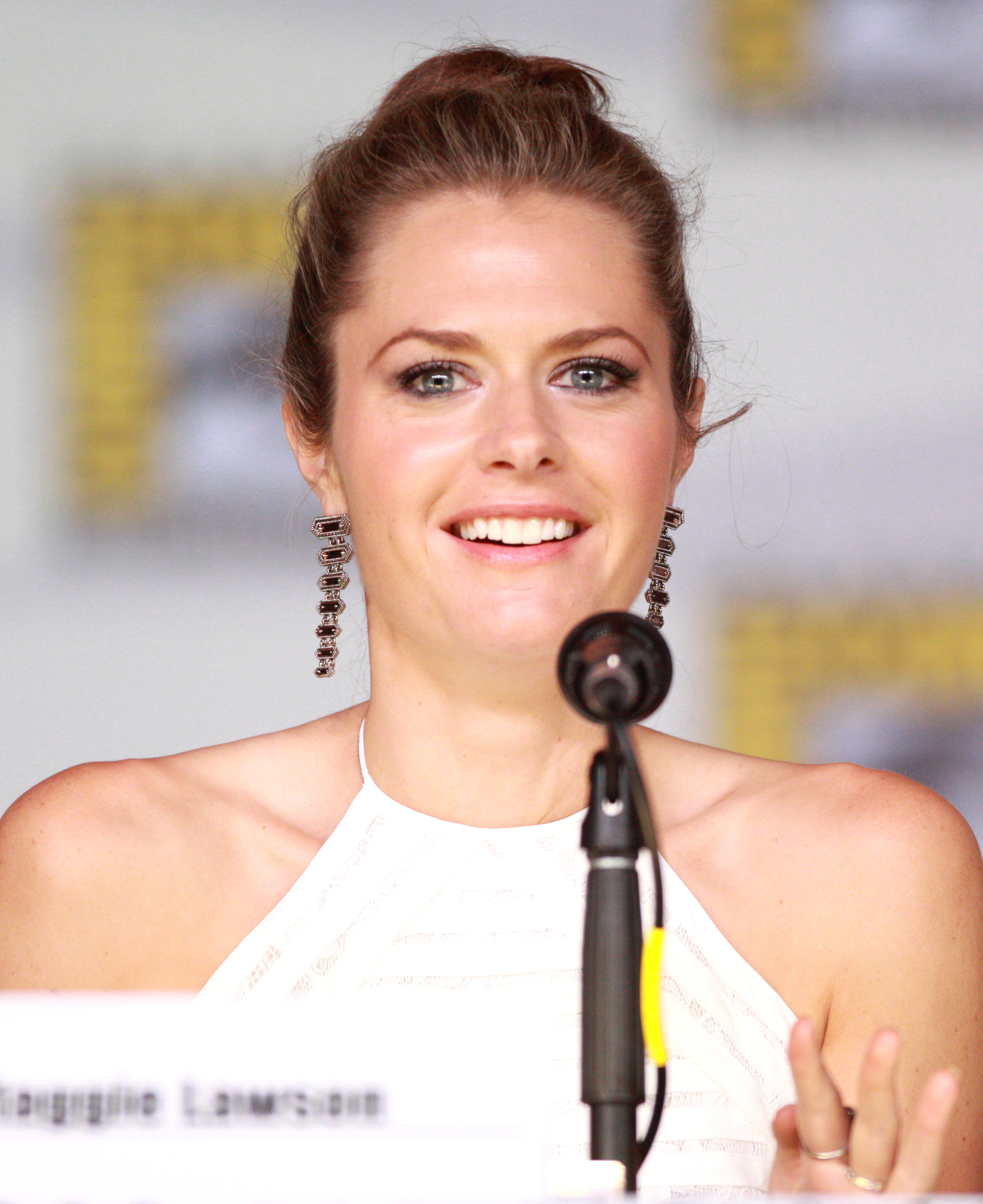
Maggie Lawson at the 2013 San Diego Comic Con

In 2018, Lawson joined the third season of Lethal Weapon as Natalie Flynn, an emergency-room surgeon and former partner of Wesley Cole.

In 2020, Lawson played Kay Bennett in the Fox sitcom Outmatched, opposite Jason Biggs. Fox canceled the series after one season.

In 2024, Lawson played Emily in the Hallmark Channel television film Sugarplummed. The same year, she voiced Jo in the animated series The Milk Chug and was listed as one of the project's executive producers.

In 2025, Lawson portrayed Krista in Lifetime’s I Was a Child Bride: The Courtney Stodden Story. That year, she also joined the CBS series Boston Blue, a Blue Bloods spinoff, as Sarah Silver, the Boston Police Department superintendent.

== Other work ==
Lawson co-hosts The Psychologists Are In with Maggie Lawson and Timothy Omundson, an official Psych rewatch podcast, with Timothy Omundson. The podcast has been active since 2021.

Lawson also hosts Unconditional with Maggie Lawson, a podcast about relationships between people and pets.

Lawson is associated with animal-rescue work. She co-founded the Tiger Frances Foundation and developed Love on Paws, a program involving rescue animals and children. In 2025, The Astra Awards announced that she would receive the Petco Love Lovey Award for her work with animals.

== Personal life ==
Throughout the series run of Psych (2006–2014), Lawson was in a relationship with series lead James Roday Rodriguez.

Lawson married actor Ben Koldyke in 2015 and filed for divorce in 2017.

== Filmography ==
=== Film ===
Year	Title	Role	Notes
1998	I've Been Waiting for You	Debbie Murdock	TV movie
1998	Pleasantville	Lisa Anne	
1999	Nice Guys Sleep Alone	Meghan	
2000	Model Behavior	Alex Burroughs/Janine Adams	TV movie
2002	Cheats	Julie Merkel	
2002	Heart of a Stranger	Amanda Maddox	TV movie
2002	Nancy Drew	Nancy Drew	TV movie
2003	Winter Break	Michelle Casper	
2004	Love Rules!	Kelly	TV movie
2004	Revenge of the Middle-Aged Woman	Rachel	TV movie
2007	Cleaner	Cherie	
2009	Still Waiting...	Allison	Video
2009	Killer Hair	Lacey Smithsonian	TV movie
2009	Hostile Makeover	Lacey Smithsonian	TV movie
2009	Gamer	Female News Host #1	
2010	A Date with Diana	Diana	Short
2017	My Favorite Wedding	Tess Harper	TV movie
2017	Psych: The Movie	Juliet O'Hara	TV movie
2017	Christmas Encore	Charlotte Lacy	TV movie
2018	Spivak	Jeanine Mulholland	TV movie
2019	The Story of Us	Jamie Vaughn	TV movie
2019	Christmas in Evergreen: Tidings of Joy	Katie Connell	TV movie
2020	Psych 2: Lassie Come Home	Juliet O'Hara	TV movie
2021	Psych 3: This Is Gus	Juliet O'Hara	TV movie
2021	A Lot Like Christmas	Jessica Roberts	TV movie
2024	Sugarplummed	Emily Mitchell	TV movie
2025	I Was a Child Bride: The Courtney Stodden Story	Krista	TV movie

=== Television ===
Year	Title	Role	Notes
1996	Hang Time	Kim	Episode: "Green-Eyed Julie"
1996–97	Unhappily Ever After	Madelyn	Recurring Cast: Season 3
1997	Step by Step	Alana Mills	Episode: "Loose Lips"
1997	Cybill	Jennifer	Episode: "Like Family"
1997	Meego	Brooke	Episode: "Fatal Attraction"
1997	Boy Meets World	Debbie	Episode: "I Love You, Donna Karan: Part 1"
1998	Home Improvement	Samantha Hayes	Episode: "An Older Woman"
1998	Kelly Kelly	Ally	Episode: "The Wedding Show"
1999	Working	Julie	Episode: "Romeo and Julie"
1999	Felicity	Rebecca	Episode: "Todd Mulcahy: Part 2"
1999	Family Rules	Hope Harrison	Main Cast
1999	ER	Shannon Mitchell	Episode: "Responsible Parties"
1999	Party of Five	Alexa	Recurring Cast: Season 6
2001–02	Inside Schwartz	Eve Morris	Recurring Cast
2002	Smallville	Chrissy Parker	Episode: "Redux"
2003–04	It's All Relative	Liz Stoddard-Banks	Main Cast
2005	Tru Calling	Megan Roberts	Episode: "The Last Good Day"
2006	Crumbs	Andrea Malone	Main Cast
2006–14	Psych	Juliet O'Hara	Main Cast
2007	Rules of Engagement	Jesse	Episode: "Jeff's Wooby"
2008	Fear Itself	Samantha the Bride	Episode: "In Sickness and in Health"
2012	Justified	Layla	Episode: "Thick as Mud"
2013–14	Back in the Game	Terry Gannon Jr.	Main Cast
2014–15	Two and a Half Men	Ms. McMartin	Recurring Cast: Season 12
2016	Angel from Hell	Allison	Main Cast
2017	The Great Indoors	Rachel	Recurring Cast
2017–18	The Ranch	Jen	Recurring Cast: Season 2, Guest: Season 3
2018–19	Lethal Weapon	Natalie Flynn	Recurring Cast: Season 3
2018–19	Santa Clarita Diet	Christa	Recurring Cast: Season 2–3
2019	Into the Dark	Rebecca Wheeler	Episode: "Treehouse"
2020	Outmatched	Kay	Main Cast
2023–25	The Milk Chug	Jo (voice)	Main Cast
2025-current	Boston Blue	Sarah Silver	Main Cast
