= It's All Relative =

American television sitcom (2003–2004)

- Genre: Sitcom
- Created by: Anne Flett-Giordano; Chuck Ranberg
- Starring: Lenny Clarke; Harriet Sansom Harris; Reid Scott; Maggie Lawson; Christopher Sieber; John Benjamin Hickey; Paige Moss
- Composers: Jonathan Wolff; Bruce Miller
- Country of origin: United States
- Original language: English
- No. of seasons: 1
- No. of episodes: 22 (2 unaired)

Production
- Executive producers: Anne Flett-Giordano; Chuck Ranberg; Craig Zadan; Neil Meron
- Producers: Josh Bycel; Jonathan Fener
- Cinematography: Jerry Workman
- Camera setup: Multi-camera
- Running time: 19—22 minutes
- Production companies: Storyline Entertainment; Naturally Blond Productions; Touchstone Television; Paramount Network Television

Original release
- Network: ABC
- Release: October 1, 2003 – April 6, 2004

It's All Relative is an American sitcom that aired on ABC from October 1, 2003, until April 6, 2004. The series is about two families in Boston – one lower-class Irish Catholic and the other an upper-class WASP household headed by a gay couple – who are reluctantly joined together when their kids get engaged. Created by Chuck Ranberg and Anne Flett-Giordano, the show ran for a single season of 22 episodes, two of which were unaired. It received negative reviews from critics.

== Overview ==
The story revolved around two polar opposite families, who lived in Boston, Massachusetts, that are forced to come together with their kids' engagement.

In one corner, there was the working-class O'Neill family, led by Mace (Lenny Clarke), the rather stereotypical Boston Irish bar owner of Paddy's, with his wife, traditional middle-aged housewife Audrey (Harriet Sansom Harris), and two kids, Bobby (Reid Scott) and Maddy (Paige Moss).

On the other side, there was the upper-class Stoddard-Banks family, with Simon (Christopher Sieber) and Philip (John Benjamin Hickey), a same-sex couple who takes pride in how well they were able to raise their adoptive daughter, Liz (Maggie Lawson).

These two polar opposite families collide when it is revealed Bobby and Liz have been secretly dating each other, and are now engaged. Both sides are against any relationship their child has with the other, let alone a marriage. Homophobic Mace and Stuck-up Philip especially drive the arguments between both of the families, with their very vocal disapproval of not only the engagement, but each other. Bobby and Liz move into Simon and Philip's guest house, and the families are now forced to come together – whether they like it or not.

The series follows the relationship between two people from two completely different worlds, and how they make their relationship work. During this process, the two families strove to come to terms with the inevitability of being "joined" by their children's union, which would force both sides to revisit their preconceptions and prejudices.

== Production ==
The show was created by Chuck Ranberg and Anne Flett-Giordano. In January 2003, the project received a pilot order at ABC, albeit untitled. Reid Scott was the first cast on March 5, 2003. The next day, Maggie Lawson was cast, shortly following her leading role on the ABC pilot Nancy Drew. John Benjamin Hickey was cast on March 21, 2003. On March 31, 2003, Christopher Sieber was cast; Sieber had previously starred in another ABC sitcom Two of a Kind. Lenny Clarke was cast on April 9, 2003.

The pilot was picked up by ABC on May 12, 2003, now with the title It's All Relative. The series premiered on ABC on October 1, 2003. The pilot earned a total of 10.2 million viewers. The series was picked up for a full 22-episode season on October 31, 2003.

Despite initial high ratings, and airing between My Wife and Kids and The Bachelor, the series' ratings soon slid, especially as it had to compete against 60 Minutes Wednesday and American Idol on Wednesdays. In February 2004, ABC put the series on hiatus, before a move to Tuesdays in March 2004. The rescheduling worsened ratings, now competing against more established and popular series: established Top 50 series 24, The Guardian and Scrubs, and critical favorites America's Next Top Model and One Tree Hill. After two episodes in the new timeslot, the series was abruptly pulled from ABC's schedule on April 8, 2004, with the final two scheduled episodes left unaired. On May 17, 2004, ABC announced at their annual upfronts that it had cancelled It's All Relative.

For the 2003–04 television season, the series placed #57 overall, with an average of 8.6 million viewers.

== Cast and characters ==
=== Main ===
- Reid Scott as Bobby O'Neill:

The son of Mace and Audrey, and Liz' fiancée. Bobby may not be the brightest or the most hard-working, but he still loves Liz, and is willing to overlook their vast differences to be with her. Bobby works at his family's bar. He and Liz met at a Vermont ski resort, after she sprained her ankle on a "bunny slope", and he took her back to the lodge. When he and Liz announce their engagement, they move into Philip and Simon's guest house.

- Maggie Lawson as Liz Stoddard-Banks:

The adoptive daughter of Philip and Simon, and Bobby's fiancée. Liz is a smart, outgoing, somewhat-spoiled but well-meaning, Harvard student. Her mother died when Liz was still a baby, and Philip and Simon – her best friends – adopted and raised Liz. Despite being adopted, Liz has much in common with both her dads- she has Philip's need for organization and order, but Simon's need to relax and have fun (although it usually involves things most would not find fun). Liz met Bobby when she sprained her ankle on a bunny slope at a Vermont skiing lodge. She was raised Episcopalian.

- Lenny Clarke as Mason "Mace" O'Neill:

Bobby's Irish Catholic father and Audrey's husband, as well as the owner of the family bar. Mace is a typical Irish Catholic patriarch: he frequently drinks beer, won't change his viewpoint or choices for others, and wants his son to marry a Catholic girl. Mace and Philip both disapprove of Bobby and Liz' relationship, and hate each other as well. Mace will frequently call Philip and Simon various demeaning names, such as "Pixie Sticks" or "The Notorious G.A.Y.". In the first part of the series, Mace is extremely homophobic; however, these tendencies were suppressed as the show went on (although he does still continue to call them names). When Mace does not get his way, he usually yells "Fine!" and walks away. He is similar to Archie Bunker in all in the family.

- Harriet Sansom Harris as Audrey O'Neill (née Corrigan):

Bobby's mother and Mace's wife, who helps him run the bar. Audrey only wants the best for Bobby and Maddy, and her desires and decisions usually conflict with Mace's. Although Audrey is at first on the same page with Mace regarding the Stoddard-Banks family, she eventually warms up to Simon. Later episodes also show Audrey gaining more confidence in herself and her beliefs and desires. She is usually similar to Edith Bunker from All in the family.

- John Benjamin Hickey as Philip Stoddard:

Liz's adoptive father, who serves as the patriarch of the Stoddard-Banks family. Philip is portrayed as an effeminate, OCD-ridden art gallery owner. Philip has several phobias and ticks that usually annoy the others (especially Mace and Simon), such as: having different napkins for spills and eating, not allowing Liz and Simon to get dogs due to their "filthiness" (even going as far as lying to both of them for many years about having a terrible allergy), etc. Like Mace disapproves of the relationship between Bobby and Liz, Philip is also the more vocal one of the couple of his disapproval; he is usually saying insults (and sometimes trying) to get Bobby and Liz broken-up. A running gag on the series is Philip's three-times divorced mother, Lillian, an overbearing woman who causes both Philip and Simon grief, and is on her fourth marriage to a millionaire in Florida.

- Christopher Sieber as Simon Banks:

Liz' adoptive father, who serves as the matriarch of the Stoddard-Banks family. Simon is a third-grade teacher, who is portrayed as more masculine than Philip, although he usually takes care of more of the household chores, such as cooking. However, Philip is also very much more laid-back than Philip. Like Audrey, Simon is also on the same page as Philip when Bobby and Liz reveal their engagement; however, he eventually warms up to Audrey. Simon was born and raised in Minnesota, and was in a one-hit 1980's boy band called "Cross My Heart" (as "Simon Sez"). A running gag in the series are mentions to Simon's "wild" past and string of exes.

- Paige Moss as Maddy O'Neill:

Bobby's younger sister, who is a waitress at the bar. Maddy is a sassy, ditsy, promiscuous gold-digger, who is the most open-minded about Liz and her family (although she does find Liz too boring). Maddy frequently says ignorant comments, such as "Man, daddy, if you would've been gay, my life would have been so much better." Her dimness is usually made fun of by the other characters, especially Bobby and Mace. Maddy has hooked up with many guys, but is usually only interested in pursuing a relationship with rich men (but only for their money). She was held back in the third grade.

=== Notable guest stars ===
- Victor Garber as Joffrey (episode: "The Doctor Is Out")
- James Patrick Stuart as Charlie Carson (episode: "Swangate")
- Olympia Dukakis as Colleen O'Neill, Mace's mother (episode: "Thanks, But No Thanks")
- Ed McMahon as himself (episode: "And Our Sauce, It Is a Beauty")
- Ed Quinn as Brad, Simon's bandmate and ex-boyfriend (episode: "Cross My Heart")
- Kevin Chamberlin as Wayne, Simon's bandmate (episode: "Cross My Heart")
- Brooke Burke-Charvet as Park Ranger (episode: "Who's Camping Now")
- Darby Stanchfield as Jordan F., one of Liz' friends who Maddy fights with (episode: "Who's Camping Now")
- Andy Richter as Dr. Bob, a TV psychologist who Audrey likes (episode: "Philip in a China Shop")
- Stephen Tobolowsky as Roy, a fellow fan of Dr. Bob (episode: "Philip in a China Shop")
- Marisa Miller as herself (episode: "Philip in a China Shop")
- Tom Bosley as Father Joseph, the priest at the O'Neill's parish (episode: "Fight for Your Invite to Party")

== Episodes ==
No.	Title	Directed by	Written by	Original release date	Prod. code	Viewers (millions)
1	"Pilot"	Andy Cadiff	Anne Flett-Giordano & Chuck Ranberg	October 1, 2003	101	10.79
Liz and Bobby are recently engaged, after months of sneaking around in a secret relationship. When the two finally tell their parents (Bobby's lower-class Irish Catholic parents and sister; Liz's adoptive fathers, an upper-class gay couple), they are not amused. A fight at their first meeting results in Bobby being kicked out of the house, and both him and Liz moving into her fathers' guest house when they threaten to elope.
2	"Truth and Consequences"	Steve Zuckerman	Barton Dean	October 8, 2003	103	10.19
Liz has found out Bobby is the "King of Break-ups", and gets upset at him. Liz forces Bobby to apologize to all his ex-girlfriends, but this backfires when one of them tries to break them up and get back together with him. Meanwhile, Audrey wants to go to an Amish quilt festival, but Mace refuses to take her.
3	"Hell's Kitchen"	Fred Savage	Ken Levine & David Isaacs	October 15, 2003	102	10.17
Bobby accidentally breaks the coffee breaker, and everyone gets roped into helping him cover it up from Philip. Meanwhile, Maddy falls for Liz's study partner, who is Indian.
4	"Take Me Out"	Steve Zuckerman	Jonathan Fener & Josh Bycel	October 22, 2003	104	9.94
Liz and Bobby encourage the two families to bond: Simon and Philip reluctantly go to a Red Sox game with Bobby and Mace, while Liz goes with Audrey and Maddy to a basement sale. However, both days end disastrously with Bobby getting hit with a baseball, and Liz getting her, Audrey, and Maddy banned from the store.
5	"The Doctor Is Out"	Ken Levine	Ellen Byron & Lissa Kapstrom	October 29, 2003	105	9.43
When Mace's hernia is acting up, he refuses to go to a doctor Simon and Philip know, based on the fact he's gay. A concerned Audrey decides to trick him into going, which proves to be disastrous when he bumps into him at Simon and Philip's annual Halloween party. Meanwhile, Maddy and Liz help each other with their Halloween costumes for Philip and Simon's party, so Liz can show she has a "dark side".
6	"Waking Uncle Paddy"	Barnet Kellman	Barton Dean	November 5, 2003	107	8.57
Audrey's Uncle Paddy dies of heart attack while watching television (they found out because he was watching The View), and Bobby invites Liz to go along to the funeral, much to the disappointment of Mace. However, she ends up embarrassing herself, and also gets the family in trouble when accidentally ruining his wake. Meanwhile, Mace tries to get Paddy's $650 tab, while Philip and Simon run the bar, and unexpectedly become popular with the regular patrons.
7	"Swangate"	Barnet Kellman	Josh Bycel & Jonathan Fener	November 12, 2003	108	10.33
For once, both the O'Neills and Stoddard-Banks agree on something — a political candidate, Charlie Carson, who is campaigning for a revival of the older neighborhoods and gay marriage. However, this common interest falls apart when the parents find out he has killed a locally-famous swan, and he asks them to help him cover it up. Meanwhile, Liz uses the bar to do her science project, which drives away customers, and makes Bobby mad at her.
8	"Road Trippin'"	Barnet Kellman	Lissa Kapstrom & Ellen Byron	November 19, 2003	110	10.21
For the three-month anniversary of their engagement, Liz and Bobby trick their parents into throwing them an engagement party. However, their arguing causes Liz and Bobby to run off to Vermont, to the ski lodge they met at. Due to misinformation from Maddy, the parents think they are eloping, and go to top them. Meanwhile, Liz and Bobby get stuck at a run-down lodge with the creepy manager (and the same one the parents eventually also get stuck at), and Maddy tries to persuade Mace into letting her new band, Jail Bait, perform at the bar; when she is left in charge, their performance drives away customers.
9	"Thanks, But No Thanks"	Barnet Kellman	Anne Flett-Giordano & Chuck Ranberg	November 26, 2003	109	8.53
Mace's mother, Colleen, does a surprise Thanksgiving visit, much to everyone's annoyance. Due to her perceived homophobia, Mace and Audrey try to hide Simon and Philip from them – made all the more difficult by Liz's invitation to their Thanksgiving dinner. In the end, she surprises everyone when she accepts the Stoddard-Banks family, and Bobby and Liz's relationship — while saying the wedding "is never going to happen".
10	"Artistic Differences"	Andy Cadiff	Jordan Hawley & Wil Schifrin	December 10, 2003	106	9.37
Everybody thinks Audrey's new painting is hideous, especially Philip. But when he sees an article in The New York Times about how the type of Audrey's painting is coming back into style, he feigns a sudden change of heart buys it from Mace, leading to Simon and Liz accusing him of being a poser. When she returns from picking up Maddy in Atlantic city (after she blew her money at a casino, while she was supposed to be looking at beautician school), Audrey is furious that Mace sold it. When Philip gets guilty over buying the painting, he sells the painting in his gallery to a blind man, who he and Mace have to get it back from — only for her to demand Philip to sell it again. Meanwhile, Bobby and Liz fight over habits and possessions the other doesn't like.
11	"The Santa That Came to Dinner"	Ken Levine	Ken Levine & David Isaacs	December 17, 2003	111	8.20
The O'Neills and Stoddard-Bankses are spending Christmas apart, much to the relief of the parents. However, while bringing Philip and Simon a new Christmas tree, Mace dislocates his back, and they are forced to spend Christmas together with their different traditions. And complicating the holiday is everybody giving Mace muscle relaxers. Meanwhile, Bobby struggles to find the perfect present for Liz that nobody else has bought her. Ironically, they end up buying the same gifts for each other.
12	"What's Up"	Philip Charles MacKenzie	Anne Flett-Giordano & Chuck Ranberg	January 7, 2004	112	8.70
When Bobby learns Liz expects to support them financially in their marriage, he becomes insecure to the point the couple begins having issues in the bedroom. The stress puts them on the edge of calling off the engagement, making both Mace and Philip openly thrilled. But as Bobby and Liz become miserable and depressed, Audrey and Simon decide to get them back together behind the backs of their significant others, with Simon talking to Bobby about his issues and helping him come to terms about it.
13	"And Our Sauce, It Is a Beauty"	Bob Koherr	Phill Lewis	January 14, 2004	116	7.76
Philip is irritated that his buyers are awed and more interested in Mace watching television and eating junk food. However, he decides to take advantage of their interest.
14	"Ready, Aim, Sing!"	Barnet Kellman	Michael Markowitz	January 21, 2004	114	6.19
Simon is putting on a play for gun control, that is quickly spiraling out of control. When the lead actress in injured, sewing lady Audrey takes the leading role, much to Mace's horror, and bringing up a debate about gun control — Audrey and the Stoddard-Bankses support gun control, while the rest of the O'Neill's are against it. Meanwhile, Philip is irritated he is not a part of the play, but ends up playing gopher for Simon.
15	"Tackleboxxx/The Love Below"	Philip Charles MacKenzie	Michael Markowitz	January 28, 2004	113	6.65
Simon comes to the bar with his new teaching assistant, Lance, who Maddy develops an attraction to. Simon tries to set them up by having her help out in the class' project, but Philip — who is against Simon's matchmaking due to all the relationships ending in disaster — unexpectedly shows up and tries to stop Simon's matchmaking. Meanwhile, Mace's old friend is in town, and they compete to see who is more masculine — much to the dismay of Audrey.
16	"Cross My Heart"	Ken Levine	Jayme Petrille	February 11, 2004	117	6.68
It's Valentine's Day, and just as Simon's Where Are They Now? special about his ill-fated 80's boy band episode is about to air, Mace decides to run for President of the Merchant's Association. To win, Mace convinces Simon's band to have a reunion, which turns out to be disastrous – especially with the arrival of Simon's ex-boyfriend that he kept from Philip. Meanwhile, Bobby tries to find a more romantic plan for Liz than his usual Valentine's day routine, while Audrey and Philip are angry that their significant others are more concerned with the election and reunion than Valentine's Day.
17	"A Long Day's Journey Into Leonard's"	Barnet Kellman	Charlie Hauck	February 18, 2004	115	7.02
Maddy blabs to the parish priest that Bobby and Liz have slept together, and the parents call for the wedding to happen as soon as possible. While looking into a popular reception hall, Bobby gets nervous about marriage and Maddy crashes a wedding. Meanwhile, Philip uses Mace to get into the "O'Neill's club", since Mace is a great-nephew of Philip's idol, Eugene O'Neill.
18	"Oscar Interruptus"	Steve Zuckerman	Ellen Byron & Lissa Kapstrom	February 25, 2004	118	7.72
An argument between Philip and Mace causes them to break the television set, and miss both a big game and the Oscars ceremony. While trying to repair the television, they end up gluing themselves together, and going to the hospital. Meanwhile, Maddy teaches Audrey what a "free pass" is, and she annoys the others with her and Simon's frequent gossip about it.
19	"Who's Camping Now"	Bob Koherr	Josh Bycel & Jonathan Fener	March 30, 2004	121	8.57
Liz and Bobby are having their Bachelor and Bachelorette parties, and force the other to invite their family. Mace and Bobby take Simon and Philip on the O'Neill's annual bachelor party camping trip, and make a bet about if Simon and Philip can survive; eventually, Mace cheats with the guys by ditching Simon and Philip to join the guys at a cabin, and Simon and Philip win the bet while also pranking them by making them look for them all night. Meanwhile, Liz invites Audrey and Maddy to come to her boring Bachelorette party with all her rich friends, but Maddy invites a stripper to give them stripping lessons that intimidate Liz.
20	"Philip in a China Shop"	Barnet Kellman	Barton Dean & Josh Bycel & Jonathan Fener	April 6, 2004	122	6.90
While going to register for Liz and Bobby's wedding, Philip has a panic attack, and refuses to come off a display. Audrey and Maddy fight in line for a popular daytime TV therapist. Bobby gets mad at Liz when she becomes frustrated with him and sends him to he store's "man cave". Simon and Mace put together a crib for the baby shower of one of Philip and Simon's friends, with little success.
21	"Doggy Style"	Leonard R. Garner Jr.	Barton Dean	Unaired	119	N/A
When Liz and Simon find a stray dog, they are upset that they can't keep the dog due to Philip's dog allergy. However, they find out that Philip has been faking the allergy, because he actually hates dogs. The topic then turns to child rearing, which presents flashbacks, and puts the families – including Liz and Bobby – at odds for how to raise kids.
22	"Fight For Your Invite to Party"	Barton Dean	Lissa Kapstrom & Ellen Byron & Michael Markowitz	Unaired	120	N/A
Liz is over stressed with wedding planning and finals, which causes her to make a bad impression with the priest at Bobby's church, and have him cancel the wedding. Meanwhile, the parents argue over the wedding invitations, and Maddy tries to have some fun by acting as messenger for both sides.

== Reception ==
=== Critical ===
The series received negative reviews from critics.

=== Ratings ===
Season	Episodes	Timeslot (EDT)	Season premiere	Season finale	TV season	Rank	Viewers (in millions)
1	22 (2 unaired)	Wednesday 8:30 PM (1–18); Tuesday 9:30 PM (19–20)	October 1, 2003	April 6, 2004	2003–04	57	8.60
