= Nickolas Perry =

American film director

- Born: December 3, 1967
- Occupations: film director, writer, editor, photographer

Nickolas Perry (born December 3, 1967) is an American film director, writer, editor, photographer, and film instructor who began his career working as a camera assistant and assistant director on independent films in San Francisco before becoming Francis Ford Coppola's editing assistant on Bram Stoker's Dracula.

In 1995, Perry wrote and directed Must Be the Music, a short film starring Milo Ventimiglia and Michael Saucedo as gay teens on a Friday night out in Los Angeles. The film premiered at the 1996 Sundance Film Festival and was later distributed as part of Strand Releasing's Boys Life 2. The film got the attention of director Gus Van Sant, who would executively produce Perry's first feature film, Speedway Junky.

Perry wrote and directed Speedway Junky in 1999. The film premiered at the Berlin International Film Festival and starred Daryl Hannah, Jesse Bradford, and Jonathan Taylor Thomas. In 2004, Perry co-wrote, co-directed, and edited The Hunting of the President, an American documentary film based on the New York Times best-selling novel, The Hunting of the President: The Ten Year Campaign to Destroy Bill and Hillary Clinton, written by investigative journalists Joe Conason and Gene Lyons, and published by Thomas Dunne Books in 2000. Narrated by Morgan Freeman, the film premiered at the 2004 Sundance Film Festival and was distributed theatrically by 20th Century Fox. With Harry Thomason, Perry was nominated for the Writers Guild of America Award for Best Documentary Screenplay for the film.

Perry is a member of the Directors Guild of America and a member of the Non-Fiction Writers Caucus at the Writers Guild of America. He works as a script doctor and as a consultant on low-budget features and documentaries, advising first-time directors on independent film completion, distribution, and marketing.

== Select filmography ==
- Metaphysia 2012 (2010) (editor)
- The Hunting of the President (2004) (co-writer, co-director, editor)
- Speedway Junky (1999) (writer, director)
- The Creed (1998) (director)
- Boys Life 2 (1997) (writer, director, segment "Must Be the Music")
- Must Be the Music (1996) (writer, director)
