= Rip-Off (band) =

American band

Rip-Off was an American band from Boston active between 1987 and 1989. The group was founded by Robert and Mary Feuer, with Robert on guitar and Mary on bass. Additional members were Steve Melanson and Timmy Biggins.

== History ==
Rip-Off
- Origin: Boston, Massachusetts
- Genres: Post Punk, Alternative Rock
- Years active: 1987-1990
- Label: Richard Feuer/Executive Producer
- Past members: Robert Feuer; Mary Feuer; Steve Melanson; Timmy Biggins

=== Background ===
Robert Feuer moved from Rockland County, New York, to Boston after graduating from Ramapo High School in 1983. He attended Northeastern University for one year before leaving school and working in various restaurants.

In 1985, while working as a line cook at a restaurant, he met Chris George, then the bass player for the band Boys Life. The two quickly became friends and formed an avant-garde project called Three Day Xmas. That collaboration eventually led to the creation of Drumming on Glass. However, Robert and Chris ultimately parted ways due to musical differences.

=== Ticketron ===
Ticketron was the pioneer of computerized ticketing. Many people still have fond memories of waiting in line—sometimes overnight—outside of Sears to snag tickets for popular events. The company is remembered for charging customers only a few dollars to process tickets, which were mostly sold by phone. Eventually, Ticketmaster acquired Ticketron, marking the end of low service fees.

The office served as a regional branch for New England and upstate New York, situated just half a block from the old Boston Garden. Ticketron hired a lot musicians from the local underground scene, as the flexible hours allowed them to earn money while maintaining their band schedules.

Notable Boston bands with members who worked there include: The Mighty Mighty BossTones, Scruffy the Cat, Last Stand, and Salem 66. In addition, Randi Millman, who managed bands and is currently a DJ at WUMB, worked customer service during this time period.

Robert was still playing with Drumming on Glass when he joined Ticketron, moving on from his job as a line cook at high-end restaurants in town. It was there that he first noticed the assistant manager of the office Mary Biggins, and the two soon began dating.

=== The Band Forms ===
In 1986, Robert and Mary began collaborating with a rotating cast of musicians, eventually solidifying their lineup as a quartet, with both sharing songwriting and vocal duties. As a new bassist, Mary quickly helped shape the band's distinctive sound. The band's main influences were X-Ray Specs and X.

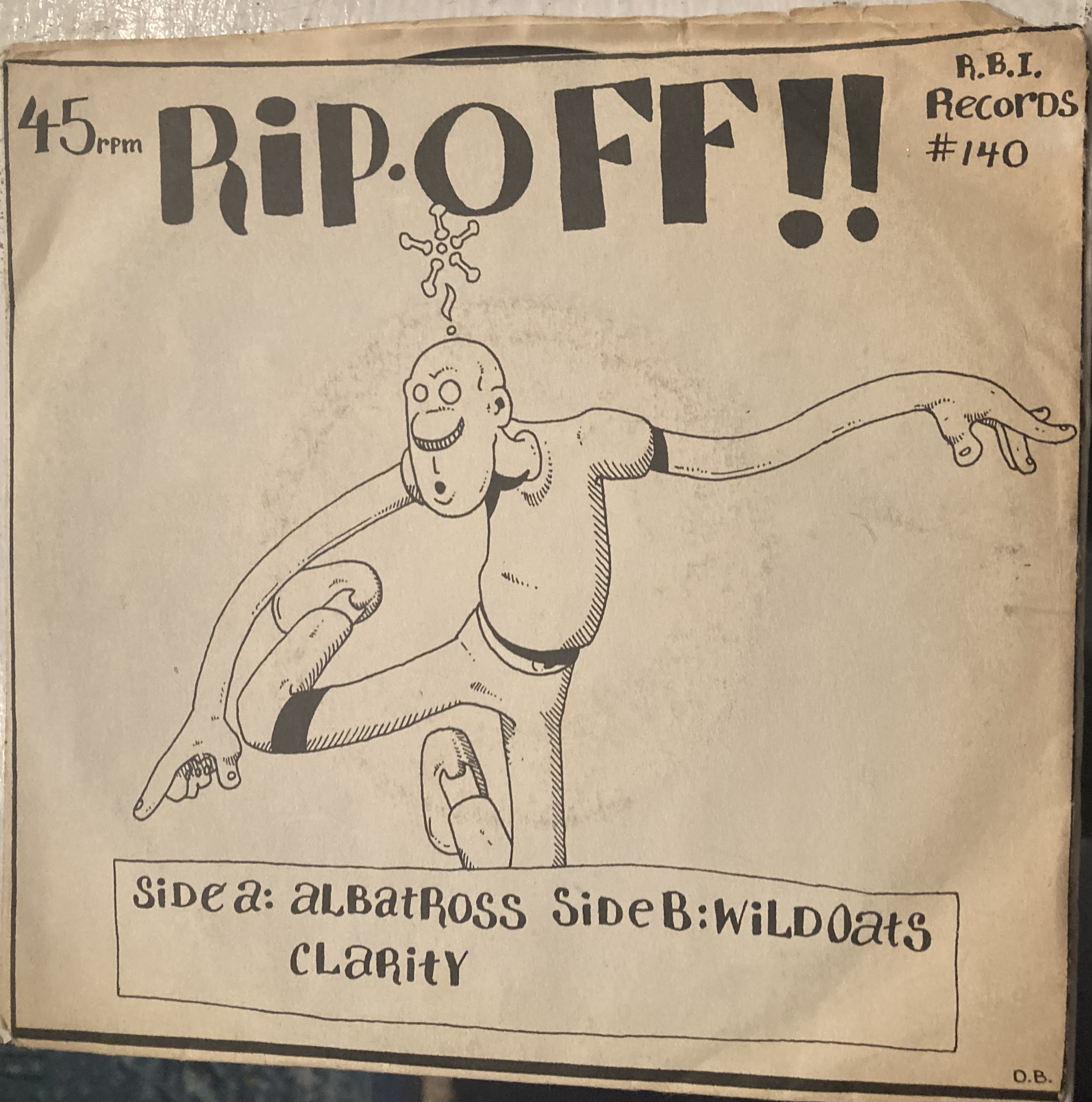

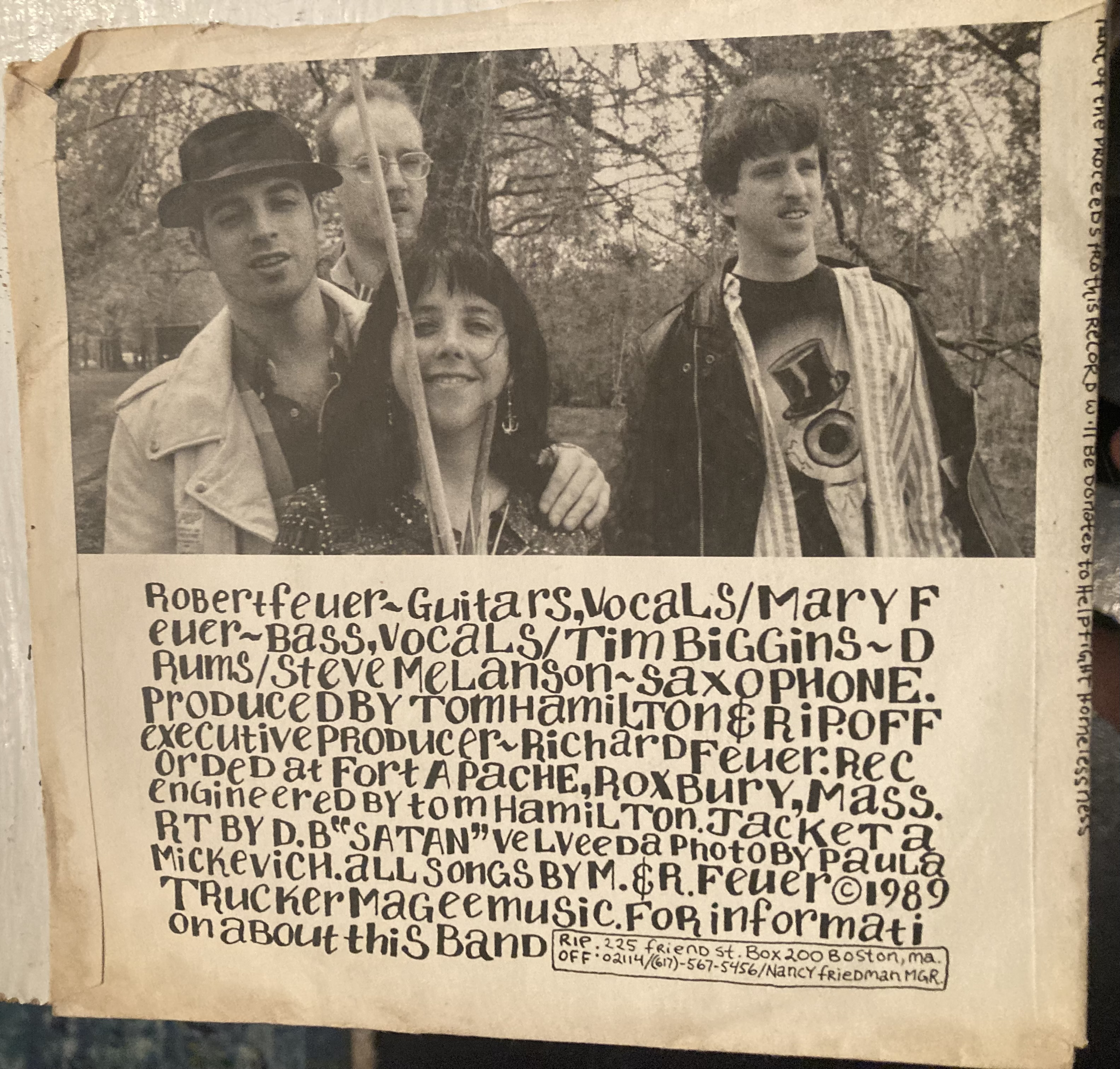

Mary's brother, Timmy Biggins, and his high school friend, Steve Melanson, had been playing together for years in an experimental group called Eros in Bondage. After contributing to several of Robert and Mary's early projects, they became the rhythmic and melodic backbone of the band when Rip-Off was formed.

=== After Rip-Off ===
Robert Feuer and Robert Wilson-Rodriguez first met at Chris George's apartment on Newbury Street in Boston. At the time, Wilson—the guitar player for Salem 66—was looking for a place to stay between tours. He eventually left that group for a brief stint with Drumming on Glass. In1991, Feuer would return to New York.

It was there that Wilson-Rodriguez taught Feuer the art of subway busking, sparking a musical partnership that spanned years under various monikers. Life eventually took them to Albuquerque, New Mexico; a year after arriving, Feuer was struck by a drunk driver, requiring a month-long hospital recovery. Their collaboration culminated in 2005 with a 14-song album recorded under the name The Shut-inz. Today, Feuer works as a special education teacher for Albuquerque Public Schools, while Wilson-Rodriguez continues to write and record music.

Mary Feuer moved to Los Angeles in 2004, establishing a diverse career as a writer, director, and producer. Her professional portfolio includes work on television pilots, feature films, and landmark web series like Lonelygirl15 and With the Angels. She remains active in the industry today, producing and sharing original creative works through her own YouTube channel and digital platforms.
