= Speedway Junky =

1999 film by Nickolas Perry

- Promotional poster
- Directed by: Nickolas Perry
- Written by: Nickolas Perry
- Produced by: Randall Emmett; George Furla; Rodney Omanoff; Jeff Rice; Noel Ashman
- Starring: Jesse Bradford; Jordan Brower; Jonathan Taylor Thomas; Daryl Hannah
- Edited by: Craig A. Colton
- Music by: Stan Ridgway
- Distributed by: Regent Entertainment
- Release date: February 11, 1999
- Running time: 105 minutes
- Country: United States
- Language: English
- Budget: $1,000,000

Speedway Junky is a 1999 American crime drama film written and directed by Nickolas Perry and starring Jesse Bradford, Jordan Brower, Jonathan Taylor Thomas and Daryl Hannah.

== Plot ==
The film stars Jesse Bradford as Johnny, a young man with dreams of becoming a stock car racer. After he loses all of his money and possessions in Las Vegas, he drifts into the world of hustling, in the hope of making enough money to travel to Charlotte, North Carolina to join the car racing industry. He meets Eric (Jordan Brower), a gay hustler, who finds himself falling for Johnny. Jonathan Taylor Thomas also stars as Steve, a bisexual hustler, and Daryl Hannah plays Veronica, a former showgirl and prostitute who has served as a surrogate mother figure for Eric since his own mother died. Other than Veronica, the only thing Eric has to remind him of his mother is a silver dollar she gave him that he carries for good luck.

Eric falls deeply in love with Johnny, and is saddened that his love will remain unrequited. Eric finds out that Johnny is a virgin and really wants to have sex with a woman, so Eric asks Veronica to have sex with Johnny. Under the guidance of Eric and with tips from Steve, Johnny slowly becomes a good hustler. Steve then asks Johnny to join him in entertaining some gay clients for a potentially large payment. Johnny refuses because it is Eric's birthday, much to the annoyance of Steve, who really needs the money from the clients who will only pay if both Steve and Johnny arrive. When Eric remains sombre, Johnny questions him, they argue, and Eric finally confesses his love for Johnny. Johnny tells Eric that he really cares for Eric too because Eric has been the best friend that he has ever had, and asks Eric to move with him to Charlotte. Delighted to find out that Johnny really cares for him, Eric agrees.

J.T., a sociopathic drug dealer, tosses Johnny a package while running from the police. It contains crack cocaine and cash. Steve finds it in their place and steals it. When J.T. shows up looking for it, it's missing. J.T. holds Johnny hostage while Eric looks for Steve. Steve refuses to return the cash and the drugs, so Eric heads to Veronica's place. There he steals the gun belonging to her police officer boyfriend and heads home. J.T. is playing William Tell with Johnny, shooting a can of tomato soup off his head. Eric comes in and thinks Johnny's been shot. He gets into a gun battle with J.T., killing him. Johnny and Eric flee but Eric realizes he's been shot. Eric dies in Johnny's arms, giving Johnny his lucky silver dollar. At the bus station, Johnny puts the dollar in a slot machine and hits a jackpot. He buys a bus ticket and leaves town.

A year later, Veronica is working as a cocktail waitress. She glances up at a television and sees Johnny. He's a member of a pit crew, having taken a step toward realizing his dream.

== Cast ==
- Jesse Bradford as Johnny
- Jordan Brower as Eric
- Jonathan Taylor Thomas as Steve
- Daryl Hannah as Veronica
- Tiffani Thiessen as Wilma Price
- Patsy Kensit as Donna
- Justin Urich as Scooby
- Adrienne Frantz as Kelley
- Patrick Renna as Bud
- Erik Alexander Gavica as Jason "J.T." Torres
- Timothy McNeil as Russel
- Warren G as Brentley Shaw
- Milo Ventimiglia as Travis
- Richard Balin as Ticket Man
- Jaime Bergman as Bombshell #1

== Production ==
Speedway Junky was filmed in 1998 and screened at indie festivals. However, it did not get a theatrical release until 2001 due to struggles with finding a distributor.
