= Jordan Brower =

American actor (born 1981)

- Born: Jordan Lloyd Brower; October 14, 1981 (age 44); Lompoc, California, United States
- Occupation: Actor
- Years active: 1987–2011
- Spouse: Whitney Taylor (m. 2004)
- Children: 1

Jordan Brower (born October 14, 1981) is a former American movie actor.

== Biography ==
Jordan was born in Lompoc, California but moved to Texas at an early age. It is there where he got his first break into acting when a film crew from The Big Green notified his soccer coach of auditions. After his soccer coach persuaded him to audition, he got a leading role. Jordan had a supporting role in ABC's TGIF comedy Teen Angel and also worked on Social Studies, a short lived comedy television show detailing the lives of boarding school kids. Since then he has been in several films with minor roles with perhaps his biggest role in the 1998 film Speedway Junky, with Jesse Bradford, Jonathan Taylor Thomas, and Daryl Hannah. Jordan played the role of Eric, a gay hustler in Las Vegas who begins to fall in love with Bradford's straight character, Johnny. The film was shot in 1998, but wasn't released until late August in 2001.

== Filmography ==
=== Film ===
Year	Title	Role
2011	Killer School Girls from Outer Space	Steve
2008	Outrage	Duke
2008	Hallettsville	Mark
2006	Relative Strangers	Prisoner
2005	Shakespeare's Sonnets	Aaron
2001	Texas Rangers	Jake Dunnison
2000	Held for Ransom	Bruce Kirtland
1998	Speedway Junky	Eric
1996	Forest Warrior	Brian Anderson
1996	Sticks & Stones	Hayes
1995	The Big Green	Nick Anderssen

=== Television ===
Year	Title	Role	Notes
2001	Six Feet Under	Topher	Episode: “Crossroads”
1999	Night Ride Home	Simon	TV movie
1999	Providence	Mark	Episode: “Good Fellows”
1998	3rd Rock from the Sun	Steve	Episode: “The Physics of Being Dick”
1998	7th Heaven	Scott	Episode: “It Takes a Village”
1997 –1998	Teen Angel	Jorden Lubell	Main Role; 17 episodes
1997	Social Studies	Matt	5 episodes
1996	Kirk	Ty	Episode: “She Stoops to Conquer”
1995	Baywatch	Darly	Episode: “Surf’s Up”
