= Rebecca Herbst =

American actress (born 1977)

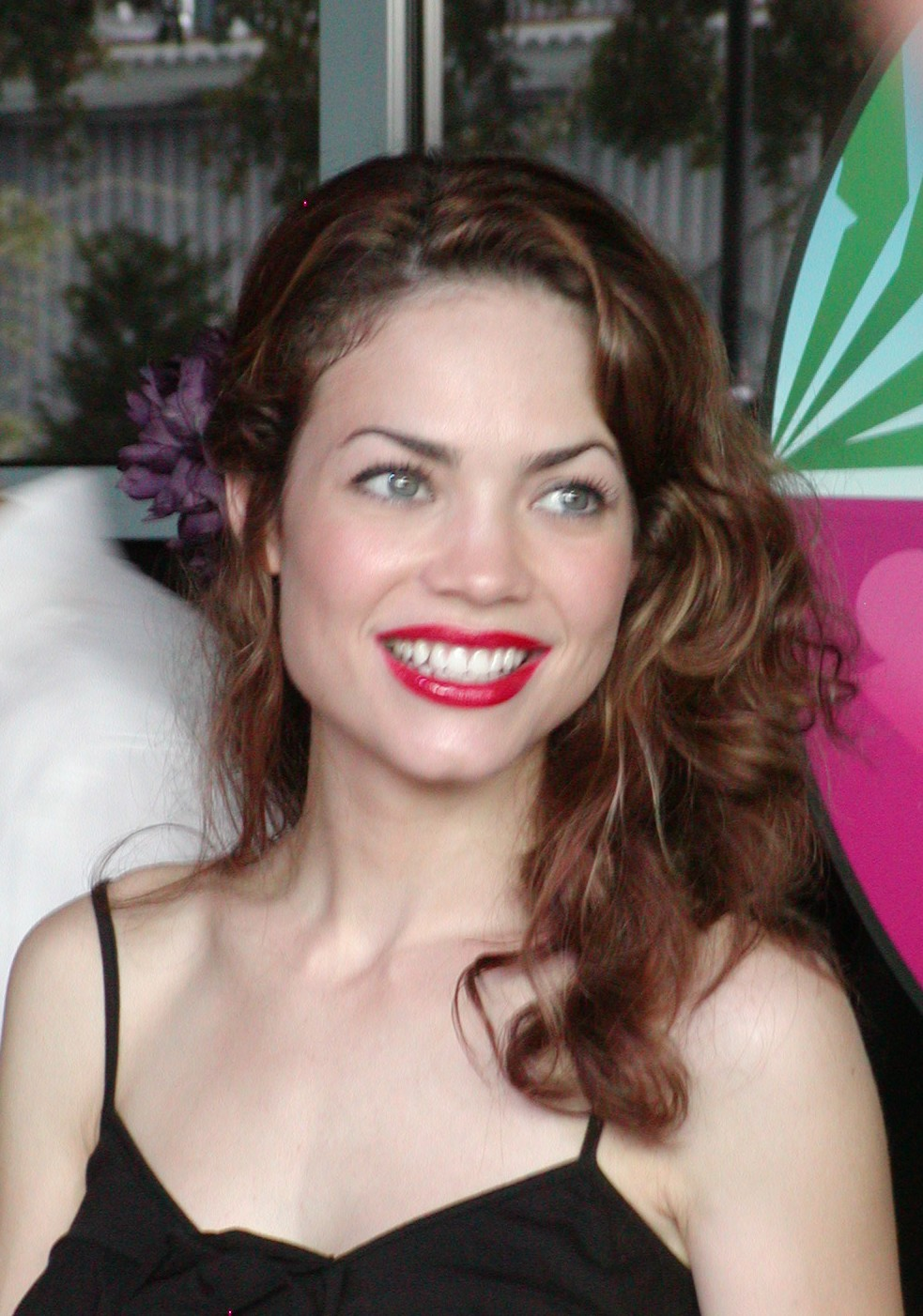
- Herbst in 2008
- Born: Rebecca Ann Herbst; May 12, 1977 (age 49); Encino, California, U.S.
- Other name: Becky Herbst
- Occupation: Actress
- Years active: 1986–present
- Spouse: Michael Saucedo (m. 2001)
- Children: 3

Rebecca Ann Herbst (born May 12, 1977) is an American actress, known for playing Head Nurse Elizabeth Webber on the ABC Daytime drama General Hospital, a role she originated on August 1, 1997, and Suzee, an alien, on the Nickelodeon show, Space Cases.

== Early life ==
Herbst was born in Encino, California. She grew up with parents Debbie and Wayne, and has an older sister, Jennifer. She is not related to General Hospital co-star Rick Hearst (who portrays Ric Lansing, Elizabeth Webber's ex-husband), whose surname was Herbst before he changed it professionally. Herbst was a competitive figure skater as a child, and at age sixteen decided to concentrate on acting.

== Career ==
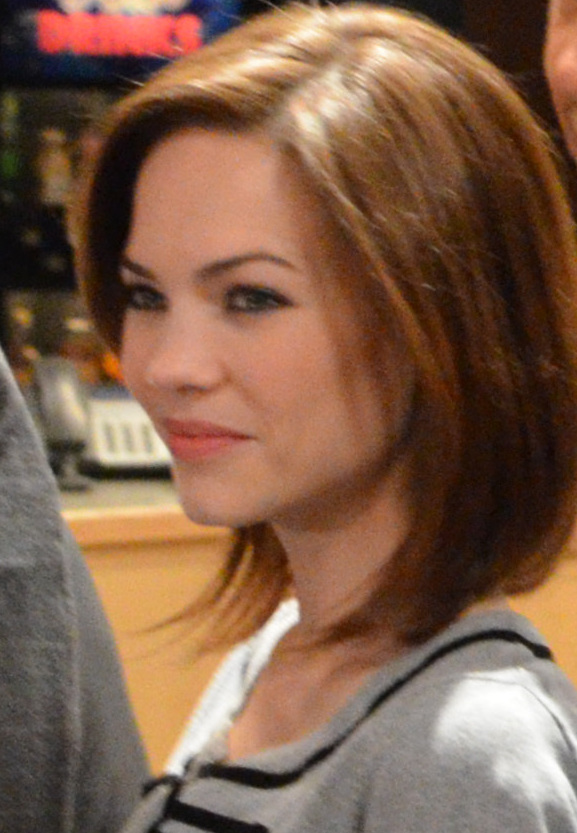
Herbst in 2014

At age six, Herbst stated she wanted to be on television so that she could play with the toys; she began filming commercials and has since appeared in over 60 nationally. She has guest-starred in television series including: Highway to Heaven, L.A. Law, Beverly Hills, 90210, Step By Step, Boy Meets World, Sister, Sister, Days of Our Lives and Brotherly Love. She starred in films including Kaleidoscope, Why Me? and Hefner: Unauthorized. She was also featured in the Goo Goo Dolls 1995 music video "Naked". She was a series regular as Suzee on the second season of the Nickelodeon show, Space Cases from 1996 to 1997.

Herbst began as a series regular as Elizabeth Webber on the ABC Daytime soap opera General Hospital on August 1, 1997. In 1999, Herbst won the Soap Opera Digest Award for Outstanding Younger Lead Actress, and also received a Daytime Emmy Award nomination for Outstanding Younger Actress. In 2000, Soap Opera Update named Herbst No. 6 on their list of Woman of 2000. She was nominated in 2003 for the Soap Opera Digest Award for Outstanding Younger Actress. In 2007, Herbst appeared on Tyra Banks' talk show to help Tyra through "soap opera school." Herbst was nominated for a Daytime Emmy for Outstanding Supporting Actress in a Drama Series in 2007 and 2012.

== Personal life ==
Herbst dated former General Hospital co-star Ingo Rademacher and photographer Johnny Lindesmith in the late 1990s; Lindesmith and Herbst were engaged on December 30, 1999. On June 1, 2001, she married former General Hospital co-star Michael Saucedo (who portrayed Juan Santiago). They have three children, two sons (Ethan and Emerson) and a daughter (Ella).

Herbst also designs clothes. She has designed most of her Daytime Emmy dresses, and dresses for co-stars Natalia Livingston and Kimberly McCullough for the 33rd Daytime Emmy Awards ceremony.

Herbst became a spokeswoman for Purpose Skincare in 2007. She participates in the Smile Train charity.

== Filmography ==
Film and television roles
Year	Title	Role	Notes
1986	L.A. Law	Jennifer Simmons	Episode: "The Princess and the Wiener King"
1987	Highway to Heaven	Young Gail	Episode: "A Mother and a Daughter"
1989	McGee and Me!	Renee's Friend	Episode: "The Big Lie"
1990	Why Me?	Little Girl	
1990	Kaleidoscope	Emily	TV film
1993	Beverly Hills, 90210	Brower Daughter	Episode: "Perfectly Perfect"
1994	Shrunken Heads	Sally	Billed as Becky Herbst
1995	Step by Step	Shelley	Episode: "Can't Buy Me Love"
1995	Boy Meets World	Jill Hollinger	Episode: "Wrong Side of the Tracks"
1995	Donor Unknown	Danielle Stillman	TV film
1995	Sister, Sister	Cynthia	Episode: "Private School"
1996	The Lazarus Man		Episode: "The Wallpaper Prison"
1996	Days of Our Lives	Dana Winthrop	Episode #7810
1996–1997	Space Cases	Suzee	Regular role (14 episodes)
1997	Brotherly Love	Kristen	7 episodes
1997–present	General Hospital	Elizabeth Webber / Jessie Brewer	Regular role / April 1, 2015 episode
1999	Hefner: Unauthorized	Barbi Benton	TV film
2007	General Hospital: Night Shift	Elizabeth Webber	3 episodes

== Awards and nominations ==
Year	Award	Category	Work	Result	Ref.
1999	Soap Opera Digest Award	Outstanding Younger Lead Actress	General Hospital	Won	
1999	Daytime Emmy Award	Outstanding Younger Actress in a Drama Series	General Hospital	Nominated	
2003	Soap Opera Digest Award	Outstanding Younger Lead Actress	General Hospital	Nominated	
2007	Daytime Emmy Award	Outstanding Supporting Actress in a Drama Series	General Hospital	Nominated	
2012	Daytime Emmy Award	Outstanding Supporting Actress in a Drama Series	General Hospital	Nominated	
2020	Soap Hub Awards	Favorite General Hospital Actress	General Hospital	Nominated	
2021	Soap Hub Awards	Favorite General Hospital Actress	General Hospital	Nominated	
