= Hostile Makeover =

- Based on: Hostile Makeover by Ellen Byerrum
- Directed by: Jerry Ciccoritti
- Starring: Maggie Lawson; Mark Consuelos
- Country of origin: United States

Production
- Running time: 90 minutes

Original release
- Network: Lifetime
- Release: June 28, 2009

Hostile Makeover is a Lifetime Movie Network film. It is a sequel to the 2009 television movie Killer Hair and is based on the third book in the "Crime of Fashion" series by Ellen Byerrum.

== Cast ==
- Maggie Lawson as Lacey Smithsonian
- Sadie LeBlanc as Stella Lake
- Sarah Edmondson as Brooke Barton
- Victor Webster as Vic Donovan
- Mark Consuelos as Tony Trujillo
- Mario Cantone as Leonardo
- Serinda Swan as Amanda Manville
- Mary McDonnell as Rose Smithsonian
- Katharine Isabelle as Cherise Smithsonian
- Cindy Busby as Montana McCandless
- Dominic Zamprogna as Tate
- Mark Humphrey as Dr. Gregory Spaulding

== Home media ==
A DVD is available outside the US but iTunes copies of Killer Hair and Hostile Makeover are sold.

== Reception ==
CineMagazine rated the film 2 stars.
