= Social Studies (1997 TV series) =

American sitcom

- Genre: Sitcom
- Created by: Nancylee Myatt
- Starring: Julia Duffy; Adam Ferrara; Chris Owen; Vanessa Evigan; Corbin Allred; Bonnie McFarlane
- Composer: Wendy Levy
- Country of origin: United States
- Original language: English
- No. of seasons: 1
- No. of episodes: 6

Production
- Executive producers: Sandy Gallin; Gail Berman; Dolly Parton
- Camera setup: Multi-camera
- Running time: 30 minutes
- Production companies: Film Fatale; Sandollar Productions; Touchstone Television

Original release
- Network: UPN
- Release: March 18 – April 22, 1997

Social Studies is an American television sitcom that aired on UPN from March 18 to April 22, 1997.

== Premise ==
An administrator at a Manhattan boarding school finds herself at odds with a young, open-minded history teacher over how the students should be educated and disciplined.

== Cast ==
- Julia Duffy as Frances Harmon
- Bonnie McFarlane as Katherine "Kit" Weaver
- Adam Ferrara as Dan Rossini
- Vanessa Evigan as Sara Valentine
- Lisa Wilhoit as Madison Lewis
- Corbin Allred as Chip Wigley
- Monica McSwain as Carla Stone
- Rashaan Nall as Jared Moore
- Jordan Brower as Matt
- Jarrett Lennon as Edgar
- Chris McKibbin as Bryan Bowser
- Chris Owen as Collin McGuirk

== Episodes ==
No.	Title	Directed by	Written by	Original release date	Prod. code
1	"Rhymes with Witch"	J.D. Lobue	Nancylee Myatt	March 18, 1997	S-501
Sara makes Madison's journal public when she thinks Madison turned her in for breaking curfew.
2	"Private School Parts"	J.D. Lobue	Terry Maloney & Mindy Morgenstern	March 25, 1997	S-505
Jared unveils a controversial sculpture at the school's annual art fair. Madison has decided to do live art.
3	"All We Are Saying Is Give Kit a Chance"	J.D. Lobue	Gigi McCreery and Perry Rein	April 1, 1997	S-504
Madison protests the serving of meat in the school cafeteria. Frances forbids Kit from going on a date.
4	"Copy Kits"	J.D. Lobue	Greg Cope & Sean Dwyer	April 8, 1997	S-503
The girls get into trouble when they get fake IDs to get into a nightclub.
5	"Woodridge Uncut"	J.D. Lobue	Nancylee Myatt	April 15, 1997	S-506
Jared and Chip make a documentary about the school in order to impress a former student.
6	"Block Off the Old Chip"	J.D. Lobue	Bob Underwood	April 22, 1997	S-502
Chip's father and Frances starts dating.
