= Lincoln (miniseries) =

- Genre: Biography
- Based on: Lincoln by Gore Vidal
- Screenplay by: Ernest Kinoy
- Directed by: Lamont Johnson
- Starring: Sam Waterston; Mary Tyler Moore; Richard Mulligan; Tim Guinee; John Houseman
- Composer: Ernest Gold
- Country of origin: United States
- Original language: English
- No. of episodes: 2

Production
- Executive producers: Bill Finnegan; Pat Finnegan; Sheldon Pinchuk
- Producer: Bob Christiansen
- Cinematography: William Wages
- Editor: James Oliver
- Running time: 188 minutes
- Production companies: Chris/Rose Productions; Finnegan/Pinchuk Productions

Original release
- Network: NBC
- Release: March 27 – March 28, 1988

Lincoln, also known as Gore Vidal's Lincoln, is a 1988 American television miniseries starring Sam Waterston as Abraham Lincoln, Mary Tyler Moore as Mary Todd Lincoln, and Richard Mulligan as William H. Seward. It was directed by Lamont Johnson and was based on the 1984 novel of the same name by Gore Vidal. It covers the period from Lincoln's election as President of the United States to the time of his assassination. (It can also be noted that Waterston would later dub the voice of Lincoln in Ken Burns's documentary The Civil War the following year.)

Lamont Johnson won an Emmy for directing Lincoln. The miniseries was also nominated for Outstanding Hairstyling for a Miniseries or a Special, Outstanding Art Direction in a Miniseries or a Special, Outstanding Costume Design for a Miniseries or a Special, Outstanding Lead Actress in a Miniseries or a Special (Mary Tyler Moore), Outstanding Directing in a Miniseries or a Special, Outstanding Mini-series and Outstanding Supporting Actress in a Miniseries or a Special (Ruby Dee) at the 40th Primetime Emmy Awards.

The miniseries was filmed almost entirely in Richmond, Virginia and cost $8 million to produce.

It was broadcast by NBC in two episodes, each running two hours (with commercials), on Sunday March 27, 1988 and Monday March 28.

== Cast ==
- Sam Waterston as Abraham Lincoln
- Mary Tyler Moore as Mary Todd Lincoln
- Richard Mulligan as William H. Seward
- Deborah Adair as Kate Chase
- Gregory Cooke as Robert Lincoln
- Steven Culp as Johnny Hay
- Jeffrey DeMunn as William Herndon
- Jon DeVries as Edwin Stanton
- James Gammon as General Ulysses S. Grant
- Thomas Gibson as William Sprague
- Ruby Dee as Elizabeth Keckley
- John Houseman as General Winfield Scott
- Richard Travis as John Nicolay
- Cleavon Little as Frederick Douglass
