= Milo Ventimiglia =

American actor (born 1977)

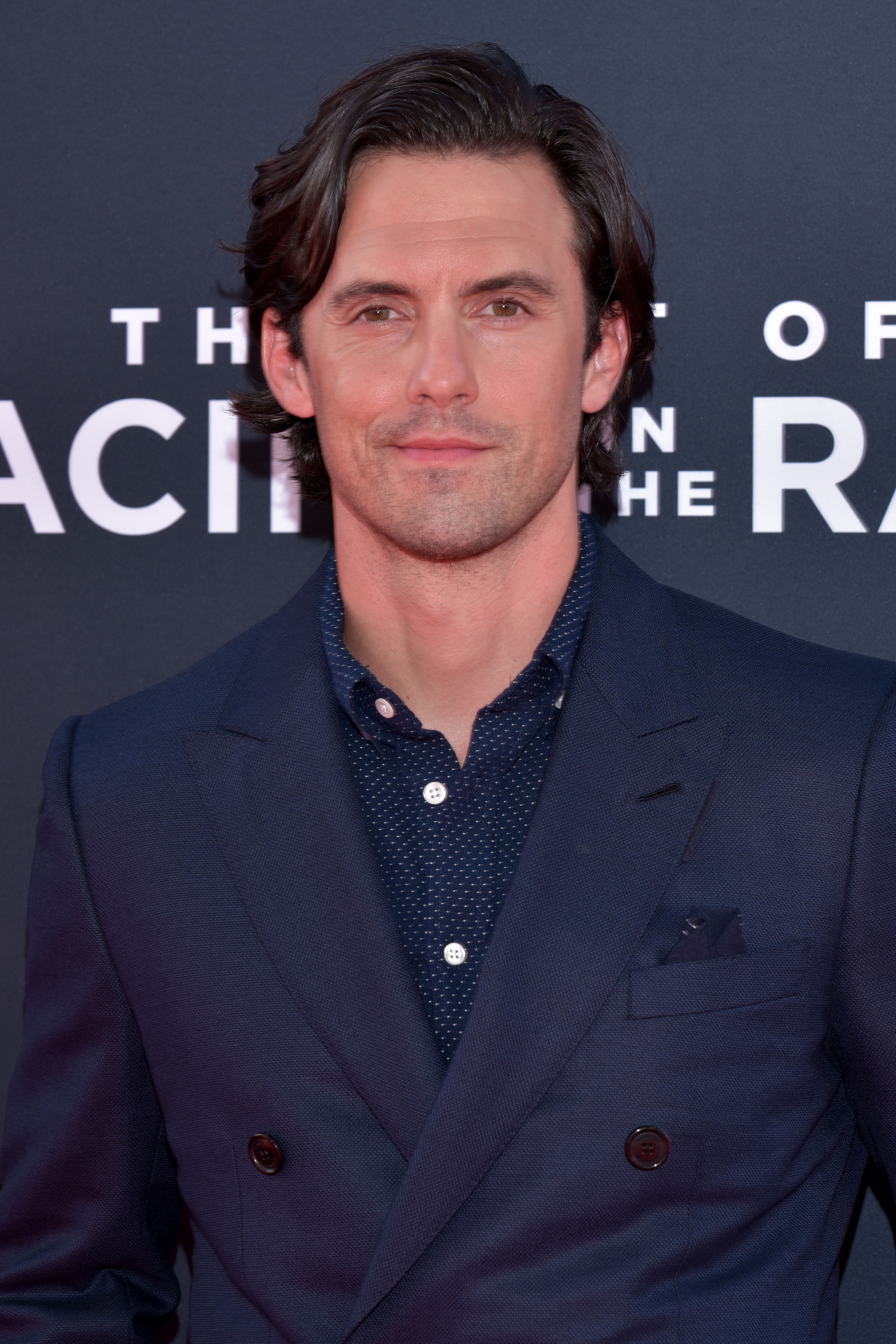
- Ventimiglia in 2019
- Born: Milo Anthony Ventimiglia; July 8, 1977 (age 49); Anaheim, California, U.S.
- Education: University of California, Los Angeles
- Occupation: Actor
- Years active: 1995–present
- Spouse: Jarah Mariano (m. 2023)
- Children: 2

Milo Anthony Ventimiglia (/ˌvɛntɪˈmiːljə/ ven-tim-EEL-yə; born July 8, 1977) is an American actor. Making his screen acting debut on The Fresh Prince of Bel-Air in 1995, he portrayed the lead role on the short-lived series Opposite Sex in 2000 before landing his breakthrough role as Jess Mariano in Gilmore Girls (2001–2006).

Ventimiglia starred as Peter Petrelli in the superhero series Heroes (2006–2010). After appearing in main roles in the series Mob City (2013), Chosen (2013), and The Whispers (2015), he starred as Jack Pearson on This Is Us (2016–2022), for which he has received three nominations for the Primetime Emmy Award for Outstanding Lead Actor in a Drama Series. He also starred in the drama series The Company You Keep (2023).

In film, Ventimiglia made his breakthrough as Rocky Balboa's son in the sixth installment of the Rocky series, Rocky Balboa (2006), and reprised his role in the eighth installment Creed II (2018). He has also appeared in Pathology (2008), That's My Boy (2012), Kiss of the Damned (2013), Grace of Monaco (2014), Devil's Gate (2017), and The Art of Racing in the Rain (2019).

== Early life and education ==
Milo Anthony Ventimiglia was born on July 8, 1977, in Anaheim, California, the youngest child of Carol and Peter Ventimiglia, the latter being a Vietnam War veteran. He has two sisters. Ventimiglia is of Sicilian descent through his father, and of English and Scottish descent through his mother. He has a self-described "crooked mouth," having been born with damaged facial nerves causing the left side of his mouth to remain immobile – much like actor Sylvester Stallone, with whom he worked in Rocky Balboa.

Ventimiglia attended El Modena High School in Orange, California, where he competed in wrestling, acted in drama productions and served as student government president. He graduated in 1995. At 18, Ventimiglia studied at the American Conservatory Theater for their summer program, subsequently attending the University of California, Los Angeles as a theater major.

== Career ==
=== Early roles and breakthrough ===
At eighteen, Ventimiglia pursued an acting career, first starring as a gay teenager in Must Be the Music, a short film released as part of Strand Releasing's Boys Life 2. He enrolled at UCLA before landing a role on The Fresh Prince of Bel-Air, guest starring on television series including CSI: Crime Scene Investigation, Sabrina, the Teenage Witch, Law & Order: Special Victims Unit and Boston Public. He played Jed Perry, in the short-lived Fox TV series, Opposite Sex, which originally aired in 2000.

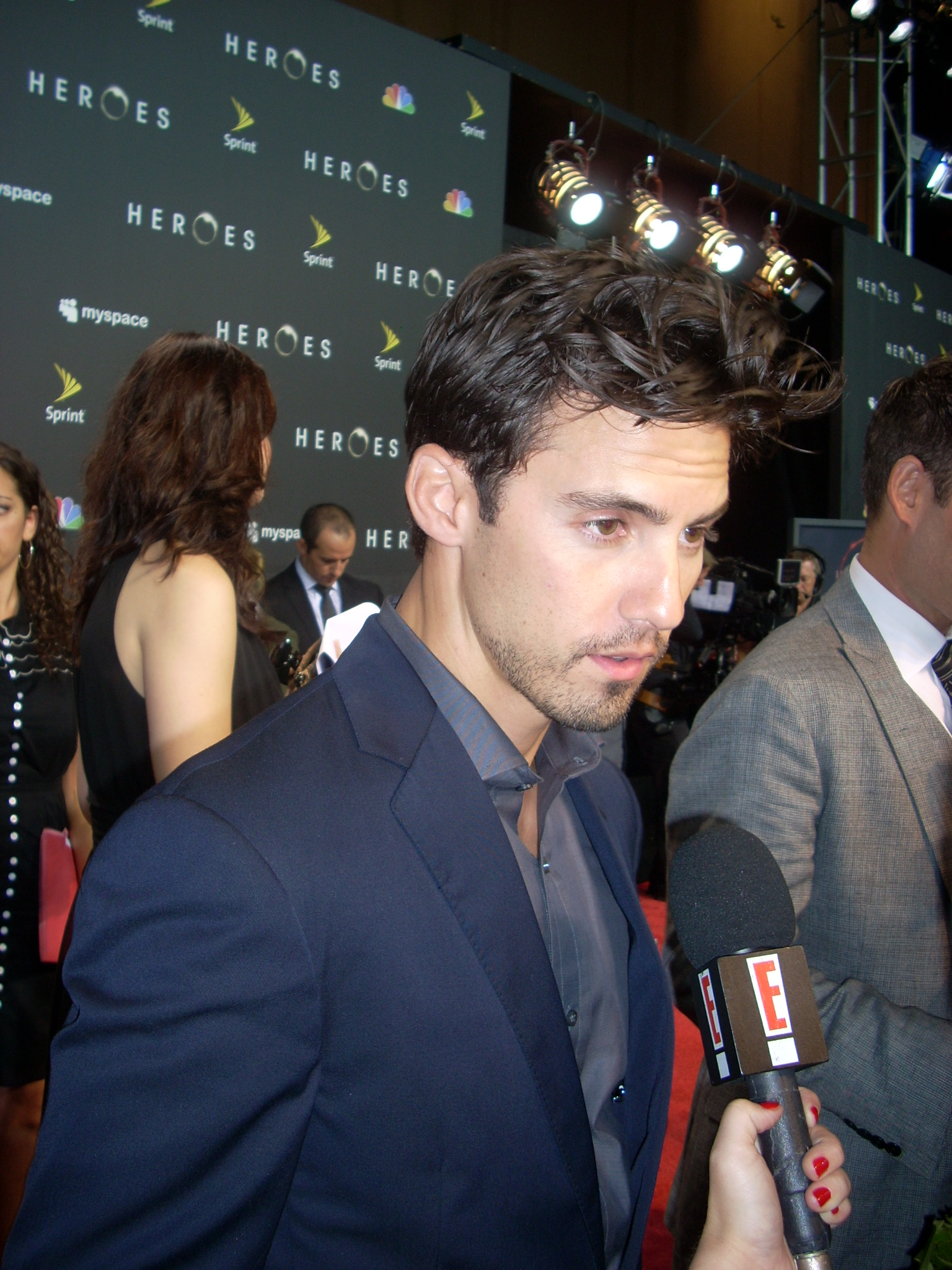
Ventimiglia at the season three premiere of Heroes, 2008

From 2001 to 2006, Ventimiglia played brooding teen Jess Mariano on Gilmore Girls; he was introduced in the second season as a leading cast member. He signed on for a spin-off of Gilmore Girls called Windward Circle which was to be focused on the relationship between Jess and his estranged father (played by Rob Estes), but the proposed series never made it to air. Afterward, he dropped down to a guest star/recurring cast member, and he came back for four episodes in season four and two episodes in season six. In the third and final season of American Dreams, Ventimiglia played Chris Pierce, the rebellious boyfriend of Meg Pryor (Brittany Snow). He starred in the mid-season replacement series The Bedford Diaries. The producers had only Ventimiglia in mind, but the show lasted only eight episodes and was one of several shows not picked up by the newly formed network The CW.

=== Heroes; film and production work ===
In between television work, Ventimiglia had supporting roles in the horror films Cursed (2005), directed by Wes Craven, and Stay Alive (2006), as well as starring roles in the short film Intelligence and the full-length feature Dirty Deeds (2005). The same year, he was cast as Robert "Rocky Jr." Balboa, the son of Rocky Balboa, in the sixth Rocky installment Rocky Balboa which was released in December 2006.

He starred as Peter Petrelli in the NBC series Heroes, a show about "ordinary" people discovering they have superpowers, and portrayed the character until the series' conclusion in 2010. Ventimiglia also produced and developed a mini web-series called It's a Mall World as part of a marketing campaign for American Eagle Outfitters in 2007. In mid-2007, he starred as the love interest of pop/R&B singer Fergie in the music video for "Big Girls Don't Cry". In 2008, he starred as a medical student in the horror film Pathology. The film co-starred Charmed actress Alyssa Milano and was directed by Marc Schölermann for MGM.

=== DiVide Pictures ===
In 2004, Milo Ventimiglia co-founded the American production company DiVide Pictures with producer Russ Cundiff. The American production company develops scripted and unscripted content across film, television, and digital platforms. As of 2024, the company has been involved in the development of over 30 projects for various networks and studios. DiVide Pictures is under an exclusive television development deal with 20th Television, a division of Disney Television Studios. In 2023, it produced The Company You Keep for ABC, in which Ventimiglia starred and served as an executive producer. The company’s film credits include Tell and Static. DiVide has also produced branded content in collaboration with companies such as eBay, Cadillac, and GQ.

=== Film and television; This Is Us ===
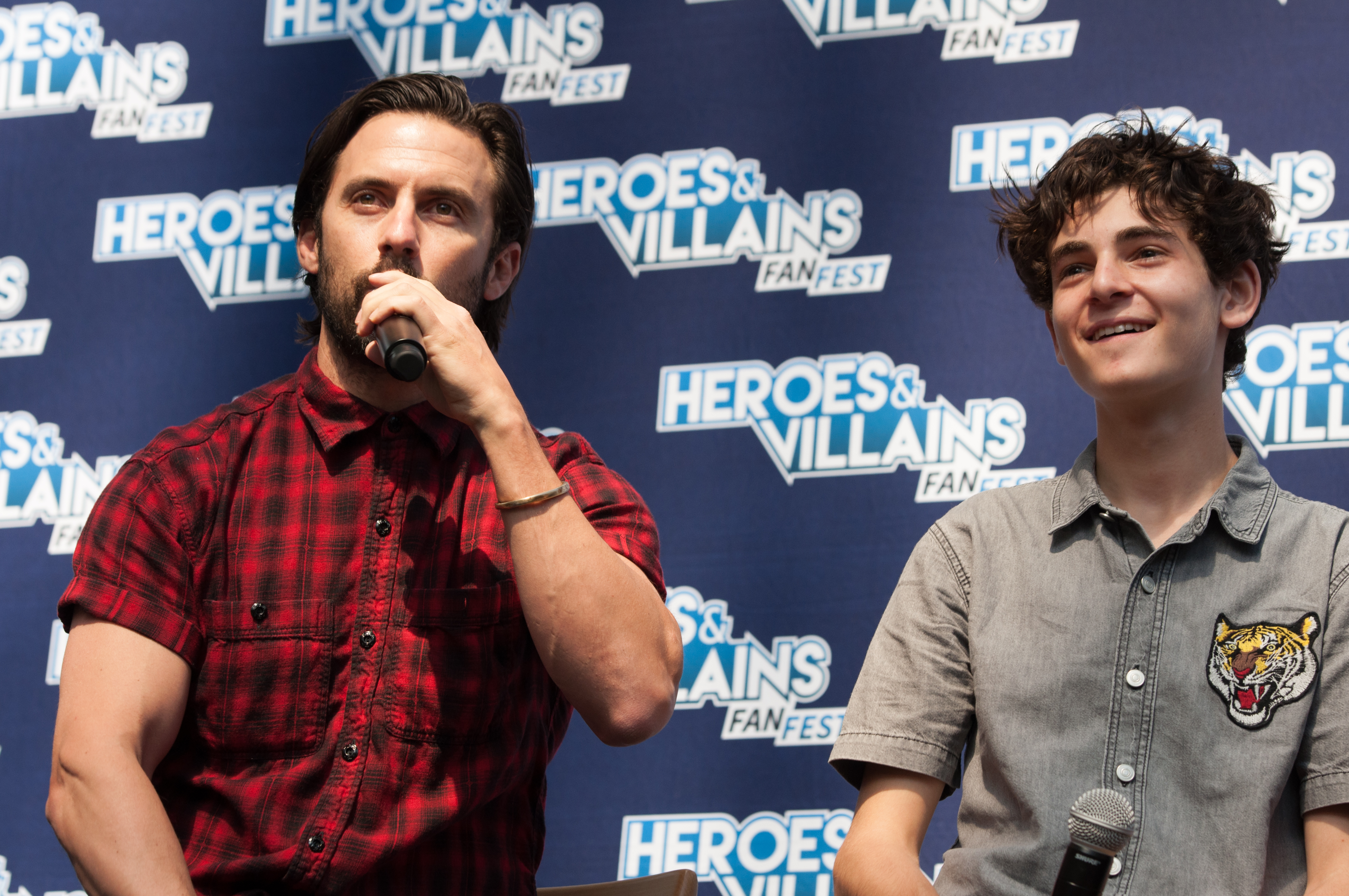
Ventimiglia with David Mazouz promoting Gotham, London, 2017

After working with writers Mark Neveldine and Brian Taylor on Pathology, Ventimiglia appeared in the pair's next film, Gamer. Ventimiglia also starred in the Xavier Gens apocalypse thriller film, The Divide.

Ventimiglia was the voice of Wolverine in the English dub of the Marvel Anime: Wolverine anime series and reprised his role in an episode of the Marvel Anime: Iron Man and an episode of Marvel Anime: Blade. He did not return to voice Wolverine in Marvel Anime: X-Men, due to that series portraying an older Wolverine, instead Wolverine was voiced by Steven Blum. He played Ned Stax, a former marine, in Frank Darabont's short-lived neo-noir crime drama Mob City for TNT. He also reprised his role as Jess Mariano in Gilmore Girls: A Year in the Life in November 2016. After this, he reportedly told USA Today that, "I hear rumors that they're bringing back everything that I've ever been a part of... I think it's exciting. At times, though, I think it's too much. There are more stories to tell with a lot of these characters, but at the same time some of these characters for some of us actors are more than a decade in the past. It was exciting going back to Gilmore Girls for the four Netflix movies, but I'm satisfied with it. I think the stories were told. I think it was great for the audience and fans to get just one small taste of that world again. But, at the same time, I think people should not get so greedy."

Beginning in the fall of 2016, Ventimiglia starred opposite Mandy Moore in the critically acclaimed NBC period drama series This Is Us playing Jack Pearson, the patriarch of a middle-class family in late 1980s/early 1990s America. In 2017 Ventimiglia starred in the suspense thriller Devil's Gate alongside Amanda Schull. For his role as Jack Pearson, Ventimiglia received his first Emmy nomination in the category Outstanding Lead Actor in a Drama Series.

In 2019, Ventimiglia starred opposite Amanda Seyfried in the film adaptation of The Art of Racing in the Rain, based on the novel by Garth Stein.

== Personal life ==
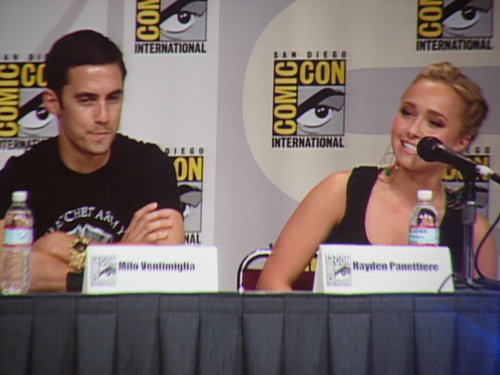
Ventimiglia and Hayden Panettiere at San Diego Comic-Con in 2007

Ventimiglia and fellow former Gilmore Girls co-star Alexis Bledel were in a relationship from 2002 to July 2006. Ventimiglia also dated his Heroes co-star Hayden Panettiere from December 2007 to February 2009.

Ventimiglia and his sisters were raised as lacto-vegetarians, and he has maintained the diet as an adult. He was named People for the Ethical Treatment of Animals' Sexiest Vegetarian in 2009. He also does not smoke cigarettes or drink alcohol.

Ventimiglia is a fan of rock bands The Clash and The Smiths, as well as the latter band's long-time vocalist, Morrissey.

In July 2008, Ventimiglia completed a United Service Organization tour in support of American troops in Kuwait, Iraq and Afghanistan.

In September 2023, Ventimiglia married model Jarah Mariano. They have two children.

His home in Malibu was consumed by the January 2025 Southern California wildfires.

== Filmography ==
=== Film ===
Year	Title	Role	Notes
1997	Boys Life 2	Jason	Segment: "Must Be the Music"
1999	She's All That	Soccer Player	
1999	Speedway Junky	Travis	
2000	Massholes	Doc	
2001	Nice Guys Finish Last	Josh	Short film
2003	Winter Break	Matt Raymand	
2005	Cursed	Bo	
2005	Dirty Deeds	Zach Harper	
2006	Intelligence	Colin Mathers	Short film
2006	Stay Alive	Loomis Crowley	
2006	Rocky Balboa	Rocky Balboa Jr.	
2008	Pathology	Dr. Ted Grey	
2009	Gamer	Rick Rape	
2009	Armored	Officer Jake Eckehart	
2010	Order of Chaos	Rick	
2011	The Divide	Josh	
2012	That's My Boy	Chad Martin	
2012	Static	Jonathan Dade	Also executive producer
2013	Kiss of the Damned	Paulo	
2013	Grown Ups 2	Frat Boy Milo	
2013	Breaking at the Edge	Ian Wood	
2013	Killing Season	Chris Ford	
2014	Grace of Monaco	Rupert Allan	
2014	Tell	Ethan Tell	Also producer
2015	Walter	Vince	
2015	Wild Card	Danny DeMarco	
2016	Madtown	Denny Briggs	
2017	Sandy Wexler	Barry Bubatzi	
2017	Devil's Gate	Jackson Pritchard	
2018	Creed II	Rocky Balboa Jr.	
2018	Second Act	Trey	
2019	The Art of Racing in the Rain	Denny Swift	
2024	Land of Bad	Captain Sugar	
2026	I Can Only Imagine 2	Tim Timmons	

=== Television ===
Year	Title	Role	Notes
1995	The Fresh Prince of Bel-Air	Party Guest No. 1	Episode: "Bourgie Sings the Blues"
1996	Sabrina, the Teenage Witch	Letterman	Episode: "Terrible Things"
1996	Saved by the Bell: The New Class	Greg	Episode: "Hospital Blues"
1997	EZ Streets	Young Cameron Quinn	Episode: "A Terrible Beauty"
1998	Brooklyn South	Johnny Mancuso	Episode: "Hospital Blues"
1998	Kelly Kelly	Steve Spencer	Episode: "Bye Bye Baby"
1998	One World	Eric	Episode: "Community Service"
1999	Promised Land	Tony Brackett	Episode: "In the Money"
2000	Opposite Sex	Jed Perry	Main role; 8 episodes
2000	CSI: Crime Scene Investigation	Bobby Taylor	Episode: "Friends & Lovers"
2001–2006	Gilmore Girls	Jess Mariano	37 episodes
2003	Boston Public	Jake Provesserio	3 episodes
2003	Law & Order: Special Victims Unit	Lee Healy	Episode: "Escape"
2004–2005	American Dreams	Chris Pierce	12 episodes
2006	The Bedford Diaries	Richard Thorne III	Main role; 8 episodes
2006–2010	Heroes	Peter Petrelli	Main role; 70 episodes
2008	Robot Chicken	Green Arrow	Voice, episode: "They Took My Thumbs"
2010	The Webventures of Justin and Alden	Himself	Episode: "The Last Episode"
2010	Iron Man	Wolverine / Logan	Voice, episode "A Twist of Memory, A Turn of Mind"
2011	Suite 7	Milo	Episode: "That Guy"
2011	The Temp Life	Cook	2 episodes
2011	Wolverine	Wolverine / Logan	Voice, 12 episodes
2012	Blade	Wolverine / Logan	Voice, episode "Day Walker and Mutant (Claws and Blades)"
2013	Mob City	Ned Stax	Main role; 6 episodes
2013	Chosen	Ian Mitchell	Main role; 11 episodes
2015	Gotham	Jason Lennon / Ogre	3 episodes
2015	The PET Squad Files	Cash Buggiardo	4 episodes
2015	The Whispers	Sean Bennigan	Main role; 13 episodes
2015	The League	Agent Baker	Episode: "The Block"
2015–2016	Ultimate Spider-Man	Spider-Man Noir	Voice, 4 episodes
2016	Relationship Status	Jack	Web series; 3 episodes
2016	Gilmore Girls: A Year in the Life	Jess Mariano	2 episodes
2016–2022	This Is Us	Jack Pearson	Main role; occasional director
2022–2023	The Marvelous Mrs. Maisel	Sylvio / "Handsome man"	2 episodes
2023	The Company You Keep	Charlie Nicoletti	Main role, also executive producer
2025	Countdown	Robert Darden	Episode: “Teeth in the Bone”
2026	I Will Find You	Hayden Payne	8 episodes

=== Podcasts ===
Year	Title	Role	Notes	Ref.
2021	Strawberry Spring	Kevin Hartigan	8 episodes	

=== Music videos ===
Year	Title	Artist	Role
2007	"Big Girls Don't Cry (Personal)"	Fergie	Love interest
2014	"I Can't Make You Love Me"	Priyanka Chopra	Love interest

=== Video games ===
Year	Title	Role	Notes
2011	X-Men: Destiny	Grant Alexander	Voice role
2025	Call of Duty: Black Ops 7	David “Section” Mason	Voice and motion capture

=== As director ===
Year	Title	Notes
2007	It's a Mall World	Miniseries; 13 episodes
2009	Dave Knoll Finds His Soul	
2010	Ultradome	Episode: Han Solo vs. Indiana Jones
2011	Suite 7	Episode: "That Guy"
2019	This Is Us	Episode #59: "Storybook Love"
2021	This Is Us	Episode #87: "Jerry 2.0"
2022	This Is Us	Episode #96: "The Guitar Man"

=== As producer ===
Year	Title	Notes
2007	It's a Mall World	Producer; 13 episodes
2007	Winter Tales	Producer
2009	Dave Knoll Finds His Soul	Executive producer
2010	Ultradome	Executive producer; 3 episodes
2011	Suite 7	Producer; episode: "That Guy"
2012	Static	Executive producer
2013	The PET Squad Files	Executive producer; 6 episodes
2013	Chosen	Executive producer; 18 episodes
2014	Tell	Producer
2023	The Company You Keep	Executive producer

=== Writer ===
Year	Title	Notes
2010	Ultradome	Co-creator

== Awards and nominations ==
Year	Ceremony	Category	Nominated work	Result
2004	Bravo Otto	Best Male TV Star	Gilmore Girls	Nominated
2007	Teen Choice Awards	Choice Drama TV Actor of the Year	Heroes	Nominated
2007	Scream Awards	Best TV Superhero	Heroes	Nominated
2008	Teen Choice Awards	Choice Action or Adventure TV Actor of the Year	Heroes	Won
2008	Monte-Carlo Television Festival	Golden Nymph Award for Best Actor in a Drama Series	Heroes	Nominated
2009	Saturn Awards	Best Television Supporting Actor	Heroes	Nominated
2014	International Academy of Web Television Awards	Best Male Performance in a Drama Television Series	Chosen	Won
2017	Primetime Emmy Awards	Outstanding Lead Actor in a Drama Series	This Is Us	Nominated
2017	Online Film & Television Association Awards	Best Television Drama Series Actor	This Is Us	Nominated
2017	People's Choice Awards	Favorite Actor In A New TV Series	This Is Us	Nominated
2017	Teen Choice Awards	Choice Drama TV Actor of the Year	This Is Us	Nominated
2018	Primetime Emmy Awards	Outstanding Lead Actor in a Drama Series	This Is Us	Nominated
2018	Gold Derby Awards	TV Drama Series Actor of the Year	This Is Us	Nominated
2018	Gold Derby Awards	TV Ensemble of the Year	This Is Us	Nominated
2018	Online Film & Television Association Awards	Best Television Drama Series Actor	This Is Us	Nominated
2018	Screen Actors Guild Awards	Outstanding Performance by a Cast in a Television Drama Series	This Is Us	Won
2019	Primetime Emmy Awards	Outstanding Lead Actor in a Drama Series	This Is Us	Nominated
2019	Critics' Choice Awards	Best Television Drama Series Actor	This Is Us	Nominated
2019	People's Choice Awards	Favorite Male TV Star of the Year	This Is Us	Nominated
2019	Screen Actors Guild Awards	Outstanding Performance by a Cast in a Television Drama Series	This Is Us	Won
2019	Harvard University's Hasty Pudding Theatricals Awards	Man of the Year	—N/a	Honored
