= Jarah Mariano =

American model (born 1983)

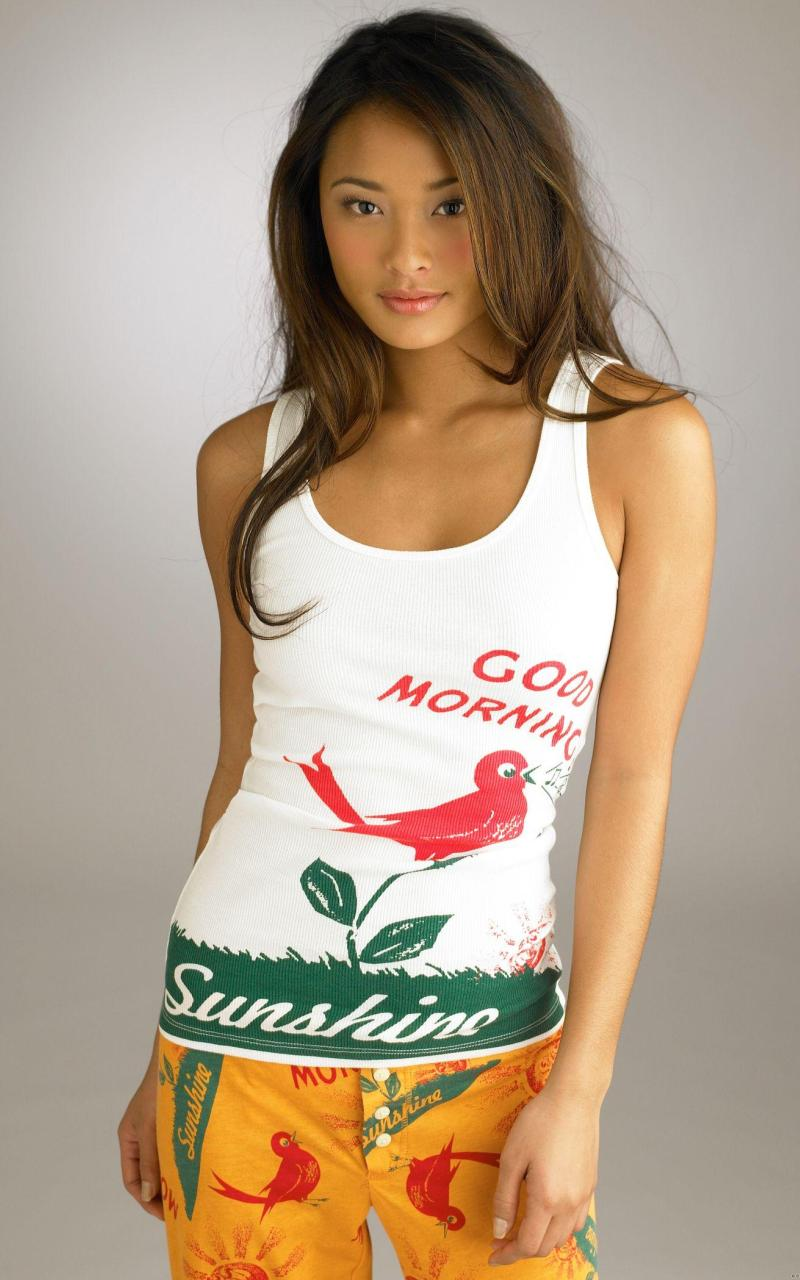
- Jarah Mariano
- Born: Jarah-Evelyn Makalapua Mariano; November 23, 1983 (age 42); Kauai, Hawaii, U.S.
- Spouse: Milo Ventimiglia (m. 2023)
- Children: 2
- Modeling information
- Height: 1.73 m (5 ft 8 in)
- Hair color: Brown
- Eye color: Brown

Jarah-Evelyn Makalapua Mariano (born November 23, 1983) is an American model best known for her appearances in the 2008 and 2009 Sports Illustrated Swimsuit Editions, as well as Victoria's Secret.

== Early life ==
Mariano was born in the city of Lihue on the island of Kauai in Hawaii. At the age of four Mariano relocated with her family to California, where she was raised in the city of Mission Viejo with her two older brothers. At the age of 15 she was discovered in Santa Monica, California by a model scout, Corrie Caster. After graduating from Trabuco Hills High School, she moved to New York City, where she continued to model and attended Pace University as a full-time student, receiving her degree in Speech Communications with a Media Studies Concentration.

Mariano is of Korean and Native Hawaiian descent.

== Career ==
Mariano has appeared in ads for Abercrombie & Fitch, MAC, Armani Exchange, Sephora, Roxy Quiksilver, Redken, H&M, Avon, Old Navy, Dereon, Levi's, PacSun and Rock and Republic, as well as numerous catalogs for Victoria's Secret. She graced the April/May 2007 cover for Complex Magazine's 5th Anniversary Issue and has appeared in fashion magazines such as Self, Taiwan Vogue, L'uomo Vogue, Glamour, Elle and Italian Vanity Fair. She has walked in fashion shows in Miami and New York. Mariano made her Sports Illustrated Swimsuit Edition debut in 2008 and followed up this appearance in 2009. She appeared uncredited in the title sequence of the James Bond film Skyfall in 2012.

Mariano's television credits include Jay-Z's comeback music video "Show Me What You Got" and a cameo in the NBC television series Chuck, several commercials for Old Navy, minor roles in Steven Spielberg's Minority Report and Hal Hartley's The Girl from Monday, as well as a recurring role in Rescue Me. In 2009, she appeared in the music video for "Love Again" and "Kiss Kiss Kiss (키스키스키스)" by experimental fusion music Korean group Clazziquai Project.

== Personal life ==
In September 2023, Mariano married actor Milo Ventimiglia. They have two children.
