= Love Rules! =

- Written by: Alan Marc Levy
- Directed by: Steven Robman
- Starring: Joey Lawrence; Maggie Lawson
- Original language: English

Production
- Producer: Kevin Lafferty
- Running time: 90 mins
- Production companies: WildRice Productions; ABC Family Original Productions
- Budget: $5,000,000

Original release
- Network: ABC Family
- Release: June 5, 2004

Love Rules is a 2004 comedy film starring Joey Lawrence and Maggie Lawson, airing on ABC Family on June 5, 2004. On its premiere night, Love Rules opened up with 4.1 million viewers tuning in for its premiere.

== Plot ==
When Kelly and Michael decide to get married, they want to have an off-beat wedding without all the traditional glitz. But when their friends and Kelly's mother introduce them to the rules of engagement, a simple, intimate wedding becomes a huge production.

== Cast ==
- Joey Lawrence as Michael
- Maggie Lawson as Kelly
- Marilu Henner as Carol
- Sergio Di Zio as Kevin
- Anna Silk as Lynn
- Adam MacDonald as Brian
- Elisa Moolecherry as Anne
