= Hefner: Unauthorized =

1999 American television film

- Directed by: Peter Werner
- Music by: Peter Manning Robinson
- Country of origin: United States
- Original language: English

Production
- Running time: 97 minutes

Original release
- Release: December 8, 1999

Hefner: Unauthorized is a 1999 television film about Hugh Hefner.

== Premise ==
The unauthorized biography of Hugh Hefner and the birth of the Playboy empire.

== Cast ==
- Randall Batinkoff as Hugh Hefner
- Natasha Gregson Wagner as Bobbie Arnstein
- Rebecca Herbst as Barbi Benton
- Rebecca Romijn as Kimberly Hefner
- Mark Harelik as Mike Wallace
- Gail Cronauer as Grace Hefner
