= Killer Hair =

- Based on: Killer Hair by Ellen Byerrum
- Directed by: Patricia Dyar Waldon; Ania Musialowicz
- Starring: Maggie Lawson; Lynda Boyd
- Country of origin: United States

Production
- Running time: 90 minutes

Original release
- Network: Lifetime
- Release: June 21, 2009

Based on a book written by Ellen Byerrum (Crime of Fashion), Killer Hair (also known as Crime of Fashion: Killer Hair or Killer Hair: A Crime of Fashion Mystery) is a television film that aired on the Lifetime Movie Network in 2009. The storyline follows a fashion journalist, Lacey Smithsonian, as she investigates the discovery of a dead body inside her friend's Washington, DC hair salon.

== Synopsis ==
The story begins with the discovery of an emerging fashion stylist's dead body. Angie Woods, a stylist recognized for succeeding with difficult rejuvenation jobs, is found dead with a razor in her hand. Investigators suggest that Woods committed suicide because of the unattractive hairstyle she was wearing. Smithsonian (Maggie Lawson), a fashion columnist and amateur private investigator, is an acquaintance of Woods and suspects something more sinister; she believes that a notable client of Woods, a congressional staffer with a salacious web site, is somehow implicated. Detective Vic Donovan (Victor Webster) is assigned to the case. This causes complications due to his prior romantic affair with Smithsonian.

== Cast and characters ==
- Lacey Smithsonian - Maggie Lawson
- Stella Lake - Sadie LeBlanc
- Brooke Barton - Sarah Edmondson
- Vic Donovan - Victor Webster
- Mac - James McDaniel
- Tony Trujillo - Mark Consuelos
- Felicity Pickles - Jocelyne Loewen
- Detective Harding - Jason Schombing
- Agent Thorn - Peter Kelamis
- Josette Radford - Finola Hughes
- Boyd Radford - Christopher Shyer
- Beau Radford - Christopher Jacot
- Marcia Robinson - Lynda Boyd
- Rose Smithsonian - Mary McDonnell
- Charise Smithsomian - Katharine Isabelle
- Sherri Gold - Carmen Moore
- Tammi - Sarah Smyth

== Sequel ==
A sequel based on another book by Byerrum, Hostile Makeover, was televised seven days after this film, on June 28, 2009.

== Release formats ==
The film was released on DVD in various countries and an iTunes version was available exclusively in the United States.
