= Devil's Gate (2017 film) =

2017 American horror thriller film

- Film poster
- Directed by: Clay Staub
- Written by: Peter Aperlo; Clay Staub
- Produced by: Ian Dimerman; Brendon Sawatzky; Valérie d'Auteuil
- Starring: Amanda Schull; Shawn Ashmore; Milo Ventimiglia; Bridget Regan; Jonathan Frakes
- Cinematography: Miroslaw Baszak
- Edited by: Yvann Thibaudeau
- Music by: Keefus Ciancia
- Production companies: Mednick Productions; Caramel Films; Unquiet Leaves Entertainment
- Distributed by: IFC Midnight
- Release dates: April 24, 2017 (Tribeca); January 5, 2018 (United States)
- Running time: 94 minutes
- Country: United States
- Language: English
- Box office: $29,564

Devil's Gate is a 2017 American supernatural horror film written and directed by Clay Staub from a screenplay by Peter Aperlo. The film stars Amanda Schull, Shawn Ashmore, Milo Ventimiglia, Bridget Regan and Jonathan Frakes.

It had its world premiere at the Tribeca Film Festival on April 24, 2017. It was released January 5, 2018, by IFC Midnight.

== Synopsis ==
Set in the small town of Devil's Gate, North Dakota, the film examines the disappearance of a local woman and her young son. Schull plays an FBI agent who helps the local sheriff search for answers. Partnering with a deputy, they track down the missing woman's husband and find that nothing is as it seems.

== Cast ==
- Amanda Schull as FBI Special Agent Daria Francis
- Shawn Ashmore as Deputy Conrad "Colt" Salter
- Milo Ventimiglia as Jackson Pritchard
- Bridget Regan as Maria Pritchard
- Jonathan Frakes as Sheriff Gruenwell

== Critical reception ==
Devil's Gate holds a 38% rating on Rotten Tomatoes, based on 16 critic reviews and hold an average rating of 5.17/10.

The Village Voice wrote, "What’s most disappointing is that Staub proves himself to be a formidable director of action and visual effects. Please, someone just give him a better story." The Hollywood Reporter, Los Angeles Times, and New York Times also panned the film.
