= Gregory Cooke =

English actor and director (born 1966)

- Born: 1 January 1966 (age 59); Wimbledon, London, England
- Occupation(s): Actor and director
- Height: 6 ft 1 (1.85 m)

Gregory Cooke (born 1 January 1966) is an English actor who best known for playing Robert Todd Lincoln in the 1988 miniseries Lincoln and wireless operator Jack Phillips on the 1997 blockbuster Titanic by James Cameron.

He was born in Wimbledon, England but grew up in Richmond-upon-Thames. His father Alan was a theatre director and he has a sister.

== Filmography ==
=== Acting ===
- 2002: Wishcraft as Detective Jeff Bauer
- 1997: Titanic as Jack Phillips
- 1995: JAG (1 episode) as Warren Robinson
- 1995: Jury Duty as Fishburne
- 1992: Melrose Place (2 episodes) as Casting Director
- 1991: Palace Guard (1 episode)
- 1989: The Strange Case of Dr. Jekyll and Mr. Hyde as Richard Utterson, Jekyll's Assistant
- 1989: Nightmare Classics (4 episodes) as Richard Utterson
- 1989: Tales from the Crypt (1 episode) as Hamlet Actor
- 1989: Naked Lie as Phil Berman
- 1988: Lincoln (2 episodes) as Robert Lincoln
- 1987: Beauty and the Beast (1 episode)
- 1986: ALF (1 episode) as Michael
- 1982: Fame (1 episode)

=== Other credits ===
- 2000: Boys Life 3, Director/Writer
- 1999: $30, Director
