= Outmatched =

American sitcom television series

- Genre: Sitcom
- Created by: Lon Zimmet
- Starring: Jason Biggs; Maggie Lawson; Tisha Campbell; Ashley Boettcher; Connor Kalopsis; Jack Stanton; Oakley Bull; Finesse Mitchell
- Music by: Duncan Blickenstaff
- Country of origin: United States
- Original language: English
- No. of seasons: 1
- No. of episodes: 10

Production
- Executive producer: Lon Zimmet
- Producers: Kevin C. Slattery; Rachael Field
- Cinematography: Joe Pennella
- Editors: Brent Carpenter; Richard Candib
- Camera setup: Multi-camera
- Running time: 21–23 minutes
- Production companies: Briskets Big Yellow House; Fox Entertainment; 20th Century Fox Television

Original release
- Network: Fox
- Release: January 23 – March 26, 2020

Outmatched is an American multi-camera television sitcom created by Lon Zimmet for the Fox Broadcasting Company. It aired from January 23 to March 26, 2020. In May 2020, Fox canceled the series after one season.

== Premise ==
The series follows a blue-collar couple in Atlantic City trying to get by and raise four kids—three of whom are certified geniuses.

== Cast ==
=== Main ===
- Jason Biggs as Mike Bennett, Kay's husband and a blue-collar home contractor.
- Maggie Lawson as Kay Bennett, Mike's wife and a pit boss at a local casino.
- Tisha Campbell as Rita, a blackjack dealer and Kay's best friend.
- Ashley Boettcher as Nicole Bennett, Mike and Kay's older gifted 15 year old daughter. Nicole has a high language proficiency, speaking at least 5 fluently, as well as a having a strong computer science knowledge. Of the three geniuses, Nicole is the most socially aware.
- Connor Kalopsis as Brian Bennett, Mike and Kay's eldest gifted 16 year old son. Brian is the most socially awkward of the genius trio and has a high proficiency in the sciences.
- Jack Stanton as Marc Bennett, Mike and Kay's younger gifted 10 year old son who has only just been certified as a genius. Marc has a strong interest and gift in art and music.
- Oakley Bull as Leila Bennett, Mike and Kay's youngest 8 year old daughter who they don't believe is gifted (though she secretly turns out to be an artistic prodigy) and, therefore, they consider her to be the "normal" child.
- Finesse Mitchell as Irwin, Mike's best friend and Rita's husband.

=== Guest starring ===
- Tony Danza as Jay Bennett, Mike's father.
- Caroline Aaron as Sylvia Bennett, Mike's mother and Jay's wife.
- Alyson Hannigan as Beth, Atticus's mother with several animal-like senses.
- Eddie Kaye Thomas as Sigmund, Atticus's father who loves rollerblading.

== Production ==
=== Development ===
On January 23, 2019, it was announced that Fox had given the production, then titled Geniuses, received a pilot order commitment. The pilot was written by Lon Zimmet who was also set to executive produce. Production companies involved with the pilot include Fox Entertainment and Disney's owned 20th Century Fox Television. The network green-lighted the series to order on May 9, 2019 and titled changed as Outmatched. A few days later, it was announced that the series would premiere as a mid-season replacement in the winter of 2019–2020. On May 19, 2020, Fox canceled the series after one season.

=== Casting ===
In February 2019, it was announced that Maggie Lawson and Jason Biggs had been cast in the pilot's leading roles. Tisha Campbell joined the cast in March. In December, Finesse Mitchell was announced to be in the main cast, first appearing in the second episode.

On January 10, 2020, it was reported Tony Danza would guest star in the series as the father of Biggs' character. On February 6, it was announced that Biggs would reunite with American Pie co-stars Alyson Hannigan and Eddie Kaye Thomas in an episode.

=== Filming ===
Outmatched was filmed at Radford Studio Center in Studio City, California, but it is set in Atlantic City, New Jersey.

== Release ==
=== Marketing ===
On May 13, 2019, Fox released the first official trailer for the series.

== Episodes ==
No.	Title	Directed by	Written by	Original release date	Prod. code	U.S. viewers (millions)
1	"Pilot"	Jonathan Judge	Lon Zimmet	January 23, 2020	1BYF01	3.20
Mike and Kay Bennett live in a house with their four kids, three of whom (Brian, Nicole, and Marc) possess genius-level intelligence. Despite being incredibly smart, Kay is terrified that their lack of social skills will make it impossible for them to lead normal lives. She and Mike therefore decide to take the kids on a trip to the boardwalk. Unfortunately, Brian insists on bringing his nerdy 35-year old friend along, Nicole refuses to leave after learning that she has a lower IQ than her brother, and Marc trashes the house for an “experiment”. Kay has had enough and Mike steps in, telling the kids he's disappointed in them. The fourth child, Leila, then lies and tells her siblings that Kay wanted to do something special for her birthday. Out of guilt, the kids pitch in to make up for their poor behavior by building a replica boardwalk for Kay in the house.
2	"The Talk"	Betsy Thomas	Lon Zimmet	January 30, 2020	1BYF02	2.34
When Mike and Kay find Brian 3D-printing an artificial heart valve, they mistake it for a female private part. They try to give Brian and Nicole the sex talk but it backfires and the children end up giving them the talk instead. After this, Nicole and Brian become convinced that they're old enough to be having sex. Brian prints a 3D face to practice kissing. Nicole comes up with potential boys to be her first kiss but when Leila gets into her head, she gets worried that she'll be bad at it. She tries to practice kissing on her brother's 3D face, but he refuses. When Kay and Mike catch them fighting over it, they help the children realize that there's no need to rush and should wait until they're ready.
3	"Grandparents"	Betsy Thomas	Dan Rubin	February 6, 2020	1BYF05	2.66
Mike's parents visit; his father Jay continues to criticize his son for not raising his kids properly while Kay has to deal with his overbearing mother Sylvia. Jay is embarrassed to learn that Brian doesn't know how to drive and ignores Mike's insistence that he be the one to teach him. Sylvia helps Nicole get a full Jersey girl makeover, upsetting Kay who feels excluded. When Jay lies about having a heart attack to motivate him, Brian drives off and Mike and Jay go after him. They make amends while Kay and Sylvia talk and Kay realizes that Sylvia barely speaks with Mike anymore and therefore does what she can to stay in touch with him. Brian decides he wants to learn to drive by starting with a bicycle.
4	"Bad Guy"	Victor Gonzalez	Mathew Harawitz	February 13, 2020	1BYF04	2.17
Tired of their parents' strict rules, Nicole and Brian ask for permission to move into their own apartment. Mike refuses, but then caves in and says yes as he fears being disliked. Kay has to go to Leila's school for a popcorn fundraiser, where Rita makes her stand up to Kourtney, the verbally abusive organizer. The fundraiser quickly falls apart, and Kay and Leila have to finish making the popcorn themselves. Mike tells his kids to earn $15,000 before he'll sign off on the apartment, but the effort fails and Kay steps in to ground them when they start bickering; Nicole and Brian admit that they want to be disciplined and agree to stay. Mike repays her by patching things up with Kourtney.
5	"Dating"	Jonathan Judge	Heather MacGillvray & Linda Mathious	February 20, 2020	1BYF07	2.02
Nicole starts dating Tyler, an older boy who reminds Kay of all the losers she dated in high school. Terrified that the same thing will happen to Nicole, she decides to break them up. Mike discovers that Marc has become unusually attracted to a painting in the local museum. His son tells him to talk to the painting, which allows Mike to vent about how he doesn't understand his children and wishes they were normal. Kay and Nicole argue about what's good for her, and Nicole insults her mother, for which she gets grounded. The next day, Kay learns that Tyler did in fact cheat on Nicole, and helps her get some closure by taking both of her daughters to throw toilet paper at his house.
6	"Bullying"	Betsy Thomas	Lon Zimmet	February 27, 2020	1BYF06	2.47
Marc is disciplined for bullying his homeroom teacher, so Mike and Kay apply to a local charter school thinking it would be more suitable for him. However, the school administrator, Dr. Walker, refuses to admit Marc because Kay bullied him in high school. Kay invites him for dinner to smooth things over, but realizes that not only is she unwilling to apologize, her own children are now emulating the same bullying behavior. When Walker demands Kay make a humiliating apology and insults her, Marc and his siblings stand up for their mother and drive him off. Marc informs his parents that he will apologize to his teacher to prove he can be a better person.
7	"Failing"	Michael McDonald	Seth Raab & Nicholas Darrow	March 5, 2020	1BYF03	2.01
Irwin warns Mike and Kay that Nicole, a perfectionist who has never failed at anything, is unprepared for when she inevitably fails in life. In response, they decide to enter her into the casino's beauty pageant, figuring there's no way she can win. Nicole does win, however, to her dismay as she wanted to lose. Kay and Mike use the opportunity to teach her that failure can in fact be good, since losers get to do things "winners" can't. Brian agrees to play with Leila only because he thinks doing so will help him learn how to beat Marc at chess. Ultimately, he realizes he likes playing with his sister more than his constant need to outshine his siblings.
8	"Couple's Friends"	Betsy Thomas	Nicole Sun	March 12, 2020	1BYF08	1.99
Mike and Kay are left behind when Rita and Irwin throw a party for their other friends; to compensate, they decide to make new ones by befriending Beth and Sigmund, two buttoned-up parents hyper-focused on the needs of their son Atticus, Nicole and Brian's science fair partner. Kay invites her new friends to indulge in drinking and games, and when Nicole and Brian kick them out of the house for being too loud, take them to the casino. Unfortunately, Beth and Sigmund drink too much, and consequently Brian, Atticus, and Nicole lose an important competition. To fix things with their children, Mike and Kay end their new friendship and go to Rita and Irwin's party instead.
9	"Black Mold"	Victor Gonzalez	Caroline Fox & Mariah Smith	March 19, 2020	1BYF09	2.58
When the basement has to be cleaned due to a mold infestation, Mike and Kay become exceedingly cranky. Nicole and Brian get them a room at the casino for the night to relax while they talk their parents into letting them take care of the house; they quickly screw things up by accidentally feeding Marc and Leila caffeine and then have to leave the house when someone breaks in. Kay and Mike have to briefly leave their room, only to find it's been given to an elderly couple as their kids neglected to pay for it. Tired and miserable, they finally admit to each other that all they really need is some time alone, which is also ruined when their kids suddenly show up out of nowhere.
10	"Royal Rumble"	Anthony Rich	Carson Brand & Hannah Levitan	March 26, 2020	1BYF10	2.38
Nicole and Brian force their parents to confess that they've been lying to Leila for years by telling her that she and Marc have the same birthday when in fact, he's older. To make things right, Kay and Mike decide to throw a special make-up party for Leila with a theme of her choosing, but secretly, both of them try to pick a theme for her. Rita and Irwin learn that Mike's will gives them custody of his kids. To avoid that, they try to change the will so Kay's cousin Sebastian is the guardian instead. At Leila's party, Sebastian refuses to take the kids owing to their "weirdness"; Rita and Irwin defend them and decide they will honor Mike's wishes. Leila tells her parents the truth; she likes sharing a birthday with Marc. After the party ends, while alone with Irwin, Leila reveals to him the post-impressionist piece that she had been working on, indicating that she is really an artistic prodigy, as well as implying that she possesses a genius-level IQ. She has been hiding her talents from Mike and Kay by pretending to be dumb. She threatens Irwin to keep her hidden talent a secret, in order for her oblivious parents to continue treating her as their favorite, and only, normal child.

== Reception ==
=== Critical response ===
On Rotten Tomatoes, the series has an approval rating of 22% based on 9 reviews, with an average rating of 3/10. On Metacritic, it has a weighted average score of 33 out of 100 based on 4 reviews, indicating "generally unfavorable reviews".

=== Ratings ===
According to Nielsen Media Research, the series ranked 97th with an average of 3.25 million viewers for the broadcast season.

Viewership and ratings per episode of Outmatched
No.	Title	Air date	Rating/share (18–49)	Viewers (millions)
1	"Pilot"	January 23, 2020	0.7/4	3.20
2	"The Talk"	January 30, 2020	0.6/3	2.34
3	"Grandparents"	February 6, 2020	0.6	2.66
4	"Bad Guy"	February 13, 2020	0.5	2.17
5	"Dating"	February 20, 2020	0.5	2.02
6	"Bullying"	February 27, 2020	0.5	2.47
7	"Failing"	March 5, 2020	0.5	2.01
8	"Couple's Friends"	March 12, 2020	0.5	1.99
9	"Black Mold"	March 19, 2020	0.6	2.58
10	"Royal Rumble"	March 26, 2020	0.6	2.38
