= Amanda Schull =

American actress

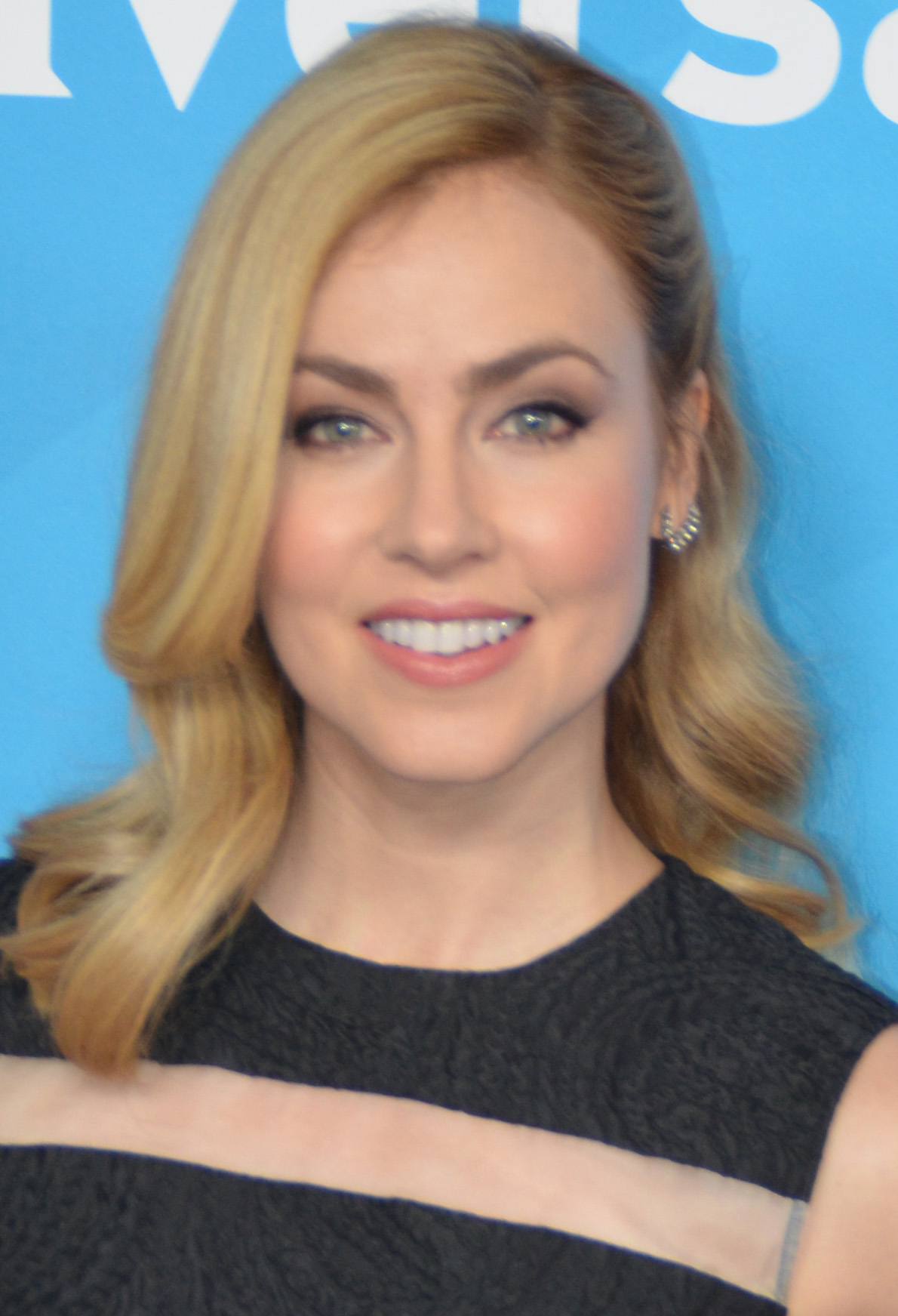
- Schull in 2015
- Born: August 26, 1978 (age 48); Honolulu, Hawaii, U.S.
- Occupation: Actress
- Years active: 1999–2006 (ballet); 2000–present (acting)
- Spouse: George Wilson
- Children: 1

Amanda Schull (born August 26, 1978) is an American actress and former professional ballet dancer. She is known for her lead role in the 2000 film Center Stage, and for her recurring roles on the American television series One Tree Hill and Pretty Little Liars. She starred as Dr. Cassandra Railly in the Syfy television series 12 Monkeys, and played a recurring role on the USA Network television series Suits before being promoted to series regular for the show's eighth and ninth seasons.

== Early life ==
Schull was born on August 26, 1978 in Honolulu, Hawaii, the daughter of Susan Schull, the current president of Ballet Hawaii, and is one of three children. She attended Punahou School, and trained at Hawaii State Ballet under the instruction of John Landovsky.

Schull was offered a scholarship to Indiana University Bloomington for ballet, and attended at age 17. While at Indiana University, she joined Delta Delta Delta. During her sophomore year (as a ballet and journalism major), she attended the San Francisco Ballet School Summer Intensive. She continued her studies for an additional year on scholarship.

After Schull's year-long scholarship ended in 1999, she continued as an apprentice. After filming Center Stage, she subsequently joined SFB as a full-time member of its corps de ballet.

== Career ==
Schull was cast in the starring role of Jody Sawyer in the 2000 film Center Stage while still an apprentice with the San Francisco Ballet.

In April 2006, Schull retired from San Francisco Ballet. In May 2008 she went to Australia to film the movie adaptation of Li Cunxin's Mao's Last Dancer. In Mao's Last Dancer, released in North America in 2010, Schull has a major role as Elizabeth "Liz" Mackey, the girlfriend (and later, first wife) of Li Cunxin.

In 2009, Schull had a guest star role on the Fox TV show, Lie to Me (season 1, episode 4). The same year, she was seen in the Lifetime Movie Sorority Wars starring Lucy Hale and Courtney Thorne-Smith. She also guest starred on The CW's One Tree Hill as Sara, the spirit and memory of the deceased wife of Clay (played by Robert Buckley), and also as Clay's wannabe lover who bears a striking resemblance to Sara—Katie Ryan. She guest starred in an episode of Ghost Whisperer (Greek Tragedy) in 2009, and episode 14 of season five in Bones, in 2010. Schull recurringly appeared as Meredith, who is Aria's (Lucy Hale's character) dad's former lover, in the ABC Family series Pretty Little Liars. She also appeared in an episode of Hawaii Five-0. In March 2012, she appeared in a McDonald's commercial for the Shamrock Shake and in April she guest starred in an episode of Psych. Also in 2012 she appeared in an episode of Grimm as Lucinda, a character who resembles Cinderella, but with a twist. In February 2013 she appeared as Agent Naomi in an episode of Nikita (Black Badge). Beginning in 2013, Schull appeared in the recurring role of Katrina Bennett in USA Network's Suits. In March 2018, she was promoted to series regular for the eighth and ninth and final season of Suits.

In November 2013, Schull was cast as Cassandra Railly on the television series 12 Monkeys, based on the 1995 film of the same name. The show premiered January 16, 2015.

In September 2024, she was cast in a recurring role on the superhero series Spider-Noir.

== Personal life ==
Schull met her husband, George Wilson, while filming Mao's Last Dancer in Australia. In February 2020, Schull gave birth to the couple's first child, a son.

== Filmography ==
Film roles
Year	Title	Role	Notes
2000	Center Stage	Jody Sawyer	
2007	Women on Top	Becca King	
2009	Mao's Last Dancer	Elizabeth Mackey	
2011	J. Edgar	Anita Colby	
2016	I Am Wrath	Abbie Hill	
2017	Devil's Gate	FBI Special Agent Daria Francis	

Television roles
Year	Title	Role	Notes
2008	The Cleaner	Aileen	Episode: "Five Little Words"
2008	Cold Case	Allison 'Ally' Thurston	Episode: "Wings"
2009	Ghost Whisperer	Emily Harris	Episode: "Greek Tragedy"
2009	Lie to Me	Phoebe Headling	Episode: "Love Always"
2009	Sorority Wars	Gwen	Television film (Lifetime)
2009–2010	One Tree Hill	Sara Evans/Katie Ryan	Recurring role; 13 episodes
2010	Bones	Neviah Larkin	Episode: "The Devil in the Details"
2010–2013	Pretty Little Liars	Meredith Sorenson	Recurring role (seasons 1–3), 7 episodes
2011	Hawaii Five-0	Nicole Duncan	Episode: "He Kane Hewa' Ole"
2011	Castle	Joy Jones	Episode: "Pretty Dead"
2011	Two and a Half Men	Alicia	Episode: "Thank You for the Intercourse"
2012	Psych	Thea Summers/Dahlia Towne	Episode: "Santabarbaratown"
2012	Grimm	Lucinda Jarvis	Episode: "Happily Ever Aftermath"
2012	The Mentalist	Marcy Victor	Episode: "Red Rover, Red Rover"
2012	Vegas	Carol Reyes	Episode: "Money Plays"
2012	Imaginary Friend	Brittany	Television film (Lifetime)
2013	Hunt for the Labrynth Killer	Shelby Cook	Television film (Lifetime)
2013	The Arrangement	Melody	Television film (USA)
2013–2019	Suits	Katrina Bennett	Recurring role (seasons 2–7); main role (seasons 8–9)
2013	Nikita	Naomi Ceaver	Episode: "Black Badge"
2014	Suburgatory	Linda	Episode: "The Ballad of Piggy Duckworth"
2014	Betrayed	Julie	Television film
2015–2018	12 Monkeys	Dr. Cassandra Railly	Main role
2016	Murder in the First	Melissa Danson	Recurring role (season 3), six episodes
2018	Love, Once and Always	Lucy	Television film (Hallmark)
2019	Romance Retreat	Dana Willingham	Television film
2020	MacGyver	Emilia West	Episode: "Right + Wrong + Both + Neither"
2020	Project Christmas Wish	Lucy	Television film (Hallmark)
2021	One Summer	Lizzie Armstrong	Television film (Hallmark)
2022	NCIS	Kay Barlowe	Episode: "Pledge of Allegiance"
2022	Marry Go Round	Abby	Television film (Hallmark)
2022	The Recruit	Cora	Episodes: "Y.D.E.K.W.Y.D.", "I.Y.D.I.A.A.C."
2023	9-1-1: Lone Star	Rose Casey	Recurring role (season 4), 5 episodes
2023	The Blessing Bracelet	Dawn Spencer	Television film (Hallmark)
2024	Family Practice Mysteries: Coming Home	Dr. Rachel Hunt	Television film (Hallmark)
2026	The Pitt	Gretchen Williams	Episode: 9:00 A.M.
2026	Spider-Noir	Ruby J. Williams	Recurring role
2026	'Tis the Season for Setups	Lexi	Television film (Hallmark)
