= Nancy Drew (2002 film) =

2002 film by James Frawley

- Genre: Mystery; Drama; Crime
- Based on: Nancy Drew by Carolyn Keene
- Written by: Ami Canaan Mann
- Directed by: James Frawley
- Starring: Maggie Lawson; Jill Ritchie; Lauren Birkell; Marieh Delfino; Charlie Finn; Heath Freeman; James Avery; Brett Cullen
- Theme music composer: Richard Marvin
- Country of origin: United States
- Original language: English

Production
- Executive producers: Lawrence Bender; Kevin Kelly Brown; James Frawley
- Producers: Hans Proppe; Ami Canaan Mann
- Cinematography: James Chressanthis
- Editors: Micky Blythe; Scott Vickrey
- Running time: 87 minutes
- Production companies: Touchstone Television; Bender Brown Productions

Original release
- Network: ABC
- Release: December 15, 2002

Nancy Drew is a 2002 American television film directed by James Frawley and written by Ami Canaan Mann. It stars Maggie Lawson as teen sleuth Nancy Drew, who heads off to college and finds yet another mystery to solve. The film first aired on December 15, 2002, on ABC.

== Plot ==
Nancy Drew begins college with her two best friends, Bess Marvin and George Fayne, at River Heights University. After the star football player goes into a coma, Nancy investigates, finding a campus-wide conspiracy and a fraternity's drug use.

== Cast ==
- Maggie Lawson as Nancy Drew
- Jill Ritchie as Bess Marvin
- Lauren Birkell as George Fayne
- Marieh Delfino as Christina "Teeny" Timkins
- Charlie Finn as Hank Luckman
- Heath Freeman as Det. Patrick Daly
- James Avery as Prof. Duke Shifflin
- Brett Cullen as Carson Drew
- Jenny O'Hara as Hannah Gruen
- Nick Stabile as Ned Nickerson
- Brian White as Franklin "Sweet Money" Sanderson
- Kevin Tighe as Coach Jeffries
- Sabine Singh as Allison Price
- Michelle Morgan as Jaclyn Calberson
- Dale Midkiff as Jimbo Mitchell
- Hoku as Bitsy
- Joanna Canton as Sue

== Production ==
The pilot was ordered by ABC in January 2002, in contention for the 2002-03 television season. Production for the pilot began in Los Angeles on March 11, and was finished within the month. In May, ABC announced it wouldn't include Nancy Drew on the fall 2002 schedule, instead deciding to air it as a part of The Wonderful World of Walt Disney, to see how it would do for a possible mid-season replacement. In anticipation of a pickup, ABC ordered six additional scripts, and put the actors under contract for a Spring 2003 premiere. Despite this, ABC decided in January 2003 to not pick it up.

Lawson was the first to be cast in early February 2002. Actresses Christine Lakin and Rachel McAdams also auditioned for the title role. The pilot was the first audition for McAdams, who later stated losing the role helped get her a leading role in The Hot Chick. Ritchie, Birkell, Delfino, Finn, Freeman, and Cullen were all cast in late February, while Avery was not cast until March. The film was dedicated to the original author of the Nancy Drew books, Mildred Wirt Benson. Wirt ghostwrote the series under the pseudonym Carolyn Keene, from 1930 to 1953; she wrote 23 of the first 30 Nancy Drew books. Wirt had died in May 2002.

The songs "Analyze", "Fade into You", and "I Tried to Rock You But You Only Roll" were used in the film.

== Broadcast ==
Originally scheduled to air Sunday, October 20, 2002, the film aired on ABC on Sunday, December 15, 2002, as a part of The Wonderful World of Disney. It was watched by 7.5 million people, placing in third for its time slot.

== Reception ==
Laura Fries, of Variety, states, "Nancy Drew is off her game. The plucky heroine from the books of Mildred Wirt Benson, aka Caroline Keene, just doesn't have the same relevance she once did, and while ABC's updated version for the Wonderful World of Disney is a slick, earnest effort, it's way out of place."

Nancy Drew was nominated for a 2003 Prism Award in the category "Movie or Miniseries for Television."
