= Boys Life 3 =

- Film poster
- Directed by: Gregory Cooke; David Fourier
- Release date: 2000
- Running time: 79 minutes
- Countries: United States; France
- Languages: English; French
- Box office: $208,538

Boys Life 3 is a compilation of five short films that deal with coming-out and the trials and tribulations of being gay.

== Premises ==
- Inside Out (1996, directed by Jason Gould; starring Alexis Arquette and Elliott Gould)
- Just One Time (1998, directed by Lane Janger; starring Guillermo Díaz, Jennifer Esposito, Joelle Carter): A man wants his girlfriend to have a sexual relationship with another girl, just one time.
- Hitch (2000, directed by Bradley Rust Gray, starring Jason Herman, Drew Wood): Two friends on a road-trip: one is gay, the other straight. The former gets attracted to the latter.
- Majorettes in Space (French: Des majorettes dans l'espace, 1996, directed by David Fourier, starring Elise Laurent, Jean-Marc Delacruz, Olivier Laville): Two male Russian cosmonauts, one of whom has a fetish for majorettes, are in space without condoms. A young heterosexual couple have sex outdoors. Pope John Paul II is passionate about airports but enforces the sexually restrictive teachings of the Catholic Church. Vincent, a young gay man, is dying of AIDS.
- $30 (1999, directed by Gregory Cooke, starring Sara Gilbert, Erik MacArthur, Gregory Itzin): A father buys his closeted son a night with a prostitute.

== See also ==
- List of American films of 2000
- Boys Life
- Boys Life 2
- Boys Life 4: Four Play
