= Michael Saucedo =

American actor (born 1970)

- Born: July 11, 1970 (age 55) (United States) Los Angeles, California, U.S.
- Occupation: Actor
- Years active: 1982–present
- Spouse: Rebecca Herbst (m. 2001)
- Children: 4

Michael Saucedo (born July 11, 1970) is an American actor best known for his role on the soap opera General Hospital from 1999 until 2001, and he briefly returned in 2013 and 2014. He is also a musician and published author known for the "Liberty Strong" series.

== Personal life ==
He is of Mexican and Irish descent. After his parents divorced, Saucedo was raised by his mother. Saucedo has one brother and six half-siblings. They moved from Los Angeles to Grants Pass, Oregon, where he attended high school and was elected student body president. He joined garage bands in high school and showed no interest in acting. Saucedo attended Carleton College in Northfield, Minnesota and attained a B.A. in African-American studies.

After graduation, not knowing what to do with his life, he decided to act and returned to Los Angeles. He married General Hospital star Rebecca Herbst (who currently plays Elizabeth Webber) in June 2001. They have three children: Ethan Riley (born October 31, 2001), Ella Bailey (born April 12, 2004), and Emerson Truett (born August 9, 2010). He also has a son from a previous relationship, Elijah Saucedo (born October 5, 1996).

== Career ==
He began acting as a child in commercials, including one for Band-Aid. During high school, he became involved with garage bands, and only went back to acting after college. From 1999-2001, Saucedo was a cast member of General Hospital as Juan Santiago.

== Filmography ==
Year	Film	Role	Notes
1982	St. Elsewhere	Paco	Episode: "Samuels and the Kid"
1983–1984	Rubik, the Amazing Cube	Carlos (voice)	
1983	Thursday's Child	Randy	
1983	Taxi	Johnny DeCeo	Episode: "Sugar Ray Nardo"
1995	Sister, Sister	Boy	Episode: "The Tutor"
1996	Must Be the Music	Eric	
1997	A River Made to Drown In	Luis	
1997	Boys Life 2	Eric	
1998	Alexandria Hotel	Unknown	
1999–2001, 2013, 2014	General Hospital	Juan Santiago	
2000	Search Party	Celebrity Contestant	Episode: "Jamaica and Jamaica"
2000	Hollywood Squares	Guest Appearance	
2000	Traffic	Desert Truck Driver	
2001	Boston Public	Lyle	Episode: "Chapter Twenty-Four"
2001	Without a Trace	Mace Williams	Episode: "Victory for Humanity"
2003	Ys: The Ark of Napishtim	Romun Soldier #2 (Voice)	VG; as Mike Saucedo
2004	SoapTalk	Himself	
2004	Soap Center	Himself	
2005	Love to Sing	Himself	
