= Boys Life 4: Four Play =

2003 film

- Film poster
- Directed by: Phillip J. Bartell; Alan Brown; Brian Sloan; Eric Mueller
- Release date: 2003
- Running time: 83 minutes
- Country: United States
- Language: English
- Box office: $53,169

Boys Life 4 is an anthology of four gay-themed short films that have been hits on the film festival circuit.

== Short films ==
- O Beautiful (2002, directed by Alan Brown), tells the aftermath of a gay bashing. Shown in split screen.
  - Jay Gillespie
  - David Rogers
- L.T.R. (2002, directed by Phillip J. Bartell), a mockumentary about a gay couple in a "long-term relationship."
  - Cole Williams
  - Weston Mueller
- Bumping Heads (2002, directed by Brian Sloan), about two men who hold different views about their relationship. (one is in love, and the other one just want to be friends).
  - Craig Chester
  - Andersen Gabrych
- This Car Up (2003, directed by Eric Mueller), about a messenger and businessman who cross paths. It uses slot machine type images to convey what both characters are thinking.
  - Michael Booth
  - Brent Doyle

== See also ==
- List of American films of 2003
- Boys Life
- Boys Life 2
- Boys Life 3
