= Boys Life (film) =

- Film poster
- Directed by: Robert Lee King; Raoul O'Connell; Brian Sloan
- Release date: 1995
- Running time: 91 minutes
- Country: United States
- Language: English

Boys Life is a compilation of three 30-minute short subject films about being gay in America.

- Pool Days (1993, directed by Brian Sloan; starring Josh Philip Weinstein and Nick Kokotakis): a high school student in finds excitement in his health club job.
- A Friend of Dorothy (1994; directed by Raoul O'Connell; starring Raoul O'Connell and Kevin McClatchy): a college freshman hopes his handsome roommate is also gay.
- The Disco Years (1991; directed by Robert Lee King; starring Matt Nolan and Russell Scott Lewis): Tom is crushed when the tennis player with whom he had a fling leaves him for a girl and joins an openly homophobic crowd.

== Boys Life 5 ==
Boys Life 5 is the fifth installment of the Boys Life series, which collects LGBT-related short films. Distributed by Strand Releasing. It is an anthology of short films about unrequited love. Director Eytan Fox returned to similar subject matter in his full-length Yossi & Jagger (2002); filmmaker Michael Burke expanded "Fishbelly White" into the full-length film The Mudge Boy (2003); and Adam Salky (director) (along with original writer David Brind) expanded and remade Dare into a full-length feature film, also entitled Dare (2009).

Boys Life 5 consists of the following segments:

- Fishbelly White

"Fishbelly White" chronicles the rural isolation of childlike Duncan (Mickey Smith), who's been lonely since his mother's death. Because his care-worn father ignores him, Duncan befriends the farm animals and adopts a chicken as his pet. Abused by his own father, an older adolescent named Perry (Jason Hayes) takes a shine to the outcast. Proclaiming they aren't gay, Duncan and Perry suppress a mutual attraction that would outrage Perry's macho friends. Directed by Michael Burke.

- Late Summer (2001; Director/Writer: David Ottenhouse)

"Late Summer" deals with the sort of unspecified childhood crush that both gays and straights have experienced. After his parents die in a car crash, Adam goes to live with an aunt and uncle; Adam's popular cousin Josh (Chris Nee) takes him under his wing. Responding to this all-American teen's guidance, the sheltered Adam learns how to skateboard and use a still-camera. Frozen in time, one picture celebrates how Josh lives on in his younger cousin's heart. Directed by David Ottenhouse.

- Time Off

"Time Off" offers viewers a tour of duty with Israeli soldiers during the First Lebanon War, in 1982. In a bivouac, sensitive Yonatan (Hanoch Re'im) wonders why gung-ho Lieutenant Erez (Gil Frank) picks on him. On leave in the city, Yonatan discovers the answer, when he wanders into a known gay pick-up spot. Directed by Eytan Fox.

- Dare (2005; Director/Writer: Adam Salky/David Brind)

In "Dare," Ben (Adam Fleming), a teenage techie, shines a spotlight on Johnny (Michael Cassidy), a jock stumbling through the lead in the school play. Keeping his adoration a secret, the backstage crewmember offers to run lines with the athlete. At Johnny's house, Ben drinks and jokes provocatively with his crush. After some good-natured teasing, the two teens take a dip in the pool. An exchange of confidences weaves a spell broken by the intrusion of classmates.

== Boys Life 6 ==
Boys Life 6 is the sixth installment of the Boys Life series, which collects LGBT-related short films. Distributed by Strand Releasing, Boys Life 6 consists of the following segments:

- Bugcrush
- Doorman
- Davy & Stu
- Heartland

== See also ==
- List of American films of 1995
- Boys Life 2
- Boys Life 3
- Boys Life 4: Four Play
