= Boys Life 2 =

1997 American short films

- Film poster
- Directed by: Mark Christopher; Nickolas Perry; Tom DeCerchio; Tom Donaghy
- Starring: Milo Ventimiglia; Vincent D'Onofrio; Mary Beth Hurt
- Release date: 1997
- Running time: 84 minutes
- Country: United States
- Language: English
- Box office: $532,654

Boys Life 2 is a compilation of four short films about being gay in America, released in 1997.

- Must Be the Music (1996; directed by Nickolas Perry) offers a frank depiction of urban gay youth.
- Nunzio's Second Cousin (1994; directed by Tom DeCerchio) finds a gay policeman getting even with homophobic people.
- Alkali, Iowa (1995; directed by Mark Christopher) chronicles a Midwestern teenaged gay male who unearths his dead father's secret.
- The Dadshuttle (1996; directed by Tom Donaghy) centers on the communication breakdown between a father and his son, who is gay.

A limited edition DVD also included a fifth segment, Trevor, starring Brett Barsky.

== Partial cast ==
- Must Be the Music
  - Milo Ventimiglia
- Nunzio's Second Cousin
  - Vincent D'Onofrio
  - Eileen Brennan
  - Seth Green
- Alcali, Iowa
  - J. D. Cerna
  - Mary Beth Hurt
- The Dadshuttle
  - Matt McGrath
  - Peter Maloney

== See also ==
- List of American films of 1997
- Boys Life
- Boys Life 3
- Boys Life 4: Four Play
