= Boys Life (Boston band) =

Band from Massachusetts, US

- Origin: Malden, Massachusetts, United States
- Years active: 1979–1985
- Past members: John Surette, Joe McCormack, Robert Weiner, Chris George, Ed Weston, Neal Sugarman

Boys Life was a band from Malden, Massachusetts. Band members included John Surette, Joe McCormack, Robert Weiner, Chris George, Ed Weston and Neal Sugarman. The band's name was based on Boys' Life magazine.

The band existed from 1979 to 1985. They have a short discography.
