= Winter Break (2003 film) =

2003 American comedy-drama film by Marni Banack

Winter Break, also released as Snow Job, is a 2003 American comedy-drama film by Marni Banack featuring Milo Ventimiglia and Eddie Kaye Thomas. The film has been described as resembling American Pie, which also features Thomas in a leading role.
