= List of A Million Little Things episodes =

A Million Little Things is an American family drama television series created by DJ Nash for ABC. Produced by ABC Signature and Kapital Entertainment, it features an ensemble cast including David Giuntoli, Grace Park, Romany Malco, Christina Moses, Allison Miller, James Roday Rodriguez, Stéphanie Szostak, Tristan Byon, and Lizzy Greene. The series aired from September 26, 2018 until May 3, 2023, across five seasons and 87 episodes.

During the course of the series, 87 episodes of A Million Little Things aired, between September 26, 2018, and May 3, 2023.

== Series overview ==
Season	Episodes	Originally released	
Season	Episodes	First released	Last released
1	17	September 26, 2018	February 28, 2019
2	19	September 26, 2019	March 26, 2020
3	18	November 19, 2020	June 9, 2021
4	20	September 22, 2021	May 18, 2022
5	13	February 8, 2023	May 3, 2023

== Episodes ==
=== Season 1 (2018–19) ===
No. overall	No. in season	Title	Directed by	Written by	Original release date	U.S. viewers (millions)
1	1	"Pilot"	James Griffiths	DJ Nash	September 26, 2018	5.07
After completing negotiations for a deal on the phone, Jon goes out onto the balcony of his office, leaves his phone and an envelope on the table, and calmly steps over the edge to his death. Meanwhile, Gary is at the doctor's for a check-up to see if his breast cancer is still in remission. When Eddie gets the call, he is packing a suitcase and about to leave his workaholic wife Katherine for his lover. Rome has just stuffed a handful of pills in his mouth when he gets the call and spits them out. Gary brings Maggie from his cancer support group to the funeral and wake, where she gets on well with Delilah and Regina. The four men met when trapped in an elevator, and since they were all Boston Bruins fans, Jon bought them season tickets every year. They go to the next game together to honor Jon and try to figure out why he did it. Rome admits he has been depressed and the others insist he get help. Jon's final deal was a subsidized lease for Regina so that she can open a restaurant, instead of catering from her kitchen. Delilah is worried that Jon killed himself because of her affair with Eddie and ends it.
2	2	"Band Of Dads"	James Griffiths	DJ Nash	October 3, 2018	3.79
Gary and Maggie continue spending time together. Her ex turns up and says he's worried because she left suddenly when her cancer returned. Maggie tells him she doesn't want more chemotherapy. Sophie is upset because she and Jon were entered in a father-daughter dance recital and it feels like her father abandoned her. The guys resolve to step up and be dads for Jon's children. Sophie picks Eddie to dance with her. Rome talks to Maggie about his suicide attempt. Ashley tells Delilah that Jon added her to the restaurant lease because he thought it was time she returned to work after raising their kids. In Jon's nightstand, Delilah finds the necklace Eddie lost in her car, and returns it to him. Eddie, feeling guilty, pulls out of the recital dance. Since Jon had asked Rome to help him with the dance steps in preparation, Rome and Sophie dance well. Ashley finds a hidden life insurance policy naming Gary, Eddie, Rome, and Barbara Morgan as beneficiaries. Eddie finally listens to a voicemail that Jon left the day he died (while Eddie was having sex with Delilah); Jon says "love each other".
3	3	"Save the Date"	Richard J. Lewis	DJ Nash & David Marshall Grant	October 10, 2018	3.66
It's Gary's 35th birthday; he has a passionate night with Maggie until Jon's text reminder. Maggie, mad at Gary for prying, goes running and encounters Rome, who asks her to be his confidante. Jon's Boston Bruins fantasy camp plan for himself and the guys is reconsidered by the others. When they decide to go, Eddie stops by his house for his "lucky skates", returning unexpectedly for his forgotten cellphone, which leads to the revelation that Katherine's found out about Eddie's affair with Delilah. As the tryst's gossip quickly spreads, Delilah feels distraught with guilt. At fantasy camp, high tensions between Gary and Eddie lead to a hockey rink fight. Although Eddie apologizes, all is not forgiven. Later, Eddie tells his wife the affair is over, but Katherine is still infuriated. As the day ends, Delilah explains to Gary that while Jon was there for everyone. Eventually, she just felt forgotten leading to her and Eddie's. The episode closes with Delilah & Gary continuing their chat in her kitchen where she presents him with the cake that Jon had ordered for Gary's birthday before his passing. Delilah places and lights 5 candles on the cake. Gary blows out the candles as the scene fades to black.
4	4	"Friday Night Dinner"	J. Miller Tobin	Julia Cohen	October 17, 2018	3.33
Delilah hides a pizza peel Jon used, unable to deal with the memories and guilt. Sophie notices and accuses her mom of trying to erase her dad's legacy from their lives. Gary and Rome hatch a plan to get Delilah and Regina in the restaurant during renovations. Regina is still furious at Delilah over the affair, but even more that Delilah didn't share that Jon was distant the past two years. Eddie revisits his old bar, flashing back to nine years ago when Jon notices Eddie's drinking problem and has him kick the habit. Sophie visits Eddie and Katherine's house for an impromptu guitar lesson and a talk. Maggie is informed that her cancer is aggressively returning and has three to six months to live if no treatment. After Rome's meeting with Maggie, he confesses to Regina that he's unhappy with his job. Regina visits Delilah and apologizes for not seeing her pain earlier and offers to help her get Pizza Night back on track. After dropping Sophie off at her house, Eddie and Katherine give in to their son's request to stay for dinner. Gary and Eddie make amends, and Rome announces that he quit his job to make his movie. Eating pizza, they all toast Jon.
5	5	"The Game of Your Life"	James Griffiths	Jordan Hawley	October 24, 2018	3.49
Gary takes Maggie out on a romantic day of activities, including hot-air ballooning. Knowing that Maggie's cancer has returned, Gary begs her to go through with chemotherapy and pledges to be by her side, but she refuses, so Gary and Maggie play one-on-one basketball to determine her fate. Sophie is suspended from school for punching a classmate who has said hurtful things about Jon, so Delilah comes up with a plan to help get Sophie's aggression out in a positive manner. Rome attends his first therapy session and receives a prescription for his depression. Meanwhile, Theo plays a tree in a school play. Despite Eddie pulling off a miracle to delay the play so that Katherine has time to get there, she tells Eddie that she's divorcing him in the aftermath of his recent affair, and Eddie winds up on Gary's couch. Later, the guys find a used pregnancy test, and Rome thinks Regina is pregnant. Later, Regina tells Rome that the test belongs to Delilah.
6	6	"Unexpected"	Nzingha Stewart	DJ Nash & Ashley Sims	October 31, 2018	3.31
The friends get together at Rome and Regina's home for game night, which comes to a grinding halt with questions about Delilah's pregnancy, leaving Eddie with more regrets about his affair. Eddie lands a music gig at the bar, but is asked to stay with his son Theo while Katherine goes on a business trip; Gary and Maggie agree to babysit. Ashley visits a still-rattled Delilah while keeping Jon's insurance policy a secret. Shortly thereafter, Delilah asks Gary to bring her to the OBGYN to terminate her pregnancy. Rome and Regina set their sights on opening a new restaurant, but Regina's mom Shelley shows up and meddles into their affairs. Later, Regina finds Rome's suicide note written the day of Jon's death. Rome tells his wife that while he has a happy life, he still feels unhappy, leading Regina to console him. Later, Eddie has jitters as he's never performed sober before and calls Gary for advice. After restoring his confidence thanks to Theo, Eddie performs for his friends and patrons. Backstage after the concert, Delilah tells Eddie that she and Jon weren't sleeping together and that the baby is his.
7	7	"I Dare You"	James Griffiths	David Marshall Grant	November 7, 2018	3.28
Rome wakes up with stomach pains and asks Maggie if it has to do with the antidepressants. After falling over in pain, Regina panics and takes him to the hospital. While she struggles to cope with the possibility of an overdose, Gary and Eddie make sure Rome drinks a charcoal-based substance to clear his stomach. Ultimately, the source of his pain is a small kidney stone, which he passes. Delilah feels anxious about her ultrasound, and Eddie offers to take her. Gary and Maggie take turns playing a game of dare, including singing their rendition of Elton John's "I'm Still Standing" at a restaurant. Gary then tries once more to get Maggie to get chemo, but she's upset with him. Eddie learns that an up-and-coming singer wants to use his song "Unexpected" in his album. Eddie reluctantly agrees, but passes on his advice to put the bottle down. Later, Danny, Delilah and Jon's son, has a date with a boy from school and asks Gary's advice. Meanwhile, Regina is still mad that everyone knew about Rome's depression except her, so the two make a fresh start by role-playing a first-date.
8	8	"Fight or Flight"	Ami Canaan Mann	Tawnya Bhattacharya & Ali Laventhol	November 28, 2018	3.47
Maggie has a recurring nightmare of herself in a plane with a young pilot named Chad who is drinking some booze as they fly in turbulence. Meanwhile, Gary helps Eddie and his son Theo find a new apartment, however Eddie is hesitant to commit to a one-year lease. Gina and Delilah set up for the grand opening, but later congregate to discuss with their group what to do since Gary and Maggie's breakup. They try to get Maggie to open up, but she pushes back, and they ultimately blame Gary. Days later, Maggie finally reveals the reason for the breakup – she is dying. Meanwhile, Gary travels to Chicago for some advice from an unlikely source – Maggie's ex Tom. Later, a tasting party commences at the new restaurant. Gary returns and joins in, but then sees Maggie and the two have another fight over trying to get chemo treatment for her. After Gary angrily walks out, he sleeps with Ashley. As Gina drives Maggie home, it is revealed that Chad was Maggie's brother who died in a car crash resulting from a DUI. Maggie has another dizzy spell followed by the same recurring nightmare, which this time has a happy ending.
9	9	"Perspective"	Chris Koch	DJ Nash & Jonathan Caren	December 5, 2018	3.17
At the one-year anniversary of Gary beating breast cancer, he has flashbacks remembering Jon as his moral support during chemotherapy. Meanwhile, Maggie creates a bucket list of things to do before she dies of cancer. Delilah wishes she could travel back two years to when Jon become distant and shut her out. Eddie's former bandmate stops by to ask him to rejoin the group, but Eddie is hesitant due to taking care of Theo. Later, he finds out that Katherine's new love interest Hunter picks up the slack as Katherine struggles to find a babysitter while working long hours. Rome's dad visits him and Gina to fix their broken sink. He learns about Rome's depression and how he is getting help. Gary meets with Ashley to discuss whether Jon planned his suicide or if he had financial problems. Ashley brings Gary to a surprise "You're Cancer Free" party with all the friends. What was to be a joyous moment turns uncomfortable as Gary lashes out and destroys the painting Jon hung up for Gary because Jon fought so hard to keep him alive only to end his own life. Days later, Maggie texts Gary as she finally gets chemo.
10	10	"Christmas Wishlist"	Nina Lopez Corrado	Jordan Hawley & Chris Erric Maddox	December 12, 2018	3.37
The friends meet at the Dixon house to make the Christmas season easier on the family following Jon's death. Sophie has a flashback of her dad wearing a Santa suit, causing her to be upset. Eddie helps her through it, and they end up playing guitar together. Gary sees Ashley on the phone with a banker. He hopes for some answers about the day of Jon's suicide, but Ashley tells him to make sure his family has a good time. Gina hopes to be intimate with Rome who admits his sex drive is low due to his meds. Later, when Maggie and Gary are out, she only reveals that she has begun chemo after she vomits in his car. Meanwhile, Eddie takes Delilah to the hospital after a fall. Sophie follows and learns that her mother is pregnant. Back at the house, Sophie, in a much better mood, teams up with Eddie for a yuletide concert. Despite Ashley's pleas to the bankers, Delilah is served an eviction notice. The next day, Eddie leaves on a bus tour with the band. Later, Gary hangs up Jon's repaired painting for Maggie and sits with her during chemo. Ashley flashes back to a time with Jon at his apartment.
11	11	"Secrets and Lies"	James Griffiths	Julia Cohen & Dante Russo	January 17, 2019	5.22
Days before his death, Jon made a video of himself apologizing to Barbara for abandoning her. In the present day, Delilah asks attorney Katherine's help regarding the bank's foreclosure on her house; apparently Jon leveraged his family's home against a larger commercial loan, and Delilah signed off on it – not knowing what the papers were. Meanwhile, the gang preps for a road race to benefit suicide-prevention efforts, but Gary thinks Maggie should sit it out due to the side-effects of her chemotherapy. Katherine lets Delilah know that she got a 60-day extension on her eviction, but at a cost of $18 million; Gary, befuddled by Jon's actions does not believe he would leave his family financially stranded. Investigating past financial transactions, Delilah and Katherine try to learn about Winthrop Holdings, the shell company that Jon set up. While the two are obtaining copies of bank documents, Ashley is at the teller desk, closing out the "Rutledge account" with a check made out to her. Faced with the grim news that Gina's restaurant may never open, thanks to the financial woes attached to the property, Rome offers to go back to making commercials, through support from his family.
12	12	"The Day Before..."	Silver Tree	Ashley Sims	January 24, 2019	5.41
On the day before Jon's suicide: Maggie moves to Boston from Chicago in response to learning that her cancer has aggressively returned after six months in remission. Jon receives a voicemail from Jeri (played by Constance Zimmer) demanding that he stop calling her. The four guys play basketball, ripping on Gary for dating a series of women then dumping them for no reason. Jon confides in Ashley that a new subway station vote is not going to happen, and therefore their business is likely going under. Rome wins a pitch to make a Super Bowl LIII commercial and he is happy about it until he isn't. Gary feeds a stray dog and names it Colin, and then is dismayed to learn that the animal shelter will euthanize him if not adopted in two weeks. As Gary waits for his screening results, he calls to adopt Colin. On the day of the tragic event, Jon leaves for work while Delilah and Eddie discuss informing their spouses about their affair. In Jon's final moments, he dismisses Ashley, finishes his call, leaves a voicemail message for Eddie to "love each other", then jumps off the balcony, while Ashley opens mail containing an airline ticket to Spain from Jon.
13	13	"Twelve Seconds"	James Griffiths	DJ Nash	January 31, 2019	5.29
It turns out that Jeri was a business partner of Jon's before she argued with him in her last phone call with him. Upon hearing of Jon's subsequent suicide, Jeri feels guilty that she inadvertently contributed to his despair, so she works tirelessly with Ashley to get the mass transit vote back on the table. At the city council meeting, Jeri assures Delilah that the rescheduled vote will come out in her favor. Not willing to take that risk, Delilah sells the property to an interested buyer minutes before the vote takes place. By a close vote, the council ultimately decides not to create a new subway stop near Jon's old apartment (and other property holdings).
14	14	"Someday"	Richard J. Lewis	David Marshall Grant	February 7, 2019	5.25
Eddie returns home from his musical tour with zero hook-ups. Regina prepares to open her own restaurant. Delilah secures help from a food-and-beverage expert Andrew who procures a liquor license and bartending staff. The day before the grand opening, Regina finds out that the restaurant funding came from her Uncle Neil (not from her mom), leading Regina to reject the money. Rome asks Maggie to talk to his despondent wife, who shares how she was sexually assaulted by her uncle at age 12. Meanwhile, Gary unsuccessfully tries to track down Barbara Morgan, even with the help of a private investigator. The morning after her breakdown, Regina plans to confront her uncle, but he dies at the hospital before she arrives. There, she and her mom have a fraught conversation regarding Neil's past, where it is revealed that Shelley was also sexually assaulted by (her brother) Neil. Despite some rough beginnings, Regina's restaurant opens to a happy crowd, and the gang helps out with service. Later, the woman who lives at Barbara's old residence watches a video Jon made, which was sent on a digital memory chip in an envelope addressed to Barbara Morgan.
15	15	"The Rock"	James Griffiths	Jordan Hawley & Tucker Cawley	February 14, 2019	4.93
Maggie wraps up her chemotherapy and has an 80% chance of doing well. Ahead of her surgery, she asks Gary to take her to Plymouth Rock. Katherine and Eddie make progress on their divorce via mediation. It goes well until Theo's guardianship is brought up, which prompts Katherine to leave since Jon and Delilah were the previous guardians. Later, she is in an auto accident and is taken to the hospital. As Katherine recovers, she reflects on how close she came to not seeing her son again. Meanwhile, Rome's father shows up at Rome and Regina's unannounced, letting him know Rome's brother Omar will be staying over, much to Rome's dismay.
16	16	"The Rosary"	Richard J. Lewis	Story by : Tawnya Bhattacharya & Ali Laventhol; Teleplay by : Julia Cohen	February 21, 2019	5.25
The mystery woman (possibly Barbara Morgan) creepily watches the Dixon house. She talks her way inside by making up a story about having met Sophie at the 5K race a few weeks back. At the hospital, after Maggie goes to the operating room, Gary rushes home to get her mother's rosary. On the way back, a woman steals the hospital parking spot that Gary was about to take, and they argue. It turns out that the woman is Maggie's mother Patricia. Even though Gary later apologizes, Patricia does not accept him until they are in the hospital chapel when Patricia finally breaks down, fearing she will lose Maggie. The next morning, they stand beside Maggie as she wakes up. Meanwhile, Rome misplaces his finished screenplay at the hospital; he eventually finds it in the hands of teenager PJ, who loves it because he relates to the storyline. Shortly thereafter, Rome calls the National Suicide Prevention Lifeline to volunteer. Regina gets a positive newspaper review of her restaurant but is dismayed that it focuses on investor Andrew and gives her very little recognition. As Eddie and Katherine prepare to sign the divorce papers, Theo has a night terror.
17	17	"Goodbye"	James Griffiths	DJ Nash	February 28, 2019	5.26
After rekindling a spark with Katherine and deciding not to divorce, Eddie realizes that they cannot keep any secrets or lies between them. Delilah wants to let go of the Barbara Morgan mystery, but Sophie says the baby might want answers someday. So, Delilah returns to the woman she and Gary visited before and learns that she is Barbara. Barbara shows Delilah the video Jon made and tells her that she dated Jon's roommate Dave. She explains to Delilah that 17 years ago Jon and Dave bought tickets for a flight leaving Logan International Airport on September 11, 2001. However, Jon missed the flight, which as it turns out was one of the two that took down the World Trade Center towers. Jon had survivor's guilt and stopped talking to Barbara after learning she was pregnant. Delilah flashed back to when she met Jon in the airport moments later. When Delilah tells her friends the story, Maggie says that it was likely the totality of Jon's issues – including his financial problems and grief over Dave – that led him to end his life. Later, Maggie learns she is cancer-free which prompts tears of joy from Gary and laughter from Maggie. After helping Maggie move into his home, Gary visits Jon's grave for the proper goodbye the two friends never got.

=== Season 2 (2019–20) ===
No. overall	No. in season	Title	Directed by	Written by	Original release date	U.S. viewers (millions)
18	1	"Coming Home"	Nina Lopez-Corrado	DJ Nash	September 26, 2019	4.99
As Delilah is about to give birth, Eddie confesses to Katherine that he is the father of Delilah's baby. She instructs him to go to the hospital to at least be there for the birth before taking off to her mother's. Gary, Maggie, and the rest of the gang get the call that Delilah is in labour. While trying to purchase the crib they forgot about, Gary confronts Eddie about him being the father of Delilah's baby, while Rome is dumbstruck about Jon's vasectomy he never knew about. Rome confesses to Regina and Gary that he wants kids. Later, at the Dixons, everyone gathers together to celebrate the newly named baby Charlotte Dixon and take a group picture underneath Jon's old jersey.
19	2	"Grand Canyon"	Chris Koch	DJ Nash & Geoffrey Nauffts	October 3, 2019	4.77
Maggie discovers her mother, Patricia, has left her father. P.J.'s parents fear that the trust fund money Jon left to PJ will expose their lies. PJ confides in Rome that he believes Jon is his real dad. Delilah and restaurant owner Andrew become closer, but Gina and Andrew argue over the restaurant. Eddie distracts Theo from noticing Katherine's absence.
20	3	"Mixed Signals"	Steve Robin	David Marshall Grant	October 10, 2019	4.23
Rome slyly tells PJ about the money Jon left for him. Delilah and Andrew go on a date, but decide that they are not yet ready to date. Maggie is upset that the purpose of her mother's visit was to see a much younger man, Eric, whom she brings to breakfast. Gary helps Danny prepare for an audition for a high school musical. Theo is not yet ready for his first sleepover. Gina decides to buy out Andrew, with Rome's support. Rome is pressured to change his script from a story about suicide. PJ secretly tests Jon's DNA, seeking the truth about his parents. .
21	4	"The Perfect Storm"	Nina Lopez-Corrado	Julia Cohen & Ashley Sims	October 17, 2019	4.05
Maggie's mom, Patricia, tells her that Eric has her dead brother's heart, and that she came to visit Eric during her last visit. Eddie enjoys time with his baby daughter, Charlie, when he and Rome look after her while Delilah returns to work at the restaurant. During a power outage at the restaurant, Gina invites people in from the street for a "family style" dinner. Patricia tells Gary her husband forced her to choose between Eric or their marriage. Gary becomes jealous of Eric's connection with Maggie.
22	5	"Austin"	Eric Laneuville	DJ Nash & Michelle Leibel	October 24, 2019	4.38
Eddie confronts Katherine about looking at houses and law firms in Austin. Katherine explains that she was thinking that the three of them could move to Austin as a fresh start until she realized that baby Charlie is now a part of their family. She and Eddie tour the house across the street and have sex in the walk-in closet. Maggie talks to Eric at his music store. She wants to touch his heart but he awkwardly hugs her instead. The Dixons decide that, instead of a group photo to announce the birth of baby Charlie, they will instead include their friends as part of the photo. Danny has a meltdown when he can't find his wallet, and when it is returned it is revealed he has kept Jon's driver's license to keep his dad close. Gina is upset to discover that Rome has used the time she told him she didn't want to have any kids as the storyline for a commercial he is directed.
23	6	"Unleashed"	Tessa Blake	Lauren Bachelis & Christopher Luccy	October 31, 2019	4.16
The gang rally to help look for Gary's dog, Colin, after Maggie accidentally lets him off his leash. Delilah confides in Andrew about her dilemma of telling her children about Charlie's real father, and Andrew confesses that his wife is not dead but in a coma from which she is unlikely to leave. Gary and Maggie argue over her growing closeness to Eric. Rome tries to prevent PJ and Sophie from getting too close, and tells Gina that PJ might be Jon's son. Rome finds Colin in the basement, but Gary is devastated to learn that his dog has an owner that misses him. Katherine and Delilah disagree about telling the children about Charlie's parentage.
24	7	"Ten Years"	Robert Duncan McNeill	Chris Erric Maddox & Dante Russo	November 7, 2019	4.45
Katherine and Eddie find it hard to keep up their lies about Katherine's sudden disappearance. Rome worries when Delilah remarks that PJ looks familiar. Katherine explains to Gina that she is worried keeping the secret about baby Charlie will affect Eddie's sobriety. Eddie and Delilah disagree about telling the children about Charlie. Gary decides to return his dog, Colin, to his original owner, an older woman who tells him that she still hopes for his return. Seeing how upset he is, Maggie replaces Colin with a similar dog from a shelter at the last minute. Sophie finds out her father bought her a car for the day she got her driver's license. Katherine, Eddie and Delilah fight at Theo's birthday party about telling the children about Charlie. Gina and Rome find the DNA test results for PJ, confirming that Jon is PJ's father.
25	8	"Goodnight"	Kristen Bell	Geoffrey Nauffts & Mimi Won Techentin	November 14, 2019	4.57
Rome thinks Gina should tell Delilah about PJ's paternity. Before she can she gets the news that Rome's mother has unexpectedly died of an aneurysm while at the hairdresser. His father decides that the best way to honor his wife is to go on the cruise she always wanted to take. Eddie and Katherine contemplate legal action when they find out that Delilah wants to take her kids to France for the summer and that Eddie is not listed as the father on Charlie's birth certificate. Gina finds out that Gary has lost his job, but hasn't told Maggie because he doesn't want to stand in the way of Maggie deciding to go to Oxford. PJ finds the DNA test results. Delilah runs into Mitch and finds out he is PJ's "father". She confronts Rome and Gina.
26	9	"Time Stands Still"	Nina Lopez-Corrado	DJ Nash & Michelle Leibel	November 21, 2019	4.59
Delilah convinces PJ to talk to his parents, and after an explosive argument with Mitch, Barbara reveals that his birth father is not Jon but David, Jon's best friend. Gary confronts Katherine, Eddie and Delilah over the situation with baby Charlie, telling them that he lost his job because he spent so much time helping them. Delilah finally concedes that she has to tell the truth about Charlie and names Eddie as her father on her birth certificate. Maggie and Gary argue about their commitment to each other after she finds an engagement ring that he bought her when he thought she was dying. They break up, as Maggie says she needs to figure out who she is without cancer and Gary tells her he might need to figure out who he is without Maggie. Maggie finds out she didn't get the fellowship at Oxford. Gina tells Rome she is willing to adopt a child. Delilah tells the kids about Charlie, angering Sophie who smashes all of Eddie's guitars in the shed.
27	10	"The Kiss"	Steve Robin	David Marshall Grant	January 23, 2020	4.17
Sophie acts out over the affair between Delilah and Eddie. Danny confides in Gary over his worry that his first kiss will be on stage and with a girl. Gina and Rome move forward on their adoption plans. Gina originally omits Rome's history of depression on the forms, but later revises the forms and tells him how proud she is of him for taking care of himself. Eddie tells Theo that he is an alcoholic. Maggie sees Gary on the dating app she is using. Danny has his first kiss backstage with Elliott. Maggie kisses Eric, but he breaks off the kiss and, after she has left, he takes off his shirt and reveals that he does not have a heart transplant scar.
28	11	"We're the Howards"	Stacey K. Black	Lauren Bachelis & Christopher Luccy	January 30, 2020	3.81
Gina and Rome make an introduction video for potential birth moms. Gina refuses to let Sophie into the house when she gets drunk with a friend, and tells Delilah that she and Sophie need to re-set their relationship. Gary runs into Eric at a coffee shop. Eric tries to apologize to Gary if he had anything to do with his and Maggie's breakup. Gary confronts Eric after discovering there is a wrongful death lawsuit against Eric, and in the altercation exposes Eric's unmarked chest. At Sophie's softball game, Gary and Rome fight two men who Gary believes are being racist to Rome. Gary ends up in jail, and when Maggie comes with Katherine to bail him out, they fight about Eric.
29	12	"Guilty"	Pete Chatmon	Julia Cohen & Ashley Sims	February 6, 2020	3.73
When Maggie goes to Eric's apartment to confront him over ignoring her calls, she discovers he is leaving the city. He tells Maggie that, although he feels a connection with her, he's not ready. After Maggie sees a photo of him without a scar, Eric explains that his girlfriend had received the heart, but died six years later, and that he couldn't bring himself to tell Maggie's mom about her death. He tells Maggie that he loves her and that she helped him move on from his grief but that he must now move on from Maggie. Gary decides to confront his mother, who lives in New York, about abandoning the family when he was a child. However, he realizes her abandonment had nothing to do with him when she priorities a potential investor in her acting career over dinner with her son. Rome discovers his agent has stolen and altered his script, but wrestles control back by interesting the potential lead actor in producing the original script. Delilah gets a call from a distraught Maggie. Gary shows up to comfort her and they part as friends.
30	13	"Daisy"	Nina Lopez-Corrado	Tucker Cawley & Dante Russo	February 13, 2020	3.65
Gary and Maggie run into each other at a fellow cancer patient's remission party. Maggie tells Gary she thinks they can still be friends. Rome and Gina meet Eve, a pregnant girl who wants to put her baby up for adoption, but are nervous as the father has not signed off on the adoption. However, they are resolved to adopt when Eve explains that her ex is abusive and she doesn't want him to reach her. After taking Theo to a therapist, Katherine realizes that she has put too much emphasis on being perfectly happy. Sophie begins to thaw in her attitude to Delilah after speaking to Delilah's father, who unwittingly reveals how unhappy Delilah was in her marriage when he confuses Sophie for Delilah.
31	14	"The Sleepover"	Nicole Rubio	Mimi Won Techentin & Chris Erric Maddox	February 20, 2020	3.65
After Eve sees her ex's car, Rome and Gina help her get into a shelter and Katherine helps get her a restraining order. Maggie finds out she is still free from cancer, while Gary waits anxiously for news. Danny's first boyfriend, Elliott, is moving away, so Gary chaperones their last sleepover together. Gary finds pot in Sophie's sleeping bag. After Theo storms out of Eddie's session with the younger musician, Dakota, Eddie finds out he's worried he will have a baby with Dakota too. Katherine and Eddie both talk to Theo to help him come to terms with Eddie's affair.
32	15	"The Lunch"	Richard J. Lewis	Geoffrey Nauffts & Katie Scheines	February 27, 2020	3.68
Delilah wants to talk to Sophie about the pot in her sleeping bag, but Sophie discloses instead that she wants to go on the pill. Gary and Delilah decide to go over to her boyfriend Jake's home to make sure he and Sophie are not having sex, but find that Jake has appendicitis and he is rushed to the hospital. Delilah and Sophie have a heart-to-heart while waiting on Jake's surgery, and while Sophie is being responsible about sex, she has no explanation for the pot. When Gary runs into Maggie being stood up at a first date, he tries to make her feel better by sending over a bottle of wine that he pretends was from her date. Rome blows off a lunch with his father to meet up with an actor about being in his movie. After the lunch, he discovers his father is talking to Eve's ex Derek. Derek and Eve leave together. Eddie encourages Dakota to make the music she wants to make.
33	16	"Change of Plans"	Daisy von Scherler Mayer	DJ Nash & Michelle Liebel	March 5, 2020	3.64
When Eddie's alcoholic sister decides to visit, Katherine plans for Theo to be out of the house but is unexpectedly called into work. Eddie kicks his sister out when he finds drugs on her. Gary steps in to take Theo to laser tag, where he meets a woman, Darcy, who intrigues him. Katherine quits her job when she finds out that her clients are homophobic. Eddie discovers the drugs he found were Dakota's, tells Dakota to stay away from Theo, and makes up with his sister. She comes over for a meal and meets Theo, but on the way out she implies there is a story behind a lake house they used to go to as children. Rome and Gina track Eve to a hotel, where she has been with her ex. Eve gets Derek to sign the adoption papers. After he sees the restraining order he leaves town. Maggie gets accepted to Oxford.
34	17	"One Year Later"	Rebecca Asher	David Marshall Grant & Julia Cohen	March 12, 2020	3.75
Delilah is having a dinner party to commemorate Jon's death. Sophie tells Eddie that she isn't playing guitar anymore because it makes her think of him and his lies. Gary talks to her about forgiveness. Sophie and Eddie go to Jon's grave and Sophie forgives Eddie. Maggie and Gary both admit they brought baggage to the relationship. Gina tells Maggie that Gary still loves her. Maggie tell Gina that she is leaving for Oxford. While Rome is talking to Maggie about his dad, she also tells him that she is leaving for Oxford. Gina and Delilah take the group to the apartment above the restaurant and explain that it could be Katherine's new office if she wants it. They all toast the office. Rome tells Gary that Maggie is leaving for Oxford next week.
35	18	"Mothers and Daughters"	Nina Lopez-Corrado	Tucker Cawley & Mimi Won Techentin	March 19, 2020	4.13
Eddie is consumed with his vague memory of the death of a friend, Alex. His sister takes him to the lake where it happened. His sister remembers that everyone was drinking. When Eddie never came home his sister found him soaking wet on the beach. She took him home and the next morning Alex was found drowned. Eddie doesn't remember what happened that night and his sister never tells him that she found him wet on the beach. Eddie is determined to find out the truth. Gary and his new love interest, Darcy, help Katherine with setting up her office. When they get stuck in a closet Darcy has a PTSD panic attack. Gary helps her through it and they grow closer. Gina is initially feeling weird about Eve, the birth mother, being present at Gina's baby shower. Eve and Gina reassure Rome that he will be a good father.
36	19	"'Til Death Do Us Part"	Nina Lopez-Corrado	DJ Nash	March 26, 2020	4.27
Katherine and Eddie are set to renew their vows, with Theo as best man. Before the festivities can begin, Eve goes into labor and the gang decide to move to the hospital. Before Eddie can leave, Alex's sister shows up to ask Eddie not to reopen the wound of her sister's death. Eddie heads to the lake house, where his memory is triggered and he remembers that Alex drowned when he was unable to hold onto her. Maggie tells Gary that she still cares for him and asks him to come to Oxford with her, but he tells her she only wants him now because he is happy with somebody else. Eve gives birth to a baby boy, but devastates Gina and Rome by deciding to keep the baby. Gary, feeling remorseful about his argument with Maggie, finds her at the airport to tell her he wants her to be happy and he is going to try to be happy with Darcy. Meanwhile, Eddie is sitting at a bar contemplating drinking, but decides not to drink. He calls Katherine to tell her how committed he is to their family when he is hit by a car.

=== Season 3 (2020–21) ===
No. overall	No. in season	Title	Directed by	Written by	Original release date	U.S. viewers (millions)
37	1	"Hit & Run"	Nina Lopez-Corrado	DJ Nash & Michelle Leibel	November 19, 2020	4.04
Eddie is injured in a hit and run accident. The gang, other than Maggie who is flying to Oxford, gather at the hospital. Katherine tells them why Eddie was at the lake and tells them to leave, but Gary chooses to stay. A social worker calls Rome and Gina about adopting another baby, but Gina tells Rome that she first needs to mourn the baby they didn't get. Rome reluctantly agrees. When Maggie arrives at her new place in Oxford, she mistakes the woman who opens the door for her new flatmate and counsels her to leave her boyfriend, only to discover that the boyfriend is her new flatmate, Jamie. Eddie comes out of surgery but cannot feel his legs. Darcy, a physiotherapist, tells Katherine that there is only a 10% chance that Eddie will ever walk again. The gang surprise Eddie when he returns home from hospital with a ramp, and a ceremony to renew his vows with Katherine. Eddie worries about using the painkillers he's been prescribed. After Darcy overhears Maggie video-chatting, Gary reassures Darcy about their relationship. Across the street, we see Alex's father watching them in a car, and a flashback reveals he also watched Eddie walk out of the bar the night he was hit.
38	2	"Writings on the Wall"	Tessa Blake	Terrence Coli & Geoffrey Nauffts	December 3, 2020	3.85
Gary and Darcy's relationship is flourishing, but Maggie upsets Gary by suggesting it is moving too fast. Rome meets a star actor, Shanice Williamson, about filming his script, but is concerned about the changes she might make to it. Rome and Gina argue about the decision to turn down the second baby. Gary finds Eddie has been stranded for hours alone in his house, away from his phone and wheelchair, and has wet himself. When Gary asks Darcy to be Eddie's physiotherapist, she initially feels uncomfortable because of Eddie's affair, but later agrees to do it for Katherine. Maggie grows closer to her new flatmate, Jamie, and starts a podcast. Sophie comes home early from a visit to Harvard, and decides to apply to other schools. Gary talks to Darcy about taking their relationship more slowly, Rome and Regina discuss the second baby, and Delilah decides to go to France with her dad. Alex's dad shows up at Eddie's front door.
39	3	"Letting Go"	Nina Lopez-Corrado	David Marshall Grant & Elizabeth Laime	December 10, 2020	3.57
Katherine grows suspicious when she realizes Alex's father has been to the house several times, but the detective confirms that it was not his truck that hit Eddie. Eddie and Darcy try to find a way to get along better. Alex's father finally reveals that he had covered up the real cause of Alex's death, an overdose, to protect his other daughter. Eddie, shocked by this revelation, starts taking painkillers. Rome sees a therapist about his anger as a Black man in America, and he and Gina reconcile and check in on Eve. Gary takes care of the Dixon children, and helps Danny with a bully. Maggie adopts a positive attitude, and is exhilarated after taking trapeze lessons. She invites Jamie into her bedroom.
40	4	"The Talk"	Tessa Blake	Christopher Luccy & Nikita T. Hamilton	December 17, 2020	3.33
Maggie and Jamie clear up a misunderstanding about either of them wanting more than casual sex. Katherine and Eddie discuss sex with Theo, which leads them to talk about their own lack of sex and try to reclaim their intimacy. Gina tells Shanice about Rome's depression, which makes Shanice want to make the movie more. Gary takes Sophie to her audition for MMI. When the director, Peter, rejects Sophie in a patronizing way, Gary berates him. Sophie, however, decides to try again by giving a street performance nearby, and when Peter sees it, he decides to teach her but tells her she will have to work very hard. Gary calls Maggie about Darcy's PTSD.
41	5	"Non-essential"	Nina Lopez-Corrado	Ashley Sims & Gabriela Revilla Lugo	March 11, 2021	2.90
COVID-19 derails Rome's movie. The COVID lock down in the UK means Maggie can't get an appointment for her cancer checkup, so she returns to Boston to see her doctor. Once she is in Boston, Europe closes its borders and she can't get back to Oxford. Delilah is also stuck in France due to COVID. Gary and Darcy stay at the Dixons' house to take care of the children. During Maggie's cancer check up, her doctor informs her that she is pregnant. Gary finds a therapist to help Darcy with her PTSD, but can't tell her that he got the recommendation from Maggie. The COVID-19 outbreak derails Eddie's plans to replace his painkillers with cortisone injections, leading a desperate Eddie to steal Vicodin pills from Rome's bathroom. Katherine is busy trying to get the eviction notice for the restaurant lifted.
42	6	"Miles Apart"	Tessa Blake	DJ Nash & Michelle Leibel	March 18, 2021	3.01
Gary supports Maggie when she decides to terminate the pregnancy for health reasons, and decides to stay with her while she is losing the baby even though it means missing his planned camping trip with Darcy and meeting her child, Liam, for the first time. However, Jamie turns up to support Maggie, and Gary delivers a toboggan to Liam at the cabin, explaining to Darcy that he will meet Liam when the circumstances are perfect. Rome and Regina meet Tyrell, a teenager who they initially thought had stolen their bagged food orders but had in fact delivered them. Eddie asks Dakota for more pills, and although Dakota is now sober, she brings him pills in exchange for help with her album.
43	7	"Timing"	Nina Lopez-Corrado	David Marshall Grant & Katie Scheines	March 25, 2021	3.06
After Regina discovers Rome has been slipping Tyrell and other children meals behind her back, she offers to give more meals and a customer offers to pay for more meals to be given away. This leads to a very successful campaign to give away a free meal for each meal purchased, which is promoted by Shanice. Maggie accidentally posts a podcast that includes a conversation with Jamie about her relationship with Gary. Katherine confronts Eddie when she realizes that Eddie has swapped aspirin for the Oxycodone, but Eddie lets Dakota take the blame. Gary bonds with Darcy's son, Liam. Darcy reveals that her PTSD stems from the time she shot and killed a young boy who she thought was a threat.
44	8	"The Price of Admission"	Tessa Blake	Terrence Coli & Royale Watkins & Corey Deshon	April 1, 2021	2.62
Rome and Regina suspect Eddie of having taken the Vicodin pills, and Gary and Rome confront Eddie. They find him trying to go upstairs where Theo has gone in an embarrassed huff. He tells Gary and Rome that he needs help. Katherine has been growing closer to Alan, bonding over the shared experience of being Asian in America. When she comes home, Eddie confesses that he is the one who has been taking his pills and that he can't stop. When Regina finds out Tyrell's mother has been deported, she takes him to her house to stay. Danny tells Gary about the podcast. Gary goes over to Maggie's to angrily tell her he is completely over her. Darcy asks Maggie's advice about a PTSD retreat. Maggie's tells Darcy she can talk to her whenever she wants. Gary and Darcy tell each other that they love each other.
45	9	"The Lost Sheep"	Nina Lopez-Corrado	Christopher Luccy & Nikita T. Hamilton	April 7, 2021	2.26
Gary supports Eddie in his decision to go to rehab, and Katherine and Eddie talk to Theo about where his father is going. Gary counsels a broken Katherine, but is overheard by Eddie who accuses him of betrayal. Katherine, seeking comfort, drunkenly kisses Alan, who gently refuses her advances. Tyrrell is mad he missed a call from his mother. Rome learns to let his father grieve his own way, by believing his dead wife is leaving pennies in his path. Maggie learns that she is still free from cancer but can't return to Oxford, and after she and Jamie realize they are more than just a casual hookup, they agree to end the relationship.
46	10	"Trust Me"	Tessa Blake	DJ Nash & Elizabeth Laime	April 14, 2021	2.55
Gary learns that Sophie's guitar teacher, Peter, has been grooming her, preying on her vulnerability and filming her dancing in her swimsuit. Maggie and Gina arrive to tease out the rest of the story, when we find out that Peter touched himself after hugging her. Sophie is distraught when Peter texts her to tell her a selfie she took of herself, trying to recreate a Britney Spears album cover, is inappropriate and he can't work with her anymore. Gary, furious, looks set to wreak revenge at Peter's house, but steps back when Peter's wife, Anna, comes home. Maggie accepts a job giving therapy advice on radio, and Rome sees a mystery woman visiting his mother's grave one night.
47	11	"Redefine"	Nicole Rubio	Ashley Sims & Michelle Leibel	April 21, 2021	2.01
After Alan turns up to check in on Katherine, he and Katherine end up kissing. Katherine and Theo visit Eddie in rehab, where they talk honestly about Eddie's affair with Delilah and Katherine begins to understand. Eddie is counselled by Jackie, his friend in rehab, to stay in rehab when he is tempted to leave to try and save his marriage to Katherine. Tyrrell finds out his mother has been deported to Haiti, and argues with Gina about flying to Haiti to find her. However, his mother, Martine, calls him and explains she doesn't want him to come and miss his opportunities in the US, and that she has enough worries at this early stage of her return to Haiti. Rome comes to terms with his father's new companion, Florence, and becomes closer with his father. Gary pressures Sophie to go ahead with her audition with MMI, which backfires, but they reconcile before Sophie flies to France to be with her mother.
48	12	"Junior"	Nina Lopez-Corrado	David Marshall Grant & Geoffrey Nauffts	May 5, 2021	2.10
A month passes. Danny considers coming out at school, and Gary worries his visiting father Javier might say something offensive. Javier and Darcy bond over their shared experiences as veterans. Javier tells Danny that Douglas, a friend who died saving Javier's life in Vietnam, was a closeted gay man; he advises Danny to be proud of who he is. Danny comes out to his classmates, who put up rainbow-themed Zoom backgrounds. Eddie returns home. Katherine skips dinner with him to check into a hotel with Allen, but she and Allen recognize Katherine is reacting to Eddie and spend the evening talking. Katherine confesses all to Eddie and wants to enter counseling—not to save their marriage, but to protect Theo as they end it. Walter and Florence have their romantic signals crossed until Rome and Regina advise them at a family dinner on May 25, 2020. Tyrell's guest Keke hasn't arrived, and instead sends Tyrell the video of George Floyd's murder, stunning everyone as they watch it.
49	13	"Listen"	Nicole Rubio	Royale Watkins & Corey Deshon & Nikita T. Hamilton	May 12, 2021	2.01
In response to the murder of George Floyd, the friends are forced to reevaluate their own racial biases and take to the streets of Boston. Rome opts out in favor of his mental health and has a candid conversation with his father.
50	14	"United Front"	Nina Lopez-Corrado	Terrence Coli & Elizabeth Laime	May 19, 2021	1.97
Rome tries to deal with Tyrell cutting classes to attend protests, but Tyrell's explanation has him thinking. Regina spends some time at the restaurant learning recipes from Walter's girlfriend Florence, only to have her mother butt in. Regina accuses her mother of using the wrong ingredient and ruining a dish only to realize it was herself who made the error, leading to her worrying that the recent fall she had is affecting her memory. Katherine and Eddie try to figure out how and when to tell Theo about their pending divorce, only to have Darcy's son blab the information while playing with Theo. After Maggie picks up her spirits some, Sophie goes to MMI to tell the dean of admissions why she shut down her recent audition. While there, Sophie sees a photo of a cello prodigy on the wall, and learns from the dean that the girl was accepted but committed suicide. After learning the girl is Layla Gregory, whom Sophie's instructor Peter had mentioned, Sophie is struck with the realization that Peter may have abused someone else.
51	15	"Not Alone"	Nicole Rubio	Christopher Luccy & Gabriela Revilla Lugo	May 26, 2021	2.21
Convinced that Katherine won't let him have unsupervised visits with Theo, Eddie looks into a wheelchair-accessible place and accepts Gary's offer to have a friend convert his vehicle for hand controls. However, Katherine tells Eddie it's not his disability that worries her, it's his addiction. Haunted by learning that Layla Gregory had committed suicide, Sophie visits the girl's parents. They are at first dismissive as they deal with grief, but the father later visits Sophie with evidence that her suspicions about Peter may have merit. At her mother's prodding, Regina gets a cat scan done to try and deal with her concussion and short-term memory loss, but the scan finds nothing. Elsewhere, Rome helps Tyrell make a video that explores the impact of systemic racism, but the project takes a turn they didn't expect.
52	16	"No One Is to Blame"	Nina Lopez-Corrado	DJ Nash & Michelle Leibel	June 2, 2021	2.48
Having lost her father to suicide and now dealing with Layla killing herself, Sophie visits Rome to ask what prompted him to consider ending his life. Rome's frank answer and conversation about waking up with a purpose convinces Sophie that she needs to go to the police about what Peter did to make sure he can't hurt anyone else. Regina learns that her restaurant relief funds could take months, meaning she has no income. This prompts Rome to consider directing a soda commercial that he finds offensive, until Regina convinces him otherwise. Katherine gets upset when Alan is texting someone during their picnic date, having learned that he is on a dating site, but it turns out Alan was setting up a romantic gesture. Katherine realizes she has trust issues from her time with Eddie, and asks Alan to put their relationship on pause. Alan counters that he doesn't want to wait. Eddie spends a day with Theo, with Gary supervising. Gary is later taken aback when Darcy says her ex-husband is moving across the state to Lenox and they agreed that they'd stay geographically close for the sake of Liam. Gary says how much his friend needs him right now, causing Darcy to remark that she wishes he'd treat her as well as he treats his friends.
53	17	"Justice Part 1"	Nicole Rubio	Elizabeth Laime & Terrence Coli	June 9, 2021	2.48
Delilah returns and accompanies Sophie to the police station, along with Maggie. While the detective believes Sophie's story, he feels there isn't enough evidence to charge Peter, but says he is now on police radar and will be watched closely. Eddie visits Delilah to see Charlie, and Danny overhears Delilah telling Eddie she wants to move the family to France. Gary agrees to accompany Darcy to Lenox, saying he wants to have a family with her and Liam. This leaves Eddie without a supervisor for his visits with Theo. Soon after, Theo is injured under Katherine's watch, and Eddie considers using it against her in a custody hearing. Tyrell learns that his mother's friend and colleague received a promotion that she was in line to get, and strongly believes the man turned his mom in to immigration.
54	18	"Justice Part 2"	Nina Lopez-Corrado	DJ Nash	June 9, 2021	2.48
Danny, Sophie and Gary all confront Delilah about taking her family to France, calling it selfish. Delilah counters that her time in France was the only time she felt free of people prying into Jon's suicide and her affair with Eddie. She later breaks down after smashing a photo of Jon, and Danny comforts her. Eddie decides not to use Theo's injury against Katherine, but proposes a deal: he can have unsupervised visits with Theo provided he takes a weekly drug test. Tyrell learns the true reason why his mother was caught by immigration, and feels guilty for it. Regina tearfully shuts down her restaurant, but gets some perspective when a regular carry-out customer comes in and says his wife died from COVID-19. Sophie decides to tell her story on Maggie's podcast, and mentions Peter by name. Gary stops by his father's place, asking him to provide an alibi and say Gary was there all night. Gary then heads to Peter's house, where he covers Peter's head with a cloth bag and drags him inside.

=== Season 4 (2021–22) ===
No. overall	No. in season	Title	Directed by	Written by	Original release date	U.S. viewers (millions)
55	1	"Family First"	Joanna Kerns	DJ Nash & Terrence Coli	September 22, 2021	2.09
56	2	"Not the Plan"	Joanna Kerns	Elizabeth Laime & Michelle Leibel	September 29, 2021	2.05
57	3	"Game Night"	John Fortenberry	Christopher Luccy & Nikita T. Hamilton	October 6, 2021	1.75
58	4	"Pinocchio"	Gina Lamar	DJ Nash & Claudia Vaughan	October 13, 2021	1.89
59	5	"Crystal Clear"	Joanna Kerns	David Marshall Grant & Royale Watkins	October 27, 2021	1.93
60	6	"Six Months Later"	David Warren	DJ Nash & William H. Brown	November 3, 2021	1.76
61	7	"Stay"	Tessa Blake	Katie Scheines & Natalie Mercedes Smyka	November 17, 2021	2.10
62	8	"The Things We Keep Inside"	David Warren	Christopher Luccy & Kristina Woo	December 1, 2021	1.94
63	9	"Any Way the Wind Blows"	Joanna Kerns	Terrence Coli & Elizabeth Laime	February 23, 2022	2.22
64	10	"Surprise"	David Warren	DJ Nash	March 2, 2022	1.77
65	11	"Piece of Cake"	Melanie Mayron	Michelle Leibel	March 9, 2022	1.83
66	12	"Little White Lies"	David Warren	Nikita T. Hamilton & William H. Brown	March 16, 2022	1.91
67	13	"Fresh Start"	Joanna Kerns	Elizabeth Laime & Lucile Masson	March 23, 2022	1.83
68	14	"School Ties"	John Fortenberry	Royale Watkins & Kristina Woo	April 6, 2022	1.85
69	15	"Fingers Crossed"	DJ Nash	DJ Nash & Michelle Leibel	April 13, 2022	1.96
70	16	"Lesson Learned"	Bille Woodruff	Natalie Mercedes Smyka & Katie Scheines	April 20, 2022	1.81
71	17	"60 Minutes"	Allison Miller	Christopher Luccy & William H. Brown	April 27, 2022	1.92
72	18	"Slipping"	David Giuntoli	Geoffrey Nauffts & David Marshall Grant	May 4, 2022	1.97
73	19	"Out of Hiding"	Tessa Blake	Elizabeth Laime & Terrence Coli	May 11, 2022	1.67
74	20	"Just in Case"	Joanna Kerns	DJ Nash & Michelle Leibel	May 18, 2022	1.83

=== Season 5 (2023) ===
No. overall	No. in season	Title	Directed by	Written by	Original release date	U.S. viewers (millions)
75	1	"The Last Dance"	Joanna Kerns	DJ Nash	February 8, 2023	2.21
76	2	"Think Twice"	John Fortenberry	Terrence Coli & Elizabeth Laime	February 15, 2023	2.01
77	3	"In the Room"	Joanna Kerns	Christopher Luccy & Natalie Mercedes Smyka	February 22, 2023	1.67
78	4	"A Bird in the Hand"	Richard J. Lewis	DJ Nash & Michelle Leibel	March 1, 2023	1.69
79	5	"No Place Like Home"	Romany Malco	Susan Jaffee & Katie Scheines	March 8, 2023	1.84
80	6	"Mic Drop"	David Warren	Elizabeth Laime & Jessie Stegner	March 15, 2023	1.96
81	7	"Spilled Milk"	Joanna Kerns	DJ Nash & Royale Watkins	March 22, 2023	1.87
82	8	"Dear Diary"	Rebecca Asher	Terrence Coli & Lily Citrin	March 29, 2023	1.83
83	9	"Father's Day"	DJ Nash	Michelle Leibel & M.D.J. Clarke	April 5, 2023	1.75
84	10	"The Salesman"	Christina Moses	Terrence Coli & Katie Scheines	April 12, 2023	1.91
85	11	"Ironic"	Tessa Blake	DJ Nash & Michelle Leibel	April 19, 2023	1.80
86	12	"Tough Stuff"	Joanna Kerns	Terrence Coli & Elizabeth Laime	April 26, 2023	1.84
87	13	"One Big Thing"	DJ Nash	DJ Nash & James Roday Rodriguez	May 3, 2023	2.03

== Ratings ==
=== Season 1 ===
Viewership and ratings per episode of List of A Million Little Things episodes
No.	Title	Air date	Rating/share (18–49)	Viewers (millions)	DVR (18–49)	DVR viewers (millions)	Total (18–49)	Total viewers (millions)
1	"Pilot"	September 26, 2018	1.1/5	5.07	1.1	4.27	2.2	9.34
2	"Band of Dads"	October 3, 2018	0.8/3	3.79	1.1	3.71	1.9	7.50
3	"Save the Date"	October 10, 2018	0.8/3	3.66	1.1	3.50	1.9	7.17
4	"Friday Night Dinner"	October 17, 2018	0.8/3	3.33	1.0	3.49	1.8	6.82
5	"The Game of Your Life"	October 24, 2018	0.8/3	3.49	1.0	3.41	1.8	6.91
6	"Unexpected"	October 31, 2018	0.8/3	3.31	1.0	3.36	1.8	6.67
7	"I Dare You"	November 7, 2018	0.7/3	3.28	1.1	3.53	1.8	6.81
8	"Fight or Flight"	November 28, 2018	0.8/3	3.47	1.0	3.55	1.8	7.02
9	"Perspective"	December 5, 2018	0.7/3	3.17	1.0	3.42	1.7	6.60
10	"Christmas Wishlist"	December 12, 2018	0.7/3	3.37	1.0	3.37	1.7	6.74
11	"Secrets and Lies"	January 17, 2019	1.1/5	5.22	1.1	3.53	2.2	8.76
12	"The Day Before..."	January 24, 2019	1.1/5	5.41	1.1	3.46	2.2	8.87
13	"Twelve Seconds"	January 31, 2019	1.1/5	5.29	1.0	3.31	2.1	8.61
14	"Someday"	February 7, 2019	1.0/5	5.25	1.1	3.45	2.1	8.66
15	"The Rock"	February 14, 2019	1.0/5	4.93	1.1	3.50	2.1	8.44
16	"The Rosary"	February 21, 2019	1.1/5	5.25	1.1	3.41	2.2	8.66
17	"Goodbye"	February 28, 2019	1.1/5	5.26	1.0	3.32	2.1	8.59

=== Season 2 ===
Viewership and ratings per episode of List of A Million Little Things episodes
No.	Title	Air date	Rating/share (18–49)	Viewers (millions)	DVR (18–49)	DVR viewers (millions)	Total (18–49)	Total viewers (millions)
1	"Coming Home"	September 26, 2019	1.0/5	4.99	0.8	3.06	1.8	8.06
2	"Grand Canyon"	October 3, 2019	0.8/4	4.77	1.0	2.97	1.8	7.74
3	"Mixed Signals"	October 10, 2019	0.8/4	4.23	0.9	3.01	1.7	7.25
4	"The Perfect Storm"	October 17, 2019	0.7/4	4.05	0.9	3.12	1.6	7.17
5	"Austin"	October 24, 2019	0.9/4	4.38	0.7	2.91	1.6	7.29
6	"Unleashed"	October 31, 2019	0.7/3	4.16	0.8	2.70	1.5	6.83
7	"Ten Years"	November 7, 2019	0.8/4	4.45	0.7	2.91	1.5	7.36
8	"Goodnight"	November 14, 2019	0.8/4	4.57	0.8	2.87	1.6	7.44
9	"Time Stands Still"	November 21, 2019	0.8/4	4.59	0.8	2.91	1.6	7.50
10	"The Kiss"	January 23, 2020	0.7/4	4.17	0.9	3.45	1.6	7.62
11	"We're the Howards"	January 30, 2020	0.6/3	3.81	0.9	3.24	1.5	7.06
12	"Guilty"	February 6, 2020	0.7/4	3.73	0.9	3.36	1.6	7.07
13	"Daisy"	February 13, 2020	0.6/3	3.65	0.9	3.43	1.5	7.07
14	"The Sleepover"	February 20, 2020	0.6/3	3.65	0.8	3.33	1.4	6.99
15	"The Lunch"	February 27, 2020	0.6/4	3.68	0.8	3.19	1.4	6.87
16	"Change of Plans"	March 5, 2020	0.6/3	3.64	0.9	3.25	1.5	6.90
17	"One Year Later"	March 12, 2020	0.6/3	3.75	0.9	3.45	1.5	7.20
18	"Mothers and Daughters"	March 19, 2020	0.7/3	4.13	0.8	3.12	1.5	7.25
19	"'Til Death Do Us Part"	March 26, 2020	0.7/3	4.27	0.8	3.00	1.5	7.27

=== Season 3 ===
Viewership and ratings per episode of List of A Million Little Things episodes
No.	Title	Air date	Rating (18–49)	Viewers (millions)	DVR (18–49)	DVR viewers (millions)	Total (18–49)	Total viewers (millions)
1	"Hit & Run"	November 19, 2020	0.7	4.04	—N/a	—N/a	—N/a	—N/a
2	"Writings on the Wall"	December 3, 2020	0.6	3.85	0.7	2.81	1.2	6.67
3	"Letting Go"	December 10, 2020	0.5	3.57	0.6	2.76	1.2	6.32
4	"The Talk"	December 17, 2020	0.5	3.33	—N/a	—N/a	—N/a	—N/a
5	"Non-essential"	March 11, 2021	0.4	2.90	0.5	2.60	1.0	5.50
6	"Miles Apart"	March 18, 2021	0.5	3.01	—N/a	—N/a	—N/a	—N/a
7	"Timing"	March 25, 2021	0.5	3.06	—N/a	—N/a	—N/a	—N/a
8	"The Price of Admission"	April 1, 2021	0.4	2.62	—N/a	—N/a	—N/a	—N/a
9	"The Lost Sheep"	April 7, 2021	0.4	2.26	0.5	2.35	0.9	4.62
10	"Trust Me"	April 14, 2021	0.4	2.55	0.5	2.33	0.8	4.88
11	"Redefine"	April 21, 2021	0.3	2.01	0.5	2.38	0.8	4.39
12	"Junior"	May 5, 2021	0.4	2.10	0.5	2.48	0.9	4.58
13	"Listen"	May 12, 2021	0.3	2.01	0.5	2.20	0.8	4.21
14	"United Front"	May 19, 2021	0.3	1.97	0.4	2.10	0.7	4.07
15	"Not Alone"	May 26, 2021	0.3	2.21	0.5	2.28	0.8	4.49
16	"No One Is to Blame"	June 2, 2021	0.3	2.48	0.5	2.15	0.8	4.62
17–18	"Justice Part 1" / "Justice Part 2"	June 9, 2021	0.4	2.48	0.4	2.01	0.8	4.50

=== Season 4 ===
Viewership and ratings per episode of List of A Million Little Things episodes
No.	Title	Air date	Rating (18–49)	Viewers (millions)	DVR (18–49)	DVR viewers (millions)	Total (18–49)	Total viewers (millions)
1	"Family First"	September 22, 2021	0.3	2.09	—N/a	—N/a	—N/a	—N/a
2	"Not the Plan"	September 29, 2021	0.3	2.05	—N/a	—N/a	—N/a	—N/a
3	"Game Night"	October 6, 2021	0.2	1.75	—N/a	—N/a	—N/a	—N/a
4	"Pinocchio"	October 13, 2021	0.3	1.89	0.4	2.21	0.7	4.10
5	"Crystal Clear"	October 27, 2021	0.3	1.93	—N/a	—N/a	—N/a	—N/a
6	"Six Months Later"	November 3, 2021	0.3	1.76	—N/a	—N/a	—N/a	—N/a
7	"Stay"	November 17, 2021	0.3	2.10	0.4	2.35	0.7	4.45
8	"The Things We Keep Inside"	December 1, 2021	0.3	1.94	0.4	2.02	0.7	3.96
9	"Any Way the Wind Blows"	February 23, 2022	0.3	2.22	—N/a	—N/a	—N/a	—N/a
10	"Surprise"	March 2, 2022	0.2	1.77	—N/a	—N/a	—N/a	—N/a
11	"Piece of Cake"	March 9, 2022	0.2	1.83	—N/a	—N/a	—N/a	—N/a
12	"Little White Lies"	March 16, 2022	0.2	1.91	—N/a	—N/a	—N/a	—N/a
13	"Fresh Start"	March 23, 2022	0.3	1.83	—N/a	—N/a	—N/a	—N/a
14	"School Ties"	April 6, 2022	0.3	1.85	—N/a	—N/a	—N/a	—N/a
15	"Fingers Crossed"	April 13, 2022	0.3	1.96	—N/a	—N/a	—N/a	—N/a
16	"Lesson Learned"	April 20, 2022	0.3	1.81	—N/a	—N/a	—N/a	—N/a
17	"60 Minutes"	April 27, 2022	0.3	1.92	—N/a	—N/a	—N/a	—N/a
18	"Slipping"	May 4, 2022	0.3	1.97	—N/a	—N/a	—N/a	—N/a
19	"Out of Hiding"	May 11, 2022	0.2	1.67	—N/a	—N/a	—N/a	—N/a
20	"Just in Case"	May 18, 2022	0.2	1.83	—N/a	—N/a	—N/a	—N/a

=== Season 5 ===
Viewership and ratings per episode of List of A Million Little Things episodes
No.	Title	Air date	Rating (18–49)	Viewers (millions)
1	"The Last Dance"	February 8, 2023	0.3	2.21
2	"Think Twice"	February 15, 2023	0.2	2.01
3	"In the Room"	February 22, 2023	0.2	1.67
4	"A Bird in the Hand"	March 1, 2023	0.2	1.69
5	"No Place Like Home"	March 8, 2023	0.2	1.84
6	"Mic Drop"	March 15, 2023	0.2	1.96
7	"Spilled Milk"	March 22, 2023	0.2	1.87
8	"Dear Diary"	March 29, 2023	0.2	1.83
9	"Father's Day"	April 5, 2023	0.2	1.75
10	"The Salesman"	April 12, 2023	0.2	1.91
11	"Ironic"	April 19, 2023	0.2	1.80
12	"Tough Stuff"	April 26, 2023	0.2	1.84
13	"One Big Thing"	May 3, 2023	0.2	2.03

A Million Little Things : U.S. viewers per episode (millions)

Season	Episode number																			
Season	1	2	3	4	5	6	7	8	9	10	11	12	13	14	15	16	17	18	19	20
1	5.07	3.79	3.66	3.33	3.49	3.31	3.28	3.47	3.17	3.37	5.22	5.41	5.29	5.25	4.93	5.25	5.26	–		
2	4.99	4.77	4.23	4.05	4.38	4.16	4.45	4.57	4.59	4.17	3.81	3.73	3.65	3.65	3.68	3.64	3.75	4.13	4.27	–
3	4.04	3.85	3.57	3.33	2.90	3.01	3.06	2.62	2.26	2.55	2.01	2.10	2.01	1.97	2.21	2.48	2.48	2.48	–	
4	2.09	2.05	1.75	1.89	1.93	1.76	2.10	1.94	2.22	1.77	1.83	1.91	1.83	1.85	1.96	1.81	1.92	1.97	1.67	1.83
5	2.21	2.01	1.67	1.69	1.84	1.96	1.87	1.83	1.75	1.91	1.80	1.84	2.03	–						

Audience measurement performed by Nielsen Media Research
