= There's Always Woodstock =

- Directed by: Rita Merson
- Written by: Rita Merson
- Produced by: Peter Schafer
- Starring: Allison Miller; Jason Ritter; Brittany Snow; Ryan Guzman; Katey Sagal; Rumer Willis; James Wolk; Richard Reid
- Cinematography: Matthew Irving
- Edited by: Cara Silverman
- Music by: Christopher Westlake
- Distributed by: Sunrise Films
- Release date: March 19, 2014 (Gasparilla International Film Festival)
- Running time: 90 minutes
- Country: United States
- Language: English

There's Always Woodstock is an American comedy-drama film directed and written by Rita Merson and starring Allison Miller, Jason Ritter, Brittany Snow, Ryan Guzman, Katey Sagal, Rumer Willis and James Wolk. It was released on March 19, 2014.

== Premise ==
Catherine Brown (Allison Miller) is a workaholic songwriter who lives locked in her apartment in New York City. When her life falls apart she is forced to confront her past when she spends the summer at her childhood home in Woodstock.

== Cast ==
- Allison Miller as Catherine Brown
- James Wolk as Noah Bernstein
- Rumer Willis as Emily
- Jason Ritter as Garret
- Brittany Snow as Jody
- Katey Sagal as Lee Ann
- Anna Anissimova as Ryan
- Ryan Guzman as Dylan
- Richard Reid as Ron Kleynerman
- Alexie Gilmore as Sally
- Richard Riehle as Mr. Harmon
- Finesse Mitchell as Alex
- Sean McNabb as Biker
- Kate Lacey as Sally
- Vanessa Dubasso as French Girl
- Jim Klock as Dinner Guest
