= Pup Academy =

Disney Channel TV series

- Created by: Anna McRoberts
- Starring: Don Lake; Christian Convery; Aria Birch; Gabrielle Miller
- Voices of: Riley O'Donnell; Chance Hurstfield; Dylan Schombing; Brian George
- Theme music composer: Matthew Tishler
- Opening theme: "No Matter What" by Dakota Lotus
- Composer: Brahm Wenger
- Countries of origin: Canada; United States
- Original language: English
- No. of seasons: 1
- No. of episodes: 19

Production
- Executive producers: Anna McRoberts; Robert Vince
- Producers: Joanne Gerein; Michael Strange
- Cinematography: Mark Irwin
- Running time: 46 minutes
- Production company: Air Bud Entertainment

Original release
- Network: Disney Channel; TVOntario
- Release: August 26 – December 15, 2019

Pup Academy is a television series that premiered on Disney Channel in the United States and on TVOntario in Canada on August 26, 2019. The series stars Don Lake, Christian Convery, Aria Birch, Gabrielle Miller, Riley O'Donnell, Chance Hurstfield, Dylan Schombing, and Brian George.

== Premise ==
Charlie is a man who has established a secret academy for puppies in a parallel world where they are educated on how to become dogs. His grandson, Morgan, moves into his neighborhood and he enlists Morgan to help educate the puppies Spark, Corazon, and Whiz at the time when the bond between human and canine that is powered by the Canis Primus constellation starts to fade. This ties into a prophecy involving a boy and a stray puppy in which the Dean of Graduates (or D.O.G. for short) has to find that special stray, save Pup Academy, and restore the bond between humans and canines.

== Cast and characters ==
- Don Lake as Charlie, the janitor of Pup Academy. His ancestors helped found the school
- Christian Convery as Morgan, the grandson of Charlie who helps out at Pup Academy
- Aria Birch as Izzy, a girl who Morgan befriends
- Gabrielle Miller as Molly, Morgan's mother
- Riley O'Donnell as the voice of Spark, a street-smart stray Boxer
- Chance Hurstfield as the voice of Corazon, a goofy Golden Retriever who is owned by Izzy
- Dylan Schombing as the voice of Whiz, a nervous and clever sheepdog who is owned by James
- Brian George as the voice of D.O.G., a Pup Academy Siberian Husky dean who looks for the stray of the prophecy

== Production ==
On October 15, 2018, it was announced that Disney and Netflix ordered Pup Academy, with a feature-length pilot, as well as 22 regular episodes. Serving as Air Bud Entertainment's debut television series on Disney Channel, the series is executive produced by Anna McRoberts and Robert Vince and directed by Robert Vince. On July 31, 2019, it was announced that the series would premiere on August 26, 2019; following the premiere, new episodes of the series resumed on September 4, 2019. The series also began airing on TVOntario's TVOKids block in Canada on August 26, 2019. Internationally, the show launched on Netflix in February 2020.

== Episodes ==
No.	Title	Directed by	Written by	Original release date	U.S. viewers (millions)
1	"The Stray's First Day"	Robert Vince and Anna McRoberts	Anna McRoberts	August 26, 2019	0.38
Guest stars: Michael Teigen as Clark, Lauren McGibbon as Lou, Nolan Hupp as James
2	"Tell Us About Your Human Day"	Robert Vince	Tom Berger	September 4, 2019	0.23
3	"Cooking Up Trouble"	Anna McRoberts	Heidi Foss	September 5, 2019	0.24
4	"My Uncle Is Dude"	Anna McRoberts	Story by : Heidi Foss; Teleplay by : Heidi Foss and Anna McRoberts	September 6, 2019	0.20
5	"Oopsie!"	Robert Vince	Craig Martin	September 9, 2019	0.24
6	"Spark Strays"	Robert Vince	Craig Martin	September 10, 2019	0.18
7	"Izzy Gets Busy"	Robert Vince	Karen Fowler	September 11, 2019	0.28
8	"Kitten Academy"	Anna McRoberts	Eric Toth	September 12, 2019	0.29
9	"Into the Wildwood"	Robert Vince	Tom Berger	September 16, 2019	0.19
10	"Secrets Unleashed"	Stefan Scaini	Story by : Jay Shore; Teleplay by : Tom Berger	September 17, 2019	0.25
11	"The Substitute"	Stefan Scaini	Heidi Foss	September 18, 2019	0.26
12	"The Thing with King"	Robert Vince	Anna McRoberts	September 19, 2019	0.25
13	"The Constellation Fades"	Stefan Scaini	Eric Toth	November 24, 2019	0.35
14	"Spark Wants Back"	Stefan Scaini	Jay Shore	November 24, 2019	0.33
15	"The Day of the Stray"	Stefan Scaini	Heidi Foss and Eric Toth	December 1, 2019	0.39
16	"Skunked!"	Stefan Scaini	Nathaniel Moher	December 1, 2019	0.34
17	"The King Sting"	Robert Vince	Robert Vince and Piers Rae	December 8, 2019	0.50
18	"Most Valuable Pup"	Robert Vince	Story by : Piers Rae & David Elmaleh; Teleplay by : Piers Rae	December 8, 2019	0.43
19	"The Stray's Last Day"	Robert Vince	Teleplay by : Heidi Foss & Anna McRoberts and Piers Rae & Robert Vince	December 15, 2019	0.47

== Ratings ==
Viewership and ratings per season of Pup Academy
Season	Episodes	First aired		Last aired		Avg. viewers (millions)
Season	Episodes	Date	Viewers (millions)	Date	Viewers (millions)	Avg. viewers (millions)
1	19	August 26, 2019	0.38	December 15, 2019	0.47	0.30
