= Kings (American TV series) =

American television series

- Genre: Drama; Speculative fiction
- Created by: Michael Green
- Starring: Ian McShane; Christopher Egan; Susanna Thompson; Allison Miller; Eamonn Walker; Sebastian Stan; Dylan Baker; Wes Studi
- Composer: Trevor Morris
- Country of origin: United States
- Original language: English
- No. of seasons: 1
- No. of episodes: 13

Production
- Executive producers: Michael Green; Francis Lawrence; Erwin Stoff
- Producers: Barry M. Berg; Margot Lulick
- Camera setup: Single-camera
- Running time: 45–48 minutes
- Production companies: J.A. Green Construction Corp. 3 Arts Entertainment; Universal Media Studios

Original release
- Network: NBC
- Release: March 15 – July 25, 2009

Kings is an American drama television series created by Michael Green which aired on NBC from March 15 to July 25, 2009. The series' narrative is loosely based on the biblical story of King David, but set in a kingdom that culturally and technologically resembles the present-day United States.

Advance showings received mostly positive critical reviews. The Sunday, March 15, 2009, premiere placed fourth in network television ratings for that evening. After four episodes aired, NBC moved it to a Saturday slot, but only showed one more episode before pulling the series until summer. The remaining seven episodes aired on Saturdays in June and July. However, the network cancelled Kings after failing to find a sufficient audience.

== Plot ==
Kings is set in the fictional Kingdom of Gilboa, a modern absolute monarchy. Gilboa is ruled by King Silas Benjamin, who originally formed the United Kingdom two decades before from the three warring countries of Gilboa, Carmel, and Selah. He believes that he has been divinely anointed king, and he often cites the day when a swarm of monarch butterflies once landed on his head in the form of "a living crown" which called upon him to form the Monarchy and Kingdom.

All is not well for Silas. His policies and actions are being manipulated by his queen's brother, William Cross, who holds substantial control over the royal treasury and also appears to be the major stakeholder as CEO/Chairman of Crossgen (which appears to have a large stake in the economy of Gilboa). The heir apparent, Prince Jack, secretly gay, is constantly reminded that the rules of succession have yet to be set. Silas himself has a secret mistress with whom he has a young son.

Events of the series are set into motion when young David Shepherd, a Gilboan soldier in a war against the Republic of Gath, single-handedly rescues a captive soldier from behind enemy lines and destroys a "Goliath-Class" tank with a shoulder fired missile launcher. The captive soldier is Prince Jack, and David not only becomes an instant star in the national media, but he also earns the gratitude of King Silas, much to the chagrin of the prince.

King Silas brings David into the capital city of Shiloh where he is promoted to captain and then maneuvered into the plum position of military liaison to the media. He soon finds himself in the midst of royal court politics with little initial awareness of the forces acting behind them. He also develops feelings for Silas's daughter, Princess Michelle, which she privately reciprocates.

Queen Rose runs the royal household with an iron fist and does her best to keep the warring factions of the family from destroying the monarchy. She is the one person to whom the King will listen, while he will not hesitate to turn his back on or even order the death penalty for his own children. Queen Rose, in many ways, rules the Kingdom from behind the scenes.

In the pilot episode, David, much like Silas years before, is set upon by a living "crown" of monarch butterflies, as Silas witnesses the event from a discreet distance. Silas has already been told that God no longer supports his reign, and this then implies that David is the divine choice as his successor. This troubles the King so much that he initially plots to have David killed. David, however, soon comes to interpret the appearance of the monarch butterflies as an omen that he is meant to serve King Silas, and the sovereign accepts this, progressively drawing David deeper into his court. Through the series, David and Michelle's romance blossoms, first secretly and then publicly when Michelle informs King Silas. Silas falsely accuses David of being a traitor because David lied to Silas about his relationship with Michelle. During David's imprisonment, Michelle learns that she is pregnant with David's child.

The intervening episodes continue to use symbolism and images to add depth to the basic story line, such as casting shadows in the shape of a cross on David and other characters, historical and biblical stories being intertwined in the plot (David defeating the seemingly invincible Goliath tank), return of a prodigal son (or nephew, in this case), and King Silas making promises and pleas directly to God that are answered, but not always as he had hoped. There also are references to more modern themes, such as the Cold War, encroachment of technology in our lives, companies that perpetuate wars to make money, and national policy being influenced by holding the nation's treasury hostage.

In the two-part finale, William Cross orchestrates a coup with the intention of placing Jack on the throne as his puppet. Silas is shot twice, but survives. Although Silas has framed David for treason, David helps return him to power. Reverend Samuels, Silas' long-time spiritual advisor and confidant, is killed under William's orders but appears in posthumous visions to David, the Princess, and Silas (none of whom is aware that Samuels is dead), confirming to them that God has chosen David to be the next king. David flees to Gath on Samuels' advice, and Michelle is sent into exile to bear his child in secret. Silas declares that he is now God's enemy as dark storm clouds loom above his troubled kingdom.

== Cast and characters ==
=== Main ===
- Ian McShane as Silas Benjamin, King of Gilboa – a counterpart to the biblical King Saul. Silas has united the kingdom of Gilboa and built its capital city, Shiloh, but now fears that God has forsaken him.
- Christopher Egan as Captain David Shepherd – a counterpart to the biblical David. David is an idealistic young soldier who finds himself in the unfamiliar world of court intrigue.
- Susanna Thompson as Rose Cross Benjamin – queen of Gilboa, a counterpart to the biblical Ahinoam, is married to King Silas. The queen claims to abhor politics, but ruthlessly manipulates court life from behind the scenes.
- Allison Miller as Michelle Benjamin – princess of Gilboa, a counterpart to the biblical Michal. Silas's daughter, a few minutes older than Jack, and crusader for improving the kingdom's health care system, Michelle finds herself drawn to David.
- Eamonn Walker as the Reverend Ephram Samuels – a counterpart to the biblical prophet Samuel. Reverend Samuels was instrumental in Silas's rise to power, but his relationship with the king has since become strained.
- Sebastian Stan as Jonathan "Jack" Benjamin – crown prince of Gilboa, a counterpart to the biblical Jonathan. Jack is Silas's ambitious and frustrated son, who initially sees David as a rival at court. Jack plays the role of a dissolute, womanizing rake in front of the kingdom's press, but is secretly gay. The King knows it, too, and challenges him to restrain his desires if he wishes to become king.
- Dylan Baker as William Cross – industrialist and brother to Queen Rose. William finances Silas's Royal Treasury, but withdraws his funds when, contrary to his wishes, Silas seeks an end to the war with neighboring Gath.
- Wes Studi as General Linus Abner – a counterpart to the biblical Abner, is the head of Gilboa's military. Though initially loyal to the king, Abner eventually betrays Silas as he believes the king has become too 'soft'; in the episode "Brotherhood" Abner is killed by Silas for his betrayal.

=== Recurring ===
- Sarita Choudhury as Helen Pardis – a counterpart to the biblical Rizpah, King Silas's mistress and mother of his illegitimate son. Silas attempts to offer up his relationship with Helen as a sacrifice to God in order to save his son's life, but eventually returns to her.
- Macaulay Culkin as Andrew Cross – the son of William Cross and nephew to the king, who was exiled from Gilboa for unspecified reasons, but has returned as part of a deal between Silas and William.
- Becky Ann Baker as Jessie Shepherd – David's mother
- Tom Guiry as Ethan Shepherd – David's brother
- Michael Crane as Chancellor Marcus Hanson
- Armando Riesco as Sean Savoy
- Brian Cox as Vesper Abaddon – the former King of Carmel
- Marlyne Afflack as Thomasina – the efficient palace secretary and aide-de-camp
- Steve Rosen as Perry Straussler – court historian and biographer of King Silas. Analogous to the author of the proto-biblical document known as S, or the Court History of David, referred to in the show as the "Book of David".
- Michael Arden as Joseph Lasile – Jack's clandestine boyfriend
- Leslie Bibb as Katrina Ghent – socialite and new Minister of Information
- Joel Marsh Garland as Klotz – member of the Royal Guard
- Jason Antoon as Boyden – member of the Royal Guard
- Kadin George as Seth – King Silas' illegitimate son. Based on the biblical Ish-bosheth.
- Michael Stahl-David as Paul Lash – Michelle's partner in her health care plan
- Kathleen Mealia as Lucinda Wolfsen – one of Jack's girlfriends from a famous upper-class family.

== Episodes ==
No.	Title	Directed by	Written by	Original release date
1	"Goliath (Part 1)"	Francis Lawrence	Michael Green	March 15, 2009
King Silas Benjamin (Ian McShane) confronts escalating tensions with a neighboring country in the premiere episode of this drama set in a modern-day monarchy. Meanwhile, a young soldier named David Shepherd (Christopher Egan) inspires the nation after a bold rescue mission in which he unknowingly retrieved the king's son (Sebastian Stan) from an enemy camp. Silas rewards David by appointing him as the royal family's press secretary. This inspires jealousy in the prince, who sees David as a rival for both power and his father's affections.
2	"Goliath (Part 2)"	Francis Lawrence	Michael Green	March 15, 2009
David goes to the frontlines of the renewed conflict to see his wounded brother. In doing so he reveals the truth of the Goliath encounter to him before he dies. Filled with anguish he crosses no man's land to plead for peace which is ultimately successful. Gath agrees to discuss a possible treaty with Gilboa.
3	"Prosperity"	Francis Lawrence	Michael Green	March 22, 2009
Feeling threatened by David's popularity, Silas and Abner plot against him, but this backfires when his absence from the treaty signing with Gath prompts concerns from Gath's leader, who refuses to proceed without David. Behind the scenes, William Cross (Dylan Baker), the King's brother-in-law, secretly tells Silas that the war has been highly profitable for Cross's company, CrossGen, and asks that peace be delayed. Dialogue reveals that nearly all of the royal treasury is made up of gold on loan from Cross, so when Silas refuses to honor Cross's request, Cross uses his power over the treasury to undermine Silas. Meanwhile, Jack goes on a shopping spree to spite his parents.
4	"First Night"	Francis Lawrence	Michael Green	March 29, 2009
Silas ducks out of an event to be with his ailing illegitimate son. Elsewhere, Jack takes David out for a night on the town in hopes of tarnishing his image, and Reverend Samuels continues to clash with Silas.
5	"Insurrection"	Adam Davidson	Erik Oleson	April 5, 2009
David's loyalties are tested after Silas leverages Port Prosperity during negotiations with Gath; Silas's plan to give the region to Gath as a gesture of good will would cede a farming community of loyal Gilboa citizens, including David's family home, to the enemy. Silas orders David to go to the protests and defend the king's decision, which puts David at odds with his family and old neighbors. David and Michelle attempt to find a peaceful solution after several citizens, led by David's brother, decide to protest with armed rebellion. Elsewhere, William is inspired by the unpopularity of Silas's decision, and tries to persuade Jack to help him overthrow his father.
6	"Judgment Day"	Clark Johnson	Julie Martin	April 18, 2009
Silas presides over 10 cases during an annual tradition called Judgment Day. The event drives a wedge between David and Michelle, who compete against each other for the 10th case spot; David needs it to get his brother a royal pardon, while Michelle is desperate to finally gain an audience for her health-care reforms. Elsewhere, the king's nephew (Macaulay Culkin) returns from exile, and Jack and Katrina grow closer during their quest for power.
7	"Brotherhood"	Tucker Gates	Kamran Pasha	June 13, 2009
Jack and David go to Gath to shore up the peace treaty, but end up behind enemy lines after they are attacked by Gath soldiers who don't want peace. Elsewhere, Michelle encounters problems stemming from her health-care bill, as she learns that universal care has over-crowded the hospitals. In penance, Michelle purposely exposes herself to the Plague, so that she can comfort a dying boy. Silas takes steps to prevent the plague from ravaging the city, and end the plague that exists in his own house.
8	"The Sabbath Queen"	Akiva Goldsman	Michael Green	June 20, 2009
Despite his wife's request to invite their nephew, Andrew Cross, to his birthday party, Silas refuses to do so. In revenge for the slight, Andrew's father attempts to ruin the party by ordering his company, CrossGen, to shut off the power for all of Shiloh. Jack and Michelle each take advantage of the anonymity of the dark to enjoy forbidden romance; Jack spends the evening with his boyfriend, while Michelle spends it with David. However, unaware that Michelle has left willingly, Silas and Rose order a search party for the princess. Meanwhile, as he waits in the dark, Silas has flashbacks to when Michelle was younger and ill. The flashbacks reveal that Silas, to prevent Michelle from dying, made a deal with the Angel of Death (Saffron Burrows) and agreed that if Death allowed Michelle to live, Silas would eventually abdicate his throne to a more worthy successor.
9	"Pilgrimage"	Ed Bianchi	David Schulner	June 27, 2009
King Silas goes on a pilgrimage and takes a surprised David with him. While out in the country, David is introduced to the king's hidden life and secret second family outside the palace walls. Silas asks David to reveal a secret in return, but David, having promised Michelle that he wouldn't reveal their romance, lies to the king and swears that he has no secrets. When Michelle reveals the romance to her father, Silas decides that David has betrayed him. Meanwhile, Michelle and Jack's respective secret love lives are under the threat of being exposed, forcing Queen Rose to take protective action.
10	"Chapter One"	Adam Kane	Bradford Winters	July 4, 2009
In revenge for David's secret romance with Michelle, King Silas sends David on a quest to recover a national treasure, the stolen Charter of Gilboa. Hoping that David will never return from the mission, Silas sends David to look for the charter in the dangerous southern territories, a high-crime region where many citizens would not respect David's royal authority. While on the mission, David discovers shocking information about his father's death. Meanwhile, Jack's engagement to Katrina brings grief from Queen Rose and generosity from Silas.
11	"Javelin"	Clark Johnson	Seamus Kevin Fahey	July 11, 2009
More fearful than ever of David's popularity as a national hero, Silas arranges for David to be framed and arrested for treason, and appoints Jack as prosecutor; together, Jack and Silas conspire to stack up false evidence that David is a spy from Gath, who has carefully orchestrated all of his acts of heroism in an attempt to gain power. Michelle realizes that she could serve as David's alibi and thus save him from death despite the evidence stacked against him, and promises to testify on David's behalf. However, Rose convinces Michelle that it would be too dangerous to defend David, and she betrays him. Cross, who initially hoped for David's execution, switches sides and teams up with Reverend Ephram Samuels in an attempt to help David escape. However, David refuses their help after realizing that they are planning a coup. Unaware that Jack is one of the conspirators, David attempts to warn him of the threat to Silas's crown.
12	"The New King (Part 1)"	Ed Bianchi	Kara Corthron	July 18, 2009
After imprisoning Jack and David for treason, Silas continues with his plan to hand over Port Prosperity to long-time enemy Gath. Meanwhile, Michelle seeks a way to keep David alive, and Cross and Jack continue their plans to overthrow the King.
13	"The New King (Part 2)"	Tucker Gates	Story by : Julie Martin & Erik Oleson; Teleplay by : Michael Green & David Schulner	July 25, 2009
Jack and William seize power when Jack declares himself king. Despite Jack's initial plans to be a good king, he immediately becomes a ruthless, violent tyrant, while also serving as a puppet for Cross, who pushes for renewed war with the Republic of Gath. Remembering Silas's "pilgrimage," David finds Silas hiding out with his secret family. Despite their reasons for hating each other, David and Silas must work together in order to put an end to Cross and Jack's tyranny. Backed by an army of tanks on loan from Gath and commanded by David, Silas bloodlessly and easily resumes command of Gilboa. Restored to the throne, Silas is told by God that he must step down in favor of David, but Silas instead attacks David in a physical confrontation. As both David and Silas see more and more signs that David, despite his reluctance, is destined to be the new king, David realizes that his life is in danger, and he flees to Gath.

== Production ==
=== Development ===
On November 5, 2007, NBC ordered the two-hour pilot of Kings, the last pilot NBC ordered before the 2007 Writer's Strike. Michael Green (Heroes, Everwood) penned the script and Francis Lawrence (I Am Legend) was set to direct. When Green pitched the series to NBC, he told them:

I want to take one of the classic stories that no one has ever retold and find a way to re-conceive it while still being faithful to the original material but at the same time exploring the themes, modernizing it in every way.

NBC officially ordered the show to series on May 19, 2008. Green planned out the entire first season, which was to consist of 13 episodes.

Kings was also the beneficiary of an unusual advertising arrangement; insurance company Liberty Mutual sponsored Kings with US$5 million. Liberty Mutual had previously approached ABC and CBS about such an arrangement. A report in Forbes magazine said that Liberty Mutual was involved in the show's creative development — including "the right to go over the show's scripts", and even "clean[ing] up dialogue". However, show creator Michael Green denied that Liberty Mutual controlled or censored the show in any way.

The series was filmed partially in New York City at the Brooklyn Museum, on Eastern Parkway and Washington Avenue, Union Theological Seminary on Broadway and 121st St, as well as in and around The Capitale Building in Downtown New York City on Grand Street and Elizabeth Street, and soundstages in Greenpoint, Brooklyn. Filming for the pilot was also done at Hempstead House, part of the former Guggenheim estate at Sands Point Preserve on Long Island. The script for the first episode, "Goliath", was leaked some time prior to broadcast.

NBC did not advertise Kings during its broadcast of the 2009 Super Bowl, although it did advertise several other programs. In interviews with NBC executives, Television Week described a three-phase marketing push on behalf of Kings, and stated that NBC was "going out of its way since November to market Kings to so-called cultural tastemakers, hoping they'll help spread the word to the masses".

Green said that although NBC was editorially supportive of Kings and its religious themes, the network's marketing division shied away from mentioning the drama's biblical roots and themes of faith in advertising:

I talked extensively with them about this. It was a very bizarre divide. I found that in the development of the show, on the creative level of what the episodes and their content would be, I got nothing but support and interest in the religious or magical or somehow belief-inspired storytelling. When the time came for the marketing, there was a very deliberate, outspoken, loud desire articulated by them that, 'We are not going to say King David.' They were scared to say King David. They just felt that that would be detrimental to the show. I thought it was the clearest way to express what the show was about, and I thought it might actually generate interest. But there was a fear of either backlash or marginalizing or pigeonholing. There were a lot of reasons they had. They wouldn't go near it in the marketing, but they never had a problem with it on the creative level, which is why I was so baffled.

Green also expressed disappointment that Kings was not marketed to religious audiences:

…[my] experience was that they didn't know about it. The marketing stayed away from it. To their detriment, they spent their money on a campaign that tried to sell the sci-fi aspects of a monarchy. And that utterly failed to generate any interest in the show. So nobody knew what it was.

Green attributed the decision to avoid mentioning the show's biblical roots in promotion to "fear of reprisal from the religious audience".

=== Casting ===
The role for King Silas was originally written for Ian McShane, but Green thought that it would be unlikely to get him to play the lead. McShane was sent the script and enjoyed it, and was very open to returning to television after the HBO series Deadwood. "Probably two or three hundred" actors auditioned for the role of David Shepherd, before producers came across Chris Egan, "who was a real find," according to Lawrence. Allison Miller was also cast late in the process, joining Sebastian Stan and Susanna Thompson. Brian Cox joined the series in a recurring role, playing a rival to King Silas. Macaulay Culkin also appeared in a multi-episode arc, playing King Silas's nephew, who was exiled for mysterious reasons. Miguel Ferrer (Crossing Jordan), Michael Stahl-David (The Black Donnellys), and Leslie Bibb (Crossing Jordan) were also cast for multi-episode arcs. Saffron Burrows appeared in one episode as the Angel of Death.

== DVD ==
A three-disc DVD set, entitled Kings – The Complete Series, was released on September 29, 2009. The DVD contains deleted scenes from the show's finale; the scenes were cut because they "created intrigue" for a second season, which by that point the producers knew would not be made.

== Reception ==
=== Critical response ===
The show garnered a 58 out of 100 on Metacritic, symbolizing "mixed to average" reviews. In contrast, the show gained greater affinity among user based reviews, giving it an 8.7 user score on Metacritic, symbolizing "universal acclaim" reviews. An early review of Green's pilot script called the show "bold, bizarre, fun." NBC pre-released the first four episodes of the series to critics and garnered mostly positive reviews. Edward Douglas of ComingSoon.Net stated that "the writing is sharp and the acting is excellent, as Green has assembled a cast that's almost unprecedented for a television show. Ian McShane is as riveting in the role of King Silas as he was as Al Swearengen, giving the sort of loquacious speeches that he's great at giving." Brian Ford Sullivan of The Futon Critic commented that "Kings is ultimately a show you're either going to dismiss as silly and pretentious or fall in love with because of its silliness and pretentiousness. I find myself in the latter category because I'm always a sucker for swing-for-fences serialized shows like this, especially when it looks ... and feels unlike anything on television right now." In a glowing review of the series' pilot, Heather Havrilesky of Salon.com praised the series' themes, scope, art direction, cinematography and Ian McShane's performance, concluding: "The dialogue is just so artful and poetic, the characters are so appealing, the whole damn package is so original and daring and lovely, that after watching the first four hours, it's impossible not to feel inspired and cheered by the fact that a drama this ambitious and unique could make it onto network TV." Young adult book author Brent Hartinger said, "The new NBC series Kings ... is top-notch television — smart, original, and thoroughly engrossing — and it will end up reshaping the television landscape in much the way fantasy-esque shows such as Lost and Buffy the Vampire Slayer did." However, writing for gay entertainment website AfterElton.com, Hartinger argued that the show "de-gayed" the romantic aspect between David and Jack — David and Jonathan in the biblical telling — as well as turning Jack into a stereotypical villain.

Other reviewers were less positive. In a scathing review, Ray Richmond of The Hollywood Reporter said that Kings "takes an utterly straight-faced and painfully earnest approach to the kind of broad nighttime soap opera that once fueled Dallas and (especially) Dynasty through the 1980s, but to watch something so anal-retentive and full of itself in the new century can't help but play as unintended farce." Nancy deWolf Smith of The Wall Street Journal also compared the series unfavorably to the work of Aaron Spelling, and accused the series of "deadening pretentiousness" and "a failure of imagination". However, many reviewers, while criticizing the drama's stylized dialogue or calling its biblical themes "pretentious", praised Ian McShane's kingly performance and the show's ambitions.

=== Ratings ===
The March 15, 2009, NBC premiere of Kings was watched by 6.47 million viewers in the first hour, and 5.71 million in the second hour. This was significantly lower than the ratings for NBC's programming on the previous Sunday, a Saturday Night Live clip show and a segment of Celebrity Apprentice. Mediaweek magazine noted that "one year earlier in this block, the second half of a two-hour edition of Dateline and a repeat of Law & Order was considerably stronger at an average 6.3/10 in the overnights." TV.com speculated that NBC underpromoted the show causing the lackluster pilot episode rating.

Due to the unexpectedly rocky start, several media commentators predicted that Kings would be cancelled or have the already-filmed episodes "burned off" on another night, such as Saturday. NBC Entertainment co-chairman Ben Silverman was optimistic about the series' prospects:

I'm hoping because intent [to view] went up and awareness went up after it aired, clearly people responded to it, and it grew over its two hours. That gives me some hope. It's just hard to launch things that are not obvious. We may get nailed for it, but I'm proud of the show, and we need to keep taking chances like that.

However, commentators pointed out that Silverman's remarks about the audience growth were "misleading" and noted that the show cost "$10 million [for] Sunday's two-hour debut and is [costing] another $4 million per episode, an extravagant sum for any show and especially so given the program drew only 6 million viewers overall."

The first hour-long episode of the series was broadcast on March 22, 2009, and endured further degradation in the ratings (1.3 rating /3 share), "down another 19% in the 18–49 demo" and "running a distant fourth among the [four] broadcast net[work]s".

After airing only four episodes, Kings was officially pulled from NBC's Sunday schedule. The remaining episodes were to air on Saturday evening. On its first post-Kings Sunday, NBC aired a two-hour episode of Dateline NBC, enjoying an immediate near-doubling of their Sunday audience (from 3.6 million viewers to 6.4 million viewers). After only one Saturday broadcast, NBC announced that the remaining episodes will air in the summer, from June 13 to July 25.

Michael Green suggested that confused marketing and a weak launch contributed to the show's demise. He also described the move to Saturdays as "the first step of cancellation".

U.S. Nielsen ratings:

Order	Episode	Rating	Share	Rating/share (18–49)	Viewers (millions)	Rank (Night)	Rank (Timeslot)	Rank (Week)
1 & 2	"Goliath"	3.9	6	1.6/4	6.07	9	3	55
3	"Prosperity"	2.9	5	1.3/2	4.60	13	4	67
4	"First Night"	3.0	5	1.9/3	4.51	13	5	61
5	"Insurrection"	2.5	4	1.1/3	3.61	13	4	59
6	"Judgment Day"	1.5	3	0.6/2	2.41	7	4	64
7	"Brotherhood"	0.9	2	0.3/1	1.59	10	4	39
8	"The Sabbath Queen"	1.2	3	0.5/2	1.94	11	4	28
9	"Pilgrimage"	1.0	3	0.4/2	1.54	11	4	41
10	"Chapter One"	1.1	3	0.3/1	1.30	10	4	34
11	"Javelin"	1.2	2	0.4/2	1.64	11	4	36
12	"The New King (Part 1)"	1.0	2	0.4/2	1.57	11	4	38
13	"The New King (Part 2)"	1.3	3	0.4/2	1.80	10	3	38
