= Chance Hurstfield =

Canadian actor

- Born: Vancouver, British Columbia, Canada
- Other name: Chance H. Hurstfield
- Occupation: Actor
- Years active: 2011–present
- Parents: Adam Hurstfield; Aby Cervantes

Chance Hurstfield is a Canadian actor from Vancouver, British Columbia. He began screen-acting in 2011 at the age of four, securing numerous roles across film, television, and voice-over animation throughout his childhood. He is best known for his roles as Daniel "Danny" Dixon in the ABC television drama series A Million Little Things and Billy Wenan in the 2020 dark comedy film Fatman.

== Early life ==
Hurstfield was born in Vancouver, British Columbia, to music producer-director Adam Hurstfield (also known as Adam H.) and Aby Cervantes. His acting career began in 2011 at age four, and he recorded early on in his father's XOXO Entertainment Corp. studio environment. He was educated through online school, reaching Grade 9 by late 2020.

== Career ==
Hurstfield's early career included minor and guest roles in projects such as the TNT mystery movie Innocent (playing Richard Schiff's son), Mark & Russell's Wild Ride, Darc, and the Netflix series Project Mc².

His breakout television work includes portraying Danny Dixon in the ABC family drama series A Million Little Things starting in 2018, and a guest-star role in the Netflix original series Ghost Wars, which won him a Joey Award and scored him a nomination at the UBCP/ACTRA union's awards event. He also made a brief appearance in the Seth Rogen-produced comedy film Good Boys.

As a voice actor, Hurstfield has voiced Harold Humdinger in PAW Patrol, Buddy in Season 5 of Dinosaur Train and Spud in the animated series Chip and Potato. In 2020, he co-starred as Billy, an overachieving and malicious wealthy child, opposite Mel Gibson and Walton Goggins in the feature film Fatman.

== Filmography ==
=== Film ===
Year	Title	Role	Notes
2011	Innocent	Richard Schiff's son	Television movie
2015	Mark & Russell's Wild Ride	—	
2018	The Package	Aiden	
2018	Eggplant Emoji	—	Feature film
2018	Darc	—	Netflix movie
2019	Good Boys	Atticus	
2020	Fatman	Billy Wenan	Feature film

=== Television ===
Year	Title	Role	Notes
2011	RSA Academy	Himself	Unsold reality series; 1 episode
2017	Project Mc²	—	Episode: "No Laughing Matter"
2016	Christmas List	Kyle	Television film
2017	The Perfect Catch	Wesley	Television film
2017	Ghost Wars	Marcus Moon	Recurring role; Joey Award winner
2017	Nina's World	Carlos	Recurring voice role
2018–2023	A Million Little Things	Danny Dixon	Main role
2018–2020	PAW Patrol	Harold Humdinger	Recurring voice role
2018–2022	Chip and Potato	Spud	Recurring voice role
2019	Pup Academy	Corazon, Leon Kovalicadingo	Main voice role
2019–2020	Dinosaur Train	Buddy	Main voice role (season 5)
2022	Are You Afraid of the Dark?	Ferris Poe	4 episodes
2026	She Stole My Son's Heart	Gabriel Sanchez	Television film
