= Incorporated (TV series) =

2016 American science fiction drama

- Genre: Drama; Science fiction
- Created by: David & Alex Pastor
- Starring: Sean Teale; Allison Miller; Eddie Ramos; Julia Ormond; Dennis Haysbert; David Hewlett; Ian Tracey
- Country of origin: United States
- Original language: English
- No. of seasons: 1
- No. of episodes: 10

Production
- Executive producers: Ted Humphrey; Matt Damon; Ben Affleck; Jennifer Todd
- Producer: Margaret Chernin
- Camera setup: Single-camera
- Running time: 45 minutes
- Production companies: Pearl Street Films; Algorithm Entertainment; Universal Cable Productions; CBS Television Studios

Original release
- Network: Syfy
- Release: November 30, 2016 – January 25, 2017

Incorporated is an American science fiction drama television series. The show premiered November 30, 2016, on Syfy. Before its official premiere, Syfy released an advance preview of the first episode online on November 16, 2016. The show concluded on January 25, 2017.

On February 27, 2017, the series was cancelled after one season.

== Premise ==
The series takes place in a dystopian Milwaukee in the year 2074, where many countries have gone bankrupt due to a number of crises and climate change. In the absence of effective government, powerful multinational corporations, like MicroStrategy, have become de facto governments, controlling areas called Green Zones. The remaining territories are called Red Zones, where governance is weak or non-existent.

== Plot ==
Ben Larson is a manager at Spiga Biotech, the largest corporation in the world. He works for Elizabeth, the estranged mother of his wife, Laura. In reality, he is a climate refugee from the Red Zone outside Milwaukee whose real name is Aaron. Aaron has infiltrated the Green Zone, assuming the identity of Ben Larson to search for his childhood love Elena, who through a series of unfortunate circumstances has become a high-end prostitute at an exclusive brothel for senior Spiga executives. Aaron resolves to work his way up to a senior position in order to access Arcadia and rescue her. After framing his boss Chad for stealing classified information and ensuring his dismissal from the company, Aaron endeavours to obtain the promotion to the now-vacant position and rescue Elena, all while maintaining his Ben Larson cover in the face of increasingly paranoid Spiga security scrutiny and competitive coworkers. He is assisted by Theo, Elena's brother who is still living in the Red Zone, and Reed, another Red Zone denizen who managed to assume a Green Zone persona years before Aaron managed the same feat.

== Cast ==
- Sean Teale as Ben Larson/Aaron Sloane
- Allison Miller as Laura Larson, a cosmetic surgeon and Ben's wife
- Eddie Ramos as Theo Marquez
- Julia Ormond as Elizabeth Krauss, Laura's mother and a high-ranking executive in Spiga
- Dennis Haysbert as Julian, the head of security
- Damon Herriman as Jonathan Hendrick/Henry Reed, a climate refugee hiding in human resources
- Douglas Nyback as Roger Caplan
- Denyse Tontz as Elena Marquez, Theo's sister, Aaron's true love, a prostitute
- Ian Tracey as Terrence
- Mif as Wallace
- Martin Roach as Lionel
- David Hewlett as Chad Peterson

== Episodes ==
No.	Title	Directed by	Written by	Original release date	US viewers (millions)
1	"Vertical Mobility"	Alex Pastor & David Pastor	Alex Pastor & David Pastor	November 30, 2016 (Note: The first episode was released online on November 16, 2016.)	0.52
2	"Downsizing"	Jeff Woolnough	Ted Humphrey	December 7, 2016	0.54
3	"Human Resources"	Alex Pastor & David Pastor	Alex Pastor & David Pastor	December 14, 2016	0.57
4	"Cost Containment"	David Grossman	Chris Downey	December 21, 2016	0.54
5	"Profit and Loss"	Daniel Stamm	Story by : Mike Batistick; Teleplay by : Joshua Hale Fialkov & Aiyana White	December 28, 2016	0.46
6	"Sweating the Assets"	Nick Gomez	Allison Moore	January 4, 2017	0.42
7	"Executables"	Darnell Martin	Michael Batistick & Joshua Hale Fialkov	January 11, 2017	0.50
8	"Operational Realignment"	Christoph Schrewe	Qui Nguyen & Patrick Moss	January 18, 2017	0.41
9	"Burning Platform"	David J. Frazee	Molly Nussbaum & Aiyana White	January 25, 2017	0.55
10	"Golden Parachute"	Kelly Makin	Alex Pastor & David Pastor	January 25, 2017	0.41

== Home media ==
On June 20, 2017, CBS DVD (distributed by Paramount) released the entire series on DVD in Region 1.

== Broadcast ==
The series premiered November 30, 2016, on Syfy and in Canada on Showcase.

== Production ==
Georgina Haig played the female lead in the pilot but left and Allison Miller was cast in her place.

== Reception ==
The series has received a 75% rating on Rotten Tomatoes, the site's critical consensus reading: "Incorporated's impressive production values, solid performances, and engaging vision of a bleak future outweigh a predictable, clichéd narrative."

== Awards and nominations ==
Year	Award	Category	Nominee	Result
2017	Saturn Awards	Best Science Fiction Television Series	Incorporated	Nominated
