= Elizabeth Laime =

American comedian

- Born: September 19, 1979 (age 46); Houston, Texas, U.S.
- Education: University of California, Santa Barbara
- Occupations: Comedian, writer, podcast personality
- Spouse: Andrew Rosen (m. 2008)
- Children: 2
- Website: www.totallylaime.com

Elizabeth Laime (born September 19, 1979) is an American writer, actress and podcast host. She currently hosts the podcast Totally Laime formerly of the Earwolf network. Her former podcasts include Totally Married, a relationship advice show, and Totally Mommy, a show about parenting. She has written for the TruTV comedy series I'm Sorry, the NBC series The Village. and the ABC series A Million Little Things.

== Early life ==
Laime was born on September 19, 1979, in Houston, Texas. She moved to St. Louis, Missouri when she was ten and stayed there until she was eighteen. On December 19, 1998, Laime's mother died from pancreatic cancer. At the time of her mother's death Laime was at her debutante ball, an event that her mother insisted that she go through with despite her condition. Upon leaving her mother Laime realized that, "I knew (crying) when I was saying goodbye to her that I was like saying goodbye." Ten months later, on the anniversary of her parents' wedding, her father died of a heart attack. She graduated from UC Santa Barbara at 20 years old and after a few years moved to New York City.

== Career ==
During her time in New York, Laime got involved with the Upright Citizens Brigade Theatre and joined the sketch Maude team Gunderson! in 2007 She also put up a one-woman show Dear Diary at the UCB Theatre in New York City and Los Angeles and was a Time Out New York critics' pick. Her short story of a failed athletic endeavor, "Swim Team 1996", was published in the book Rejected. In the film Hotel Artemis Laime plays the voice on the Anxiety Tape.

=== Podcasting career ===
In 2010, Laime released the first episode of the podcast Totally Laime. She hosted the show with her husband Andy Rosen and would chat with a guest, usually an actor or improviser from the Los Angeles comedy scene. Rosen's title on the show is "Psychic Andy" a derivation of his original title as "Sidekick Andy". Segments on the show included Rapidfire a quick-hit question and answer segment where the guest would say "Totally" if they like the word and "Lame" if they didn't, The Oprah Game where Laime would read the synopsis of an episode of The Oprah Winfrey Show and ask for the guest's thoughts on it, and Questions From a Cup where guests would pull questions at random out of a cup.

In 2011, Totally Laime won the Earwolf Challenge, a reality podcasting competition where the winner was awarded a distribution contract with Earwolf. Totally Laime joined the Earwolf network and was part of the network until the show first ended in January 2015. Whitney Matheson, writing in USA Today, listed Totally Laime in her personal top ten comedy podcasts. Los Angeles Magazine included Totally Laime in their "Best of LA" list of best podcasts. Totally Laime was picked by E! Online as one of the 10 best things in pop culture for the week of July 7, 2013.

Totally Laime ran for 260 episodes until it first ended in January 2015. In explaining her decision to end the show, Laime stated that "it feels like the right time (to end the show)" and cited other reasons such as the responsibility of taking care of her child, working on her writing job and difficulty in booking guests.

In 2018, Totally Laime was rebooted and started releasing new episodes again. No longer with the Earwolf network, the podcast is released independently as were Totally Married and Totally Mommy. The tone and format of the show is largely unchanged with only the Oprah Game being replaced by Questions From a Cup. The show retains the tagline "Asking the most important people the least important questions."

Totally Married was a podcast that Laime hosted with her husband Andy Rosen from 2012 to 2018. This show did not feature guests and covered the married life of Laime and Rosen. The couple also answered questions about life and marriage submitted by listeners. The show ran for 335 episodes and ended in February 2018.

Totally Mommy was another podcast that Laime hosted from 2014 to 2016. The show originally featured a rotating co-host each week but eventually settled on a permanent co-host Vanessa Ragland. The show covered parenting stories from the hosts' personal lives and answered questions submitted by listeners. The show ran for 146 episodes and ended in November 2016.

=== Writing career ===
In 2015, Laime wrote and developed a comedy project Crystal with ABC Studios under a production deal with Casey Wilson and June Diane Raphael. The show would center on "Crystal, a hustler from the wrong side of the trailer park who, fresh out of prison, lands a job in the suburbs as an in-home health aide. Despite having no education, experience or vaccinations, she is determined to succeed at her job and change her life." ABC ended up passing on the project and did not order it to pilot.

In 2016, Laime teamed up with Tami Sagher to co-develop and co-write a comedy project Totally Laime with CBS. Totally Laime was inspired by Laime and her husband Andy Rosen's relationship and the podcast Totally Laime. The show "focuses on a young couple who document their relationship through a podcast." CBS did not go forward with the project to pilot. In 2018 the script for Totally Laime was performed before a live audience and released as part of the Dead Pilot's Society podcast. The cast of the live table read included Jason Ritter, Jamie Denbo, and Lucas Neff.

In 2018, Laime was hired as a staff writer on the TruTV comedy series I'm Sorry. In 2018 Laime was hired as a writer on the NBC series The Village.

== Personal life ==
Laime lives in Southern California and is married to music producer Andy Rosen. Laime and Rosen were childhood friends and went to the same middle school in St. Louis. Laime had a crush on Rosen but they lost touch when Rosen's family moved to Idaho in eighth grade. The two reunited in New York City as young adults and began a relationship shortly thereafter. The couple has one daughter and one son. She also has one older sister and two nephews. She is an animal rights advocate and supports gun control.

In 2018, Laime came forward along with 15 other women in a CNN article accusing New York City voice acting coach Peter Rofé of sexual assault and misconduct. Laime says Rofé sexually harassed her in 2005 when she took voice lessons with him.
