= Lizzy Greene =

American actress (born 2003)

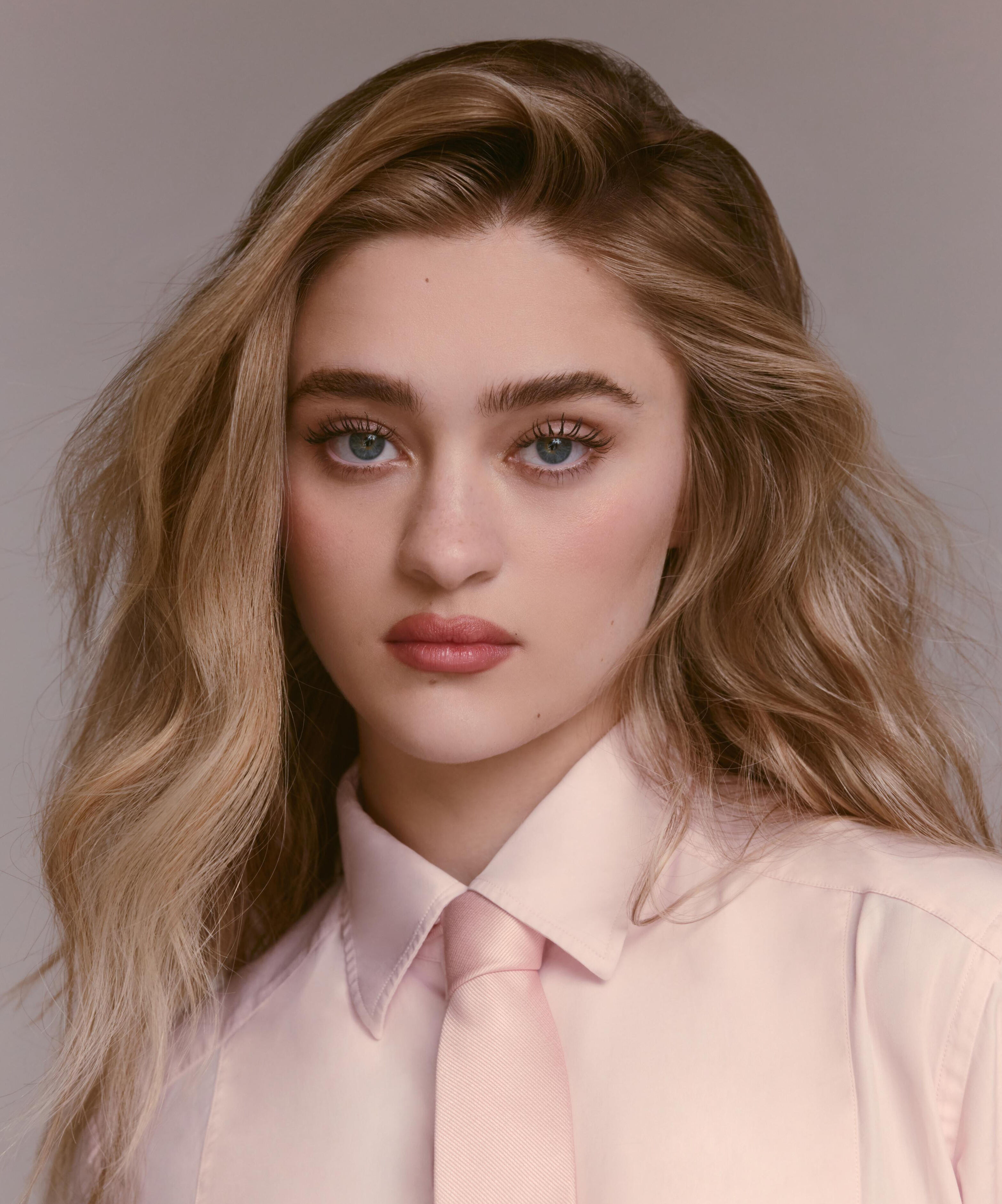
- Born: Elizabeth Anne Greene; May 1, 2003 (age 23); Dallas, Texas, U.S.
- Occupation: Actress
- Years active: 2014–present
- Website: lizzygreene.com

Elizabeth Anne Greene (born May 1, 2003) is an American actress. She is best known for her titular role as Dawn Harper in the Nickelodeon comedy sitcom Nicky, Ricky, Dicky & Dawn from 2014 to 2018. She has also starred as Sophie Dixon in the ABC family drama A Million Little Things from 2018 to 2023 and Lauren Brigman in the Netflix series Ransom Canyon from 2025 to 2026.

== Life and career ==
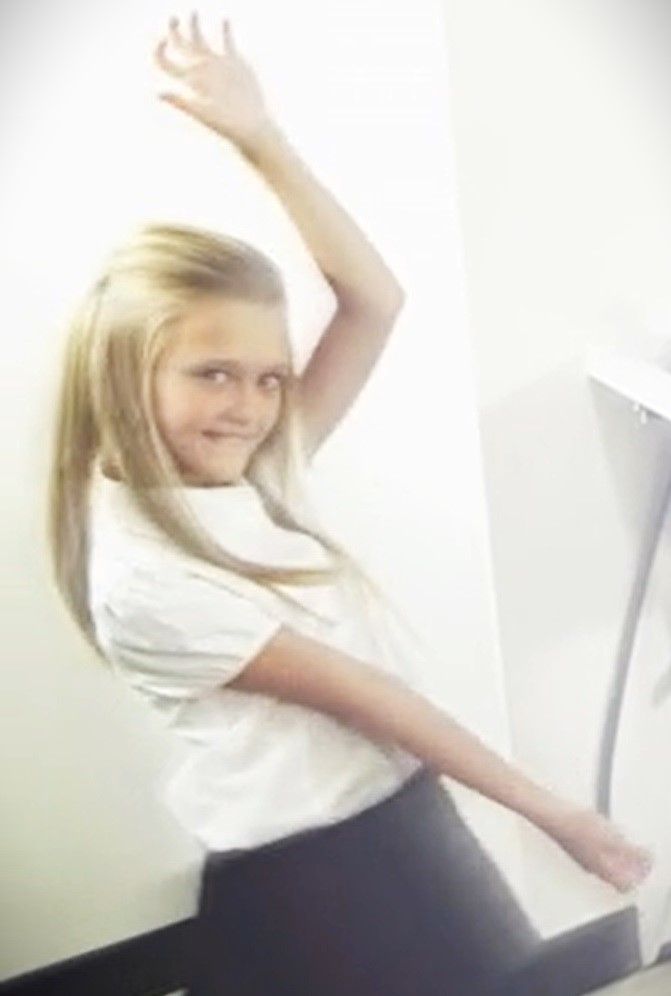
Greene on Who Runs This Show? in 2013

Greene was born on May 1, 2003, in Dallas, Texas. She made her television debut in the Nickelodeon sitcom Nicky, Ricky, Dicky & Dawn in the title role of Dawn Harper, the only girl among quadruplets. The show ran from September 13, 2014, to August 4, 2018. In 2018, she was cast as Sophie Dixon in the ABC drama A Million Little Things.

On January 18, 2024, it was announced that Greene would be starring in the Netflix series Ransom Canyon alongside actors Josh Duhamel, Minka Kelly, James Brolin, and Eoin Macken.

== Filmography ==
=== Film ===
Year	Title	Role	Note
2023	Hollow	Beth	Short
2026	The Internship	Renee	
TBA	The 99'ers	Kristine Lilly	

=== Television ===
Year	Title	Role	Note
2014–2018	Nicky, Ricky, Dicky & Dawn	Dawn Harper	Main role, 82 episodes
2014	Damaged Goods	Young Nicole	Television film
2014	The Thundermans	Morgan	Episode: "Pheebs Will Rock You"
2016	Paradise Run	Herself	Contestant, 6 episodes
2017	Tiny Christmas	Barkley	Television film
2018–2023	A Million Little Things	Sophie Dixon	Main role
2018	Knight Squad	Shadow Ghost	Episode: "Fright Knight"
2019	Cousins for Life	Natalie	Episode: "Scammer Time"
2025–2026	Ransom Canyon	Lauren Brigman	Main role

==== Television specials ====
Year	Title	Role	Note
2015	Nickelodeon's Ultimate Halloween Costume Party	Herself	
2015	Nickelodeon's Ho Ho Holiday	Herself	
2017	Nickelodeon's Not So Valentine's Special	Herself / various characters	
2017	Nickelodeon's Sizzling Summer Camp Special	Herself	
2017	Nickelodeon's Ultimate Halloween Haunted House	Herself / Hot	

== Awards and nominations ==
Award	Year	Category	Work	Result	Ref.
Nickelodeon Kids' Choice Awards	2016	Favorite TV actress	Nicky, Ricky, Dicky & Dawn	Nominated	
Nickelodeon Kids' Choice Awards	2017	Favorite female TV star	Nicky, Ricky, Dicky & Dawn	Nominated	
Nickelodeon Kids' Choice Awards	2018	Favorite female TV star	Nicky, Ricky, Dicky & Dawn	Nominated	
Young Artist Award	2016	Outstanding Young Ensemble Cast in a TV Series (Note: Shared with Aidan Gallagher, Casey Simpson & Mace Coronel)	Nicky, Ricky, Dicky & Dawn	Nominated	
