= A Million Little Things =

American family drama television series (2018–2023)

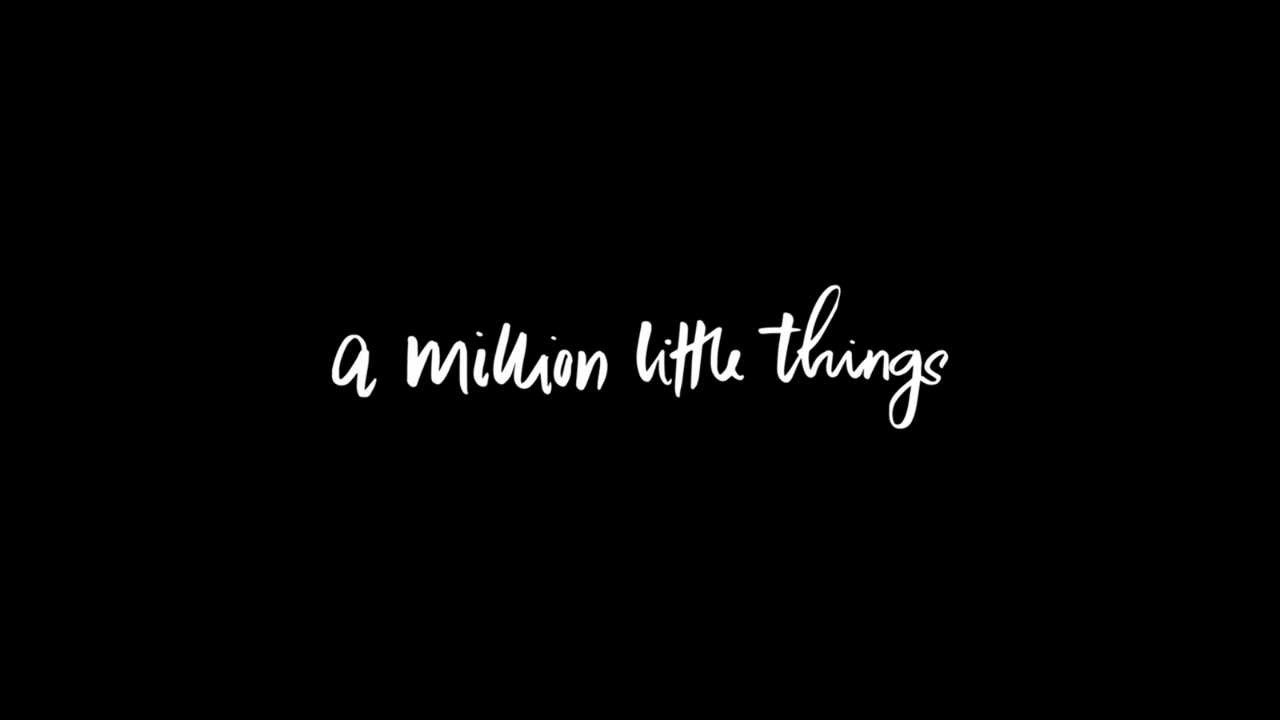
- Genre: Family drama; Romance
- Created by: DJ Nash
- Starring: David Giuntoli; Romany Malco; Allison Miller; Christina Moses; Grace Park; James Roday Rodriguez; Stéphanie Szostak; Tristan Byon; Lizzy Greene; Chance Hurstfield; Floriana Lima
- Composer: Gabriel Mann
- Country of origin: United States
- Original language: English
- No. of seasons: 5
- No. of episodes: 87 (list of episodes)

Production
- Executive producers: DJ Nash; Aaron Kaplan; Dana Honor; James Griffiths; Marshall Boone; David Marshall Grant; Terrence Coli; Brian Morewitz
- Production location: Vancouver, British Columbia
- Cinematography: Bryce Fortner; G. Magni Ágústsson; Giovani Lampassi; Stewart Whelan; Kyle Jewell; Larry Reibman; Robin Lindala
- Editors: Andrew Doerfer; David Berman; Jamin Bricker; Bryan Lamoureux; Lauren Connelly; Lawrence Maddox; Alyssa Carroll; Eric Lea; Sebastiaan Gregoir; Christopher Kroll
- Camera setup: Single-camera
- Running time: 41–43 minutes
- Production companies: Next Thing You Know Productions (Note: Credited as Fee-Fi-Fo... ...Next Thing You Know through season 1); ABC Signature (Note: Credited as ABC Studios through season 2); Kapital Entertainment

Original release
- Network: ABC
- Release: September 26, 2018 – May 3, 2023

A Million Little Things is an American family drama television series created by DJ Nash for ABC. Produced by ABC Signature and Kapital Entertainment, it features an ensemble cast including David Giuntoli, Grace Park, Romany Malco, Christina Moses, Allison Miller, James Roday Rodriguez, Stéphanie Szostak, Tristan Byon, Chance Hurstfield and Lizzy Greene. The series aired from September 26, 2018 until May 3, 2023, across five seasons and 87 episodes.

== Premise ==
In Boston, a tight-knit circle of friends is shocked after a member of the group unexpectedly dies by suicide. The friends realize that they need to finally start living life as they cope with their loss. The title is a reference to the saying "Friendship isn't a big thing – it's a million little things".

== Cast and characters ==
=== Main ===
Actor	Character	Seasons				
Actor	Character	1	2	3	4	5
David Giuntoli	Eddie Saville	Main	Main	Main	Main	Main
Romany Malco	Rome Howard	Main	Main	Main	Main	Main
Allison Miller	Maggie Bloom	Main	Main	Main	Main	Main
Christina Moses	Regina Howard	Main	Main	Main	Main	Main
Christina Ochoa	Ashley Morales	Main (Note: Christina Ochoa is credited through 1x13.)				
Grace Park	Katherine Kim	Main	Main	Main	Main	Main
James Roday Rodriguez	Gary Mendez	Main	Main	Main	Main	Main
Stephanie Szostak	Delilah Dixon	Main (Note: Stephanie Szostak is credited through 4x01.)	Main	Main	Main	Recurring
Tristan Byon	Theo Saville	Main	Main	Main	Main	Main
Lizzy Greene	Sophie Dixon	Main	Main	Main	Main	Main
Chance Hurstfield	Danny Dixon	Recurring	Main	Main	Main	Main
Floriana Lima	Darcy Cooper		Recurring	Main	Recurring	

- David Giuntoli as Eddie Saville, a musician, music teacher and stay-at-home dad who is a recovering alcoholic having marital problems with Katherine. He is the father of Theo and Charlie
- Romany Malco as Rome Howard, an aspiring filmmaker who yearns to accomplish something more meaningful with his life
- Allison Miller as Maggie Bloom, a therapist and Gary's love interest who survived breast cancer
- Christina Moses as Regina Howard, a chef who wants to open her own restaurant
- Christina Ochoa as Ashley Morales (season 1), Jon's assistant who is keeping a secret
- Grace Park as Katherine Kim, who used to be the fun one of the group, but now juggles her career as a lawyer with parenting her son, Theo, while trying to repair her marriage
- James Roday Rodriguez as Gary Mendez, a friend of Eddie, Jon, and Rome, and Maggie's love interest who also survived breast cancer. His birth name is revealed in season 3 to be Javier Mendez, Jr.
- Stéphanie Szostak as Delilah Dixon (seasons 1–4; recurring season 5), Jon's widow and mother of Sophie, Danny and Charlie
- Tristan Byon as Theo Saville, Eddie and Katherine's son, and Charlie's older half-brother
- Lizzy Greene as Sophie Dixon, Jon and Delilah's oldest child, Danny's older sister and Charlie's older half-sister
- Chance Hurstfield as Danny Dixon (seasons 2–5; recurring season 1), Jon and Delilah's son, Sophie's younger brother, and Charlie's older half-brother
- Floriana Lima as Darcy Cooper (season 3; recurring season 2, 4), Gary's new love interest, divorcée mother of Theo's classmate Liam, and a veteran of military service in Afghanistan experiencing PTSD

=== Recurring ===
- Ron Livingston as Jon Dixon (season 1; guest season 2–3, 5), a successful businessman who unexpectedly takes his own life
- Constance Zimmer as Jeri Huntington (season 1), a councilwoman
- Bodhi Sabongui as Elliot (season 1; guest season 2), Danny's crush and later boyfriend
- Henderson Wade as Hunter (season 1), Katherine's co-worker
- Sam Pancake as Carter French, Katherine's legal assistant
- Drea de Matteo as Barbara Nelson (seasons 1–2), a mysterious woman from Jon's past
- Chandler Riggs as PJ Nelson (season 2; guest season 1), a young man who befriends Rome, later revealed to be Barbara Morgan's son
- Melora Hardin as Patricia Bloom (seasons 2, 4; guest season 1), Maggie's mother
- Rhys Coiro as Mitch Nelson (season 2; guest season 1), Barbara's husband
- Jason Ritter as Eric (season 2), a man who claims to have Maggie's deceased brother's heart. He later reveals that the heart actually went to his fiancée, who was killed in a motorcycle crash that Eric caused
- Lou Beatty Jr. as Walter Howard (season 2–present; guest season 1), Rome's father
- Ebboney Wilson as Eve (season 2), a young pregnant woman planning on giving up her baby for Rome and Regina to adopt
- Anna Akana as Dakota (season 2; guest season 3, 5), a young musician with whom Eddie produced music
- Chris Geere as Jamie (season 3), Maggie's Oxford roommate and friend with benefits
- Mattia Castrillo as Liam (seasons 3–4), a classmate of Theo's who is Darcy's son with her ex-husband
- Adam Swain as Tyrell (season 3–5) an industrious teenager taken in by Rome and Regina after his mother is deported to Haiti
- Andrew Leeds as Peter Benoit (seasons 3–4), a music instructor who mentors Sophie when she attempts to get accepted into the exclusive music college MMI, and subsequently sexually abuses her
- Erin Karpluk as Anna Benoit (seasons 3–4; guest season 5), Peter's wife and later Eddie's love interest
- Karen Robinson as Florence (season 3; guest season 5), a woman Walter meets in the cemetery and subsequently starts a relationship with
- Terry Chen as Alan (season 3), a lawyer with whom Katherine forms a friendship and possible romantic relationship as her marriage to Eddie falls apart
- Nikiva Dionne as Shanice Williamson (seasons 3–4), a well-known actress and closeted bisexual woman who agreed to star in Rome's film before the COVID pandemic shut it down; she later becomes a potential love interest for Katherine
- Michael Patrick Thornton as Russ (season 4), a physical trainer who helps Eddie and who is a paraplegic in a wheelchair
- Ryan Hansen as Camden Lamoureux (season 4), a Boston Bruins player whom Maggie is dating
- Andrea Navedo as Valerie Sandoval (season 4; guest season 5), Regina's employee
- Stephnie Weir as Jane Goodman (season 4), a radio station manager who hires Maggie to give therapy advice on the station
- Cameron Esposito as Greta Strobe (seasons 4–5), Katherine's former high school best friend who later becomes her girlfriend and wife
- Bresha Webb as Dr. Jessica Bruno (seasons 5)
- David Walton as Colton Cutler (seasons 5)

=== Guest ===
- Sam Huntington as Tom (seasons 1 and 4), a man Maggie dated when she lived in Chicago, described as a "mystery man" from her past in early press
- Gerald McRaney (season 1) and Paul Guilfoyle (season 2) as Lenny Farache, Delilah's father and Sophie, Danny, and Charlie's grandfather who has Alzheimer's disease
- L. Scott Caldwell as Renee Howard (seasons 1–2), Rome's mother
- Romy Rosemont as Shelly (seasons 1–4), Regina's mother
- James Tupper as Andrew Pollock (seasons 1–2), Regina and Delilah's financial partner in the restaurant
- Tyler Cody as Jake Anderson (seasons 2–3), Sophie's boyfriend who works at Regina and Delilah's restaurant
- Marcia Gay Harden as Alice (season 2), Gary's estranged mother
- Sutton Foster as Chloe (season 2), Eric's deceased fiancée
- Olivia Steele Falconer as Alex Stewart (season 2), Eddie's deceased high school love interest
- Gerard Plunkett as Joseph Stewart (seasons 2–3), Alex and Colleen's father
- Betsy Brandt as Colleen (season 2), the sister of Eddie's deceased high school love interest
- Andrea Savage as Dr. Stacy (season 3; voice only seasons 1 and 4), a therapist and radio talk show host
- Paul Rodriguez as Javier Mendez (season 3), Gary's father
- Azie Tesfai as Cassandra Thomas (season 4)
- Mario Van Peebles as Ronald (season 4), Regina's father
- JoBeth Williams as Lana Strobe (season 5), Greta's mother

== Episodes ==
Season	Episodes	Originally released	
Season	Episodes	First released	Last released
1	17	September 26, 2018	February 28, 2019
2	19	September 26, 2019	March 26, 2020
3	18	November 19, 2020	June 9, 2021
4	20	September 22, 2021	May 18, 2022
5	13	February 8, 2023	May 3, 2023

== Production ==
=== Development ===
It's an optimistic look at how the loss of a friend is the impetus for the other seven to finally start living, to make a promise to him and to themselves to finally be honest about what's really going on,... I know in my own life, my friend's passing is a constant reminder to keep things in perspective.

— Creator D.J. Nash, on the underlying themes of the series.

On August 18, 2017, ABC landed a series titled A Million Little Things with a put pilot commitment, to be written by DJ Nash, who would serve as executive producer alongside Aaron Kaplan and Dana Honor. The series was described as "being in the tone of The Big Chill," with the title stemming from the popular adage, "Friendship isn't a big thing – it's a million little things." Nash came up with the idea for the series following his single-camera comedy pilot Losing It. He said that "Sometimes in comedy, you have to apologize for adding drama, which is why I was so thrilled to see ABC's passion for a drama that has comedy." ABC officially ordered the series to pilot in January 2018, and the show was officially picked up to series on May 9, 2018. The series is produced by ABC Studios and Kapital Entertainment. In October 2018, the show was picked for a full season of 17 episodes.

On February 5, 2019, during the TCA press tour, A Million Little Things was renewed for a second season. On August 8, 2019, it was announced that ABC had ordered a full season for the second season. On May 21, 2020, ABC renewed the series for a third season. At the PaleyFest New York panel, Nash announced that the COVID-19 pandemic and the Black Lives Matter movement will be part of the storylines for the third season. On May 14, 2021, ABC renewed the series for a fourth season of 20 episodes. On May 13, 2022, ABC renewed the series for a fifth season. On November 7, 2022, ABC announced that the fifth season would be its final season.

=== Casting ===
On February 6, 2018, David Giuntoli was cast as Eddie. A week later, Romany Malco was cast as Rome. By the end of the month, Christina Ochoa had joined the cast as Ashley, along with Anne Son as Katherine, Christina Moses as Regina Howard, and James Roday Rodriguez as Gary. In early March 2018, Stéphanie Szostak was cast as Delilah, while Lizzy Greene was cast as Sophie Dixon. That month, it was also revealed that Ron Livingston had joined the series in an unspecified role, which was revealed with the series order in May to be the character Jon. On June 27, 2018, Grace Park was cast as Katherine, replacing Anne Son who was in the original pilot.

=== Filming ===
Production on the pilot took place from March 12 to 29, 2018, in Vancouver, British Columbia. Principal photography for the first season began on July 24, 2018, and concluded on February 4, 2019. Filming for the second season began on June 19, 2019, and ended on February 19, 2020. Filming for the third season began on August 27, 2020, and ended on May 12, 2021. Production on the fourth season began on July 27, 2021, and concluded on April 13, 2022. Filming for the fifth season began on September 7, 2022, and concluded on March 3, 2023.

=== Music ===
The soundtrack for the first season was released digitally on March 1, 2019, by Hollywood Records.

== Release ==
=== Broadcast ===
The series premiered on September 26, 2018 on ABC. The second season premiered on September 26, 2019. The third season premiered on November 19, 2020. The fourth season premiered on September 22, 2021. The fifth and final season premiered on February 8, 2023. In Canada, the series aired on Citytv for the first three seasons before moving to the W Network. In Turkey, the series broadcast through pay broadcaster Digiturk. In Germany, it streams on Disney+. In Australia, it streams on Stan and Paramount+.

=== Home media ===
The first season was released on DVD in Region 1 on August 27, 2019.

== Reception ==
=== Critical response ===
On review aggregation Rotten Tomatoes, the series holds an approval rating of 53% with an average rating of 6.34/10, based on 32 reviews. The website's critical consensus reads, "Despite a decent ensemble and a few intriguing elements, A MillIon Little Things breaks under the weight of its own emotionally lofty ambitions." Metacritic, which uses a weighted average, assigned the series a score of 51 out of 100 based on 18 critics, indicating "mixed or average reviews".

=== Ratings ===
==== Overall ====
Viewership and ratings per season of A Million Little Things
Season	Timeslot (ET)	Episodes	First aired		Last aired		TV season	Viewership rank	Avg. viewers (millions)	18–49 rank	Avg. 18–49 rating
Season	Timeslot (ET)	Episodes	Date	Viewers (millions)	Date	Viewers (millions)	TV season	Viewership rank	Avg. viewers (millions)	18–49 rank	Avg. 18–49 rating
1	Wednesday 10:00 pm (1–10); Thursday 9:00 pm (11–17)	17	September 26, 2018	5.07	February 28, 2019	5.26	2018–19	49	7.78	20	2.0
2	Thursday 9:00 pm (1–9); Thursday 10:00 pm (10–19)	19	September 26, 2019	4.99	March 26, 2020	4.27	2019–20	47	7.26	20	1.6
3	Thursday 10:00 pm (1–8); Wednesday 10:00 pm (9–16, 18); Wednesday 9:00 pm (17)	18	November 19, 2020	4.04	June 9, 2021	2.48	2020–21	57	5.24	34	1.0
4	Wednesday 10:00 pm	20	September 22, 2021	2.09	May 18, 2022	1.83	2021–22	62	4.06	57	0.6
5	Wednesday 10:00 pm	13	February 8, 2023	2.21	May 3, 2023	2.03	2022–23	66	3.67	68	0.5

=== Awards and nominations ===
Year	Award	Category	Nominee(s)	Result	Ref.
2019
2019	Image Awards	Outstanding Supporting Actor in a Drama Series	Romany Malco	Nominated	
2019	Television Academy Honors	Outstanding Programs and Storytellers Advancing Social Change Through Television	A Million Little Things	Won	
2020	Guild of Music Supervisors Awards	Best Song Written and/or Recorded for Television	Song: All These Things That I've Done for episode 101 Pilot (2018)	Nominated	
2021	The ReFrame Stamp	2020–21 Top 200 Most Popular Television Recipients	A Million Little Things	Won	
2023	HCA TV Awards	Best Writing in a Broadcast Network or Cable Drama Series	DJ Nash & James Roday Rodriguez, for episode 5x13 One Big Thing	Nominated	
2023	Humanitas Prize	Drama Teleplay	DJ Nash & James Roday Rodriguez, for episode 5x13 One Big Thing	Nominated	
2023	3rd Astra TV Awards	Best Writing in a Broadcast Network or Cable Series, Drama	DJ Nash & James Roday Rodriguez, for episode 5x13 One Big Thing	Nominated	
