= Allison Miller =

American actress (born 1985)

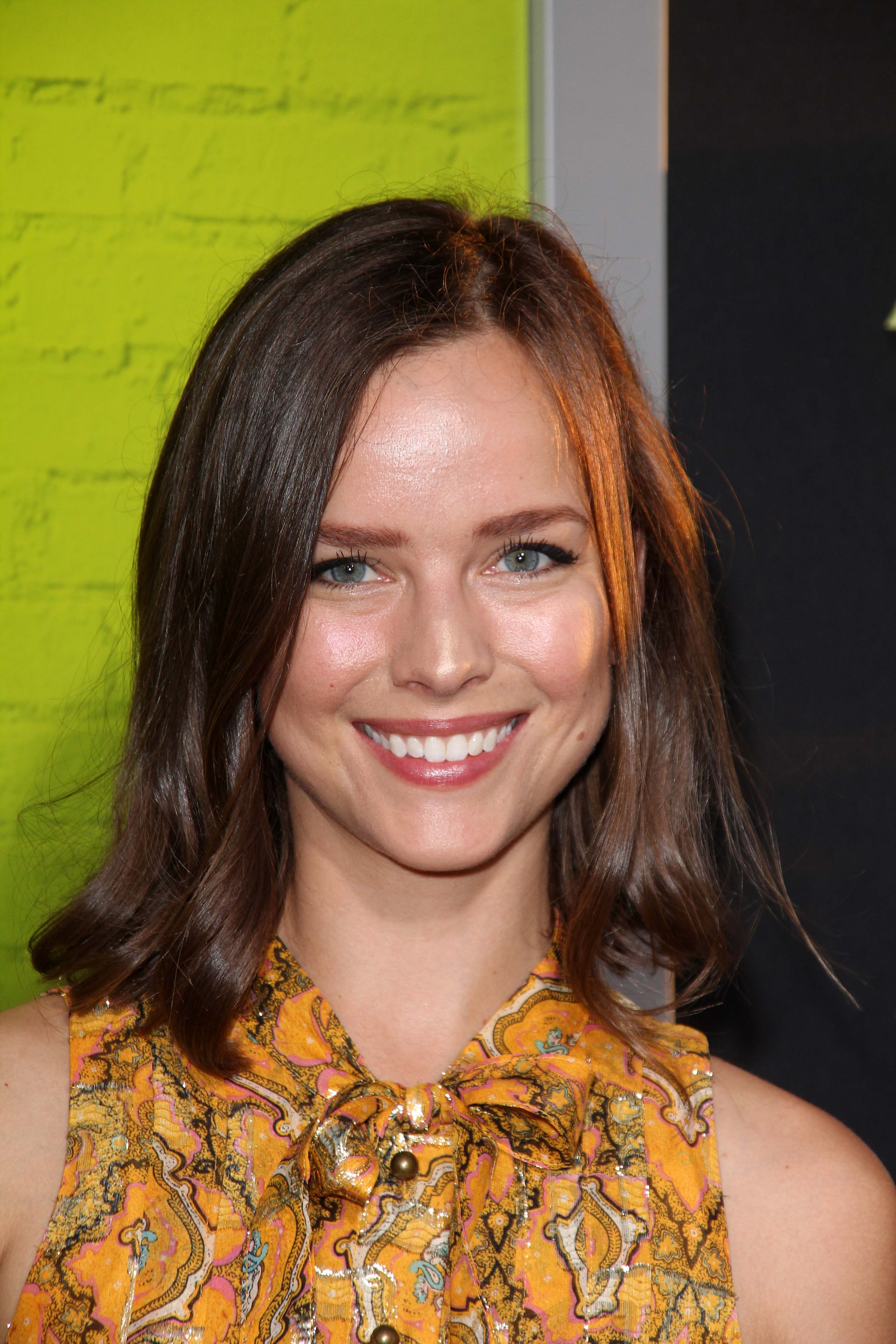
- Miller in 2012
- Born: September 2, 1985 (age 40); Rome, Italy
- Occupation: Actress
- Years active: 2006–present
- Spouse: Adam Nee (m. 2012; sep. 2019)

Allison Miller (born September 2, 1985) is an American actress. She is best known for playing Michelle Benjamin on the NBC series Kings, Skye Tate on the Fox series Terra Nova, Carrie on the NBC series Go On, and Dr. Maggie Bloom in ABC's A Million Little Things. She starred as Laura Larson on the Syfy television series Incorporated.

== Early life ==
Miller was born in Rome, Italy, to American parents Margo and John Winn Miller. Her father is the former publisher of The Olympian newspaper in Olympia, Washington.

During her childhood, Miller moved often, growing up mostly in Lexington, Kentucky, before starting high school in State College, Pennsylvania, and finishing at Maclay School in Tallahassee, Florida.

Miller briefly attended Boston University before attending Rhodes College for her freshman year, and then transferring to the University of Florida in Gainesville. She is a member of Kappa Delta sorority, and was featured in a story in Kappa Delta's newsletter The Angelos.

In 2006, Miller dropped out of college and moved to Hollywood to pursue her acting career full-time. She has training in voice and tap, jazz, and modern dance. She is a mezzo-soprano and plays the piano and the guitar. She is proficient in Italian and French.

== Career ==
Miller started her career as member of the Young Actors Theatre in Tallahassee, Florida. She appeared as Nora in the play Brighton Beach Memoirs for the theatre.

Miller first appeared on television In 2004, when she was one of eight actresses chosen as finalists to play Laurie in the VH-1 reality show In Search of the New Partridge Family. Other television roles included an appearance in Lucy's Piano (2006) and episodes of General Hospital, CSI: NY, Desperate Housewives, and Boston Legal, and Cold Case in 2006. Miller appeared as a series regular on the NBC television drama series Kings, which was based on the biblical story of David. She portrayed Princess Michelle Benjamin, an analogue of Michal (daughter of Saul and first wife of David). The series lasted only one season.

Miller appeared in two 2009 films: a live action version of Blood: The Last Vampire and 17 Again.

In 2011, Miller co-starred as Skye Tate in the single season of the series Terra Nova. In 2012, she started appearing in the NBC comedy Go On, which was cancelled after one season.

In 2014, Miller starred in Devil's Due, a found-footage horror film.

Miller played the lead role in the drama film There's Always Woodstock, released March 19, 2014 at the Gasparilla International Film Festival.

Miller had a recurring role as Julia Howser in the ABC sitcom Selfie, which was cancelled after its sixth episode.

Miller starred in the Syfy television series Incorporated.

She played the role of Sonya Struhl, a lawyer who defends Liberty High School in the second season of the Netflix original series 13 Reasons Why. The second season was released on May 18, 2018.

Her latest series was on the ABC drama, A Million Little Things, which ended after five seasons in 2023.

Her most recent role was on Season 24, Episode 17 ("A Perfect Family") of NBC's Law & Order.

== Personal life ==
Miller married comedian and actor Adam Nee in 2012. In January 2019, the couple announced that they were filing for divorce. Miller currently lives in Los Angeles.

== Filmography ==
Film and television
Year	Title	Role	Notes
2006	Lucy's Piano	Lucy	Short film
2006	General Hospital	Teen Tracy	Episode: "1.10999"
2006	Mind of Mencia	Punk Girl	Episode: "The Serranos"
2006	Cold Case	Violet Polley (1928)	Episode: "Beautiful Little Fool"
2006	CSI: NY	'Omen' / Carensa Sanders	Episode: "Oedipus Hex"
2006	Desperate Housewives	Tanya	Episode: "Children and Art"
2007	Take	Shoe Sales Girl	
2007–2008	Boston Legal	Marlena Hoffman	Episodes: "No Brains Left Behind", "Guardians and Gatekeepers"
2009	17 Again	Teen Scarlet	
2009	Blood: The Last Vampire	Alice McKee	Lead role
2009	Kings	Michelle Benjamin	Main role (12 episodes)
2010	Betwixt	Celine Halstead	Unaired TV pilot
2010	Some of the Parts		Short film
2011	Pro-Semitism: Psychotherapy		Funny or Die short film
2011	Terra Nova	Skye Tate	Main role (13 episodes)
2012	Private Practice	Denise	Episode: "Too Much"
2012	Fact Checkers Unit	Becky	Episode: "James Franco Is Preggers"
2012–2013	Go On	Carrie	Recurring role (17 episodes)
2014	Devil's Due	Samantha McCall	Lead role
2014	Bad Teacher	Janet	Episode: "The 6th Grade Lock-In"
2014	Selfie	Julia	Recurring Role (6 episodes)
2014	There's Always Woodstock	Catherine Brown	
2015	Relationship Goals	Britney	Short film
2015	Strange Calls	Kath	Unaired TV pilot
2015	Ghosting	Holly	Short film
2016–2017	Incorporated	Laura	Syfy television series
2017	Salamander	Nora	TV movie
2018	13 Reasons Why	Sonya Struhl	Recurring role (10 episodes)
2018–2023	A Million Little Things	Maggie Bloom	Main role
2020	Psych 2: Lassie Come Home	Maisie	TV film
2020	About Us	Claudia Newman	
2025	Law & Order	Melinda Chapman	season 24 episode 17 "A Perfect Family"
