= Playwrights Horizons =

Off-Broadway theater in Manhattan, New York

Coordinates: 40°45′31″N 73°59′37″W

- Formation: 1971
- Founder: Robert Moss
- Type: Theatre group
- Purpose: Off-Broadway
- Artistic director: Adam Greenfield
- Website: www.playwrightshorizons.org
Playwrights Horizons
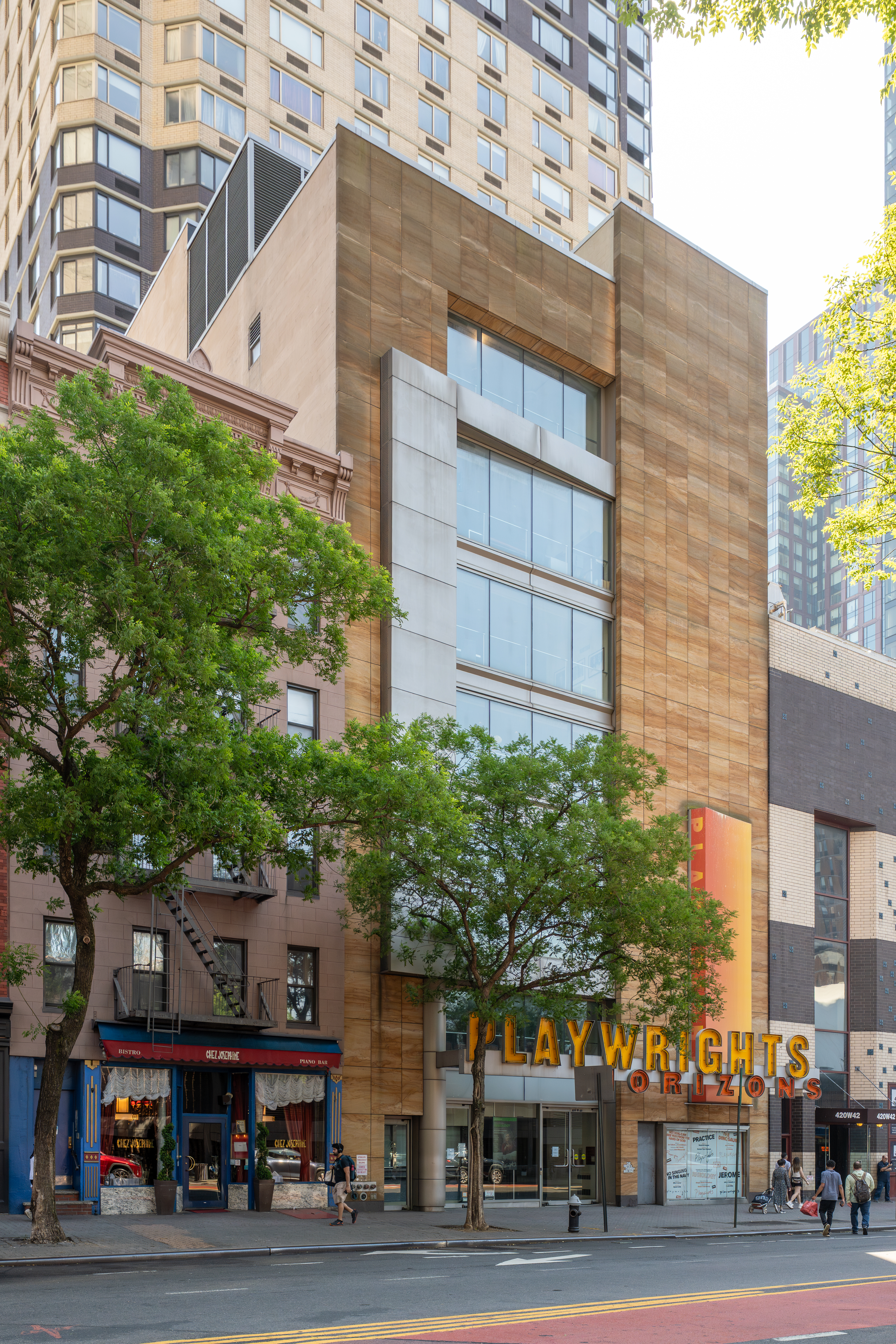
- Interactive map of Playwrights Horizons
- Address: 416 West 42nd Street; Manhattan, New York City; United States
- Capacity: Mainstage: 198; Peter Jay Sharp: 128

Playwrights Horizons is a not-for-profit American Off-Broadway theater located in New York City dedicated to the support and development of contemporary American playwrights, composers, and lyricists, and to the production of their new work. Founded in 1971, it is as of 2025 led by artistic director Adam Greenfield.

== History ==
Playwrights Horizons was founded in 1971 at the Clark Center by Robert Moss, before moving to 42nd Street in 1977 where it was one of the original theaters that started Theater Row by converting adult entertainment venues into off Broadway theaters. The current building was built on the site of a former burlesque, which previously served as the off-Broadway Maidman Playhouse between 1960 and 1966.

André Bishop served as artistic director from 1981 to 1991, followed by Don Scardino who served through 1995. Tim Sanford served as artistic director from 1996 until July 2020, serving as "outgoing artistic director" during the 2020-2021 season. Adam Greenfield took over as artistic director in July 2020. In 2023, managing director Leslie Marcus ended her 30-year tenure with the company, and Casey York was appointed to the position.

In 2005, Playwrights Horizons was among 406 New York City arts and social service institutions to receive part of a $20 million grant from the Carnegie Corporation, which was made possible through a donation by New York City mayor Michael Bloomberg.

In December 2025, a lawsuit was filed against Playwrights Horizon, alleging that a discount offered to patrons who identified as people of color was racially discriminatory. The plaintiff was represented by an attorney whose organization had filed 21 lawsuits in the previous two years. Playwrights Horizon issued a statement in response to the litigation, calling the lawsuit "meritless."

== Description and governance ==
Playwrights Horizons encourages the new work of veteran writers while nurturing an emerging generation of theater artists. Writers are supported through every stage of their growth with a series of development programs: script and score evaluations, commissions, readings, musical theater workshops, along with studio and mainstage productions.

Adam Greenfield took over as artistic director in July 2020, and Casey York became managing director in mid-2024.

== Auxiliary programs ==
Playwrights Horizons' auxiliary programs include the Playwrights Horizons Theater School, which is affiliated with NYU's Tisch School of the Arts, and Ticket Central, a central box office that supports the off-Broadway performing arts community. Designated to give undergraduate students a foundation within various fields of theater. The theater school is split between a traditional two year program, focusing on skills and techniques as a theater artist, and an advanced training program, which is meant to help students build a connection between undergraduate training and their independent careers.

Founded in 2010, Clubbed Thumb and Playwrights Horizons founded SuperLab, which aimed to support creative thinking by producing six new plays.

== Awards ==
Playwrights Horizons has worked with over 375 writers, and is the recipient of numerous awards and honors.

Past productions include seven Pulitzer Prize winners:

- Stephen Sondheim and James Lapine's Sunday in the Park with George (1985)
- Alfred Uhry's Driving Miss Daisy (1988)
- Wendy Wasserstein's The Heidi Chronicles (1989)
- Doug Wright's I Am My Own Wife (2004)
- Bruce Norris's Clybourne Park (2011)
- Annie Baker's The Flick (2014)
- Michael R. Jackson's A Strange Loop (2020)

List of Obie Awards:

Year	Category	Recipient(s)
1967	Special Citations	The Open Theatre
1977	Distinguished Productions	Eve Merriam, Tommy Tune, Kate Carmel, Cast
2005	Obie Grant	Gina Gionfriddo
2007	Obie Grant	Young Jean Lee
2016	Special Citations: Collaboration	Annie Baker (Playwright)
2016	Special Citations: Collaboration	Dominique Morisseau (Playwright)
2019	Special Citations	Clare Barron (Playwright), Lee Sunday Evans (Director)
2020	Playwriting	Michael R. Jackson
2020	Playwriting	Will Arbery
2020	Special Citation	Creative Team and Ensemble of Heroes of the Fourth Turning
2020	Special Citation	Creative Team and Ensemble of A Strange Loop
2022	Design	Reza Behjat
2022	Direction	Taylor Reynolds
2023	Design	Enver Chakartash (Costumes)
2023	Direction	Dustin Wills
2023	Playwriting	Bruce Norris
2023	Special Citations	Design Team: Kate Noll, Cha See, Haydee Zelideth Antuñano, Tei Blow, John Gasper, Nick Hussong
2023	Sustained Achievement in Directing	Pam MacKinnon
2023	Sustained Achievement in Performance	K. Todd Freeman
2023	Sustained Achievement in Performance	Shannon Tyo
2024	Special Citations	Milo Cramer, Morgan Green
2024	Sustained Achievement in Design	Jian Jung (Set)
2024	Sustained Achievement in Directing	Sarah Benson
2024	Sustained Achievement in Performance	Greg Keller

== Notable productions ==
Notable productions include:

- Assassins – Stephen Sondheim and John Weidman
- Betty's Summer Vacation and Sister Mary Ignatius Explains It All For You – Christopher Durang
- Circle Mirror Transformation and The Flick – Annie Baker
- Clybourne Park and The Pain and the Itch – Bruce Norris
- Dance Nation — Clare Barron
- Detroit – Lisa D'Amour
- Floyd Collins – Adam Guettel and Tina Landau
- Grey Gardens – Doug Wright, Scott Frankel, and Michael Korie
- Goodnight Children Everywhere and Franny's Way – Richard Nelson
- Heroes of the Fourth Turning – Will Arbery
- In Trousers, March of the Falsettos, and Falsettoland – William Finn
- James Joyce's The Dead – Richard Nelson and Shaun Davey
- Lobby Hero – Kenneth Lonergan
- Marvin's Room – Scott McPherson
- Prince Faggot – Jordan Tannahill
- The Dining Room – A.R. Gurney
- The Substance of Fire – Jon Robin Baitz
- The Thanksgiving Play — Larissa FastHorse
- Stereophonic – David Adjmi
- A Strange Loop – Michael R. Jackson
- Sunday in the Park with George – James Lapine and Stephen Sondheim
- Violet – Jeanine Tesori and Brian Crawley
