= Aggie Guerard Rodgers =

American costume designer

- Born: December 26, 1943 (age 82); Fresno, California, U.S.
- Occupation: Costume designer
- Children: 2, including James Laxton

Aggie Guerard Rodgers (born December 26, 1943) is an American costume designer. She is best known for creating the costumes for Richard Marquand's epic space opera film Return of the Jedi (1983) and for Tim Burton's fantasy horror comedy film Beetlejuice (1988).

At the 58th Academy Awards, she was nominated for an Academy Award in the category Best Costume Design for the film The Color Purple (1985).

== Selected filmography ==
Year	Title	Director	Notes
1973	American Graffiti	George Lucas	
1974	The Conversation	Francis Ford Coppola	
1975	One Flew Over the Cuckoo's Nest	Miloš Forman	
1976	Alex & the Gypsy	John Korty	
1977	Three Warriors	Kieth Merrill	
1978	Invasion of the Body Snatchers	Philip Kaufman	
1979	More American Graffiti	Bill L. Norton	
1983	Return of the Jedi	Richard Marquand	with Nilo Rodis-Jamero
1984	The Adventures of Buckaroo Banzai Across the 8th Dimension	W. D. Richter	
1985	Cocoon	Ron Howard	
1985	Pee-wee's Big Adventure	Tim Burton	
1985	Warning Sign	Hal Barwood	
1985	The Color Purple	Steven Spielberg	
1987	The Witches of Eastwick	George Miller	
1987	Fatal Beauty	Tom Holland	
1987	Leonard Part 6	Paul Weiland	
1987	Batteries Not Included	Matthew Robbins	
1988	Beetlejuice	Tim Burton	
1988	My Stepmother Is an Alien	Richard Benjamin	
1989	In Country	Norman Jewison	
1990	I Love You to Death	Lawrence Kasdan	
1991	Late for Dinner	W. D. Richter	
1991	Grand Canyon	Lawrence Kasdan	
1992	Forever Young	Steve Miner	
1993	Benny & Joon	Jeremiah S. Chechik	
1993	The Fugitive	Andrew Davis	
1995	Wings of Courage	Jean-Jacques Annaud	
1995	Something to Talk About	Lasse Hallström	
1995	Mr. Holland's Opus	Stephen Herek	
1996	Jack	Francis Ford Coppola	
1997	Inventing the Abbotts	Pat O'Connor	
1997	The Rainmaker	Francis Ford Coppola	
1998	Holy Man	Stephen Herek	
1999	The Hurricane	Norman Jewison	
2001	Evolution	Ivan Reitman	
2001	Rock Star	Stephen Herek	
2002	Life or Something Like It	Stephen Herek	
2003	Holes	Andrew Davis	
2004	The Assassination of Richard Nixon	Niels Mueller	
2004	Raise Your Voice	Sean McNamara	
2005	Rent	Chris Columbus	
2006	Believe in Me	Robert Collector	
2008	Pig Hunt	James Isaac	
2009	La Mission	Peter Bratt	
2010	Leonie	Hisako Matsui	
2011	The Double	Michael Brandt	
2012	Tales of Everyday Magic	Michael A. Goorjian	
2013	Fruitvale Station	Ryan Coogler	
2015	Quitters	Noah Pritzker	
2015	The Boat Builder	Arnold Grossman	
2016	Pushing Dead	Tom E. Brown	
2017	American Paradise	Joe Talbot	Short film
2017	Phoenix Forgotten	Justin Barber	
2020	Bad Therapy	William Teitler	
2020	Love Is Love Is Love	Eleanor Coppola	Segments: "Sailing Lesson" and "Late Lunch"
2023	Avenue of the Giants	Finn Taylor	

== Awards and nominations ==
Award	Year (Note: Indicates the year of ceremony. Each year is linked to the article about the awards held that year, wherever possible.)	Category	Work	Result	Ref.
Academy Awards	1986	Best Costume Design	The Color Purple	Nominated	
Costume Designers Guild Awards	2006	Excellence in Period Film	Rent	Nominated	
Costume Designers Guild Awards	2015	Career Achievement Award	—N/a	Honored	
Saturn Awards	1984	Best Costume Design	Return of the Jedi	Won	
