= Robin Weigert =

American actress

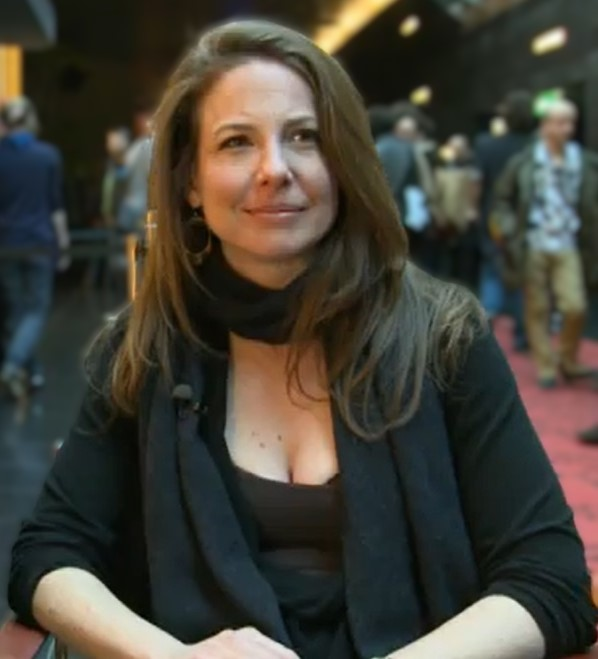
- Weigert at the 2013 Berlin International Film Festival
- Born: Washington, D.C., U.S.
- Education: Brandeis University (BA); New York University (MFA)
- Occupation: Actress
- Years active: 1998–present
- Website: robinweigert.com

Robin Weigert is an American television and film actress. She is best known for portraying Calamity Jane on the television series Deadwood (2004–2006), for which she received a nomination for the Primetime Emmy Award for Outstanding Supporting Actress in a Drama Series in 2004, Ally Lowen in Sons of Anarchy (2010–2013), Dr. Amanda Reisman in Big Little Lies (2017–2019), and Abby in Concussion (2013). She had a small role in HBO's acclaimed miniseries Angels in America in 2003.

== Early life and education ==
Weigert was born in Washington, D.C. She is the daughter of Dionne Laufman and Wolfgang Oscar Weigert, a psychiatrist. After graduating from Brandeis University in 1991, Weigert attended New York University, earning a Master of Fine Arts degree in the Graduate Acting Program at the Tisch School of the Arts. She is Jewish.

== Career ==
Weigert's theatre work includes Broadway productions of Twelfth Night directed by Nicholas Hytner; and Michael Frayn's Noises Off. In the 2010 Signature Theater Company revival of Tony Kushner's Angels in America, directed by Michael Greif, her performance as the Angel was praised as "full of tenderness and wit" by USA Today. Other theatre credits include Pride's Crossing, A Place at the Table, Hamlet, Arms and the Man, Goodnight Children Everywhere, The Seagull, Madame Melville (Drama Desk and Lucille Lortel Award nominations), as well as Jon Robin Baitz's Other Desert Cities at the Mark Taper Forum in 2012, directed by Robert Egan.

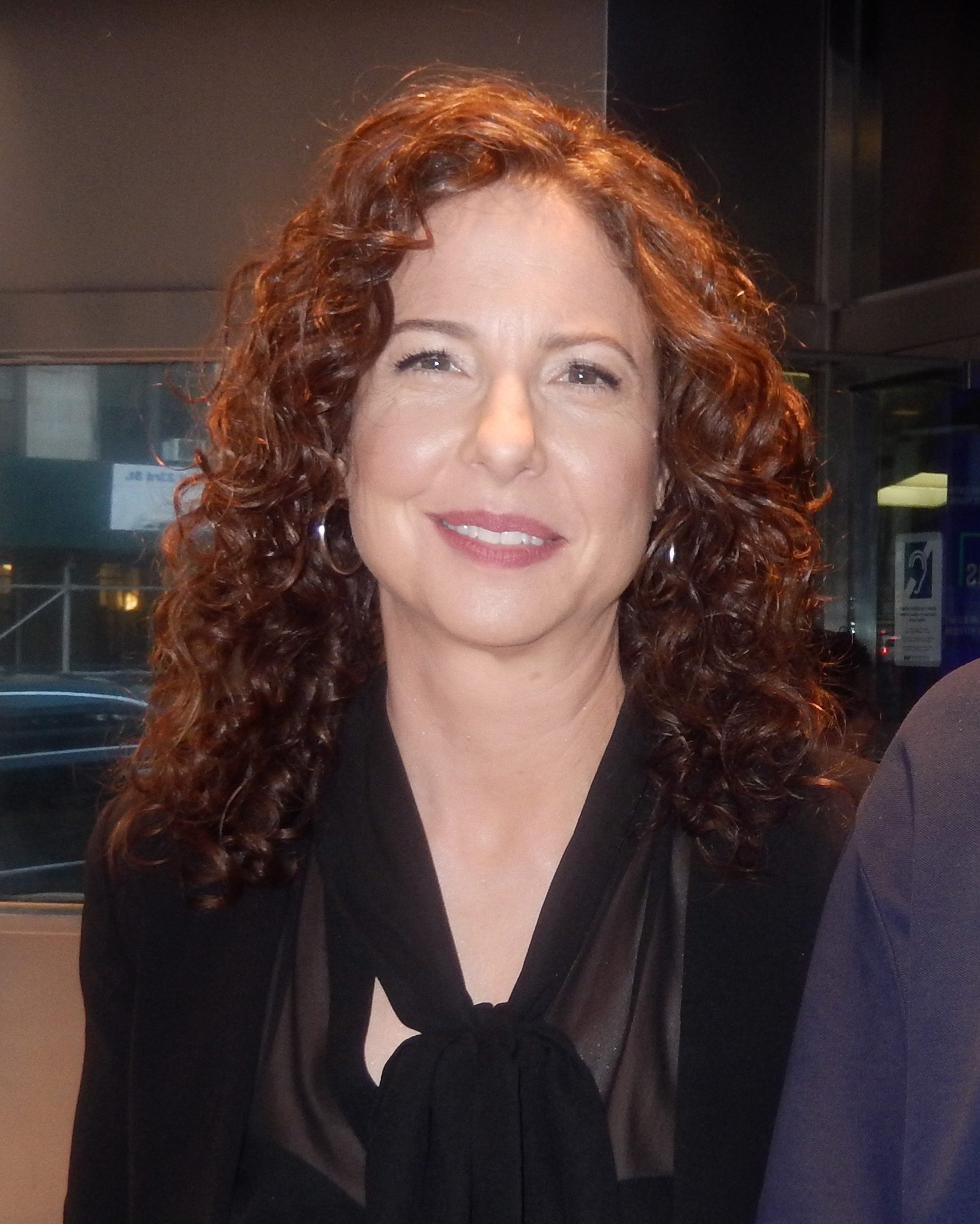
Weigert in 2019

After a decade as a stage actress based in New York City, Weigert moved to Los Angeles and has appeared in various films, television shows and mini-series. She is most recognizable from her Emmy-nominated portrayal of the iconic gunslinger Calamity Jane in the television series Deadwood, which ran on HBO from 2004 to 2006. In 2004, Weigert was nominated for an Emmy for Outstanding Supporting Actress in a Drama Series for the role. In 2006, she won Hollywood Life magazine's "Breakthrough of the Year" award. In 2019 she reprised the role in Deadwood: The Movie, which was nominated for 8 Emmy Awards, including Outstanding Television Movie.

Weigert played therapists in the box office hit Smile and opposite Nicole Kidman in the much-lauded HBO TV series Big Little Lies, attorneys in the popular cabler Sons of Anarchy and Jay Roach's biographical drama Bombshell, and strippers in Charlie Kaufman's Synecdoche, New York and Steven Soderbergh's black-and-white period drama The Good German. She was nominated for a Gotham Award for her portrayal of the central character, a housewife turned prostitute, in the award-winning indie Concussion, and was featured prominently in the Hulu miniseries We Were the Lucky Ones in which she plays the matriarch of a Polish Jewish family that survived the Holocaust. Series regular roles include Dietland for AMC with Julianna Margulies, NBC's Life with Damian Lewis, and CBS' Tracker with Justin Hartley.

In April 2024, David Canfield featured Weigert in the Vanity Fair "Always Great" series with an article titled, "How Robin Weigert Brings Herself to Her Most Indelible Roles".

== Bibliography ==
- The Whip (2012, as audiobook narrator)

== Filmography ==
=== Film ===
Year	Title	Role	Notes
1999	Heart to Heart.com	Whitney	
2001	The Sleepy Time Gal	Hospital Records	
2005	Loggerheads	Rachel	
2006	The Good German	Hannelore	
2007	Things We Lost in the Fire	Brenda	
2008	Synecdoche, New York	Adult Olive	
2009	The Private Lives of Pippa Lee	Aunt Trish	
2009	My One and Only	Hope	
2011	The Undying	Barbara Haughton	
2012	The Sessions	Susan	
2013	Concussion	Abby	Nominated—Gotham Independent Film Award for Breakthrough Actor; Nominated—Seattle International Film Festival Award for Best Actress
2013	Gods Behaving Badly	Vicky the Tree	
2014	Pawn Sacrifice	Regina Fischer	
2015	Take Me to the River	Cindy	
2015	Mississippi Grind	Dorothy	
2016	Pushing Dead	Paula	
2017	Please Stand By	Officer Doyle	
2017	New Money	Rose Tisdale	
2018	Cold Brook	Mary Ann	
2019	Bombshell	Nancy Erika Smith	
2022	Smile	Dr. Madeline Northcott; The Monstrosity	
2023	Our Son	Pam	
2023	Tokyo Cowboy	Peg	

=== Television ===
Year	Title	Role	Notes
1998	Twelfth Night, Or What You Will	—N/a	Television film
1999	Law & Order	Denise Luca	Episode: "Gunshow"
2000	Mary and Rhoda	Hostess	Television film
2003	Angels in America	Mormon Mother	Episode: "Perestroika: Beyond Nelly"
2003	Law & Order	Leanna Parks	Episode: "Seer"
2004–05	Cold Case	Anna Mayes	4 episodes
2004	Without a Trace	Adina Paphos	Episode: "Legacy"
2004	NYPD Blue	Donna Traylor	Episode: "Traylor Trash"
2004	Judging Amy	Tina Stewart	Episode: "Conditional Surrender"
2004–2006	Deadwood	Calamity Jane	30 episodes Nominated—Primetime Emmy Award for Outstanding Supporting Actress in a Drama Series; Nominated—Screen Actors Guild Award for Outstanding Performance by an Ensemble in a Drama Series
2005	CSI: Crime Scene Investigation	Dr. Diana Dino	Episode: "Committed"
2006	The Unit	Annette Terry	Episode: "The Kill Zone"
2006	Law & Order: Special Victims Unit	Heather Stark	Episode: "Recall"
2006	Numb3rs	Elaine Tillman	Episode: "Killer Chat"
2007	Lost	Rachel Carlson	2 episodes
2007–2008	Life	Lt. Karen Davis / Sgt. Karen Davis	11 episodes
2008	ER	Nicole	Episode: "The High Holiday"
2009	United States of Tara	Jenny	Episode: "Snow"
2009	Private Practice	Amelia Sawyer	2 episodes
2010	The Mentalist	Eliza Green	Episode: "Red Herring"
2010	Miami Medical	Nurse Carol	Episode: "Pilot"
2010	Law & Order	Catherine Douglas	Episode: "The Taxman Cometh"
2010–2013	Sons of Anarchy	Ally Lowen	15 episodes
2010	Hawthorne	Sara Adams	4 episodes
2011	Law & Order: LA	Hayden Tract	Episode: "Sister of the Gunman"
2011	Grey's Anatomy	Karen Lawrence	Episode: "Free Falling"
2012	American Horror Story: Asylum	Cynthia Potter	Episode: "Tricks and Treats"
2013	Chicago Fire	Erica Gradishar	Episode: "Let Her Go"
2013	Full Circle	Det. Karen Tanner	Episode: "Celeste & Tim"
2014	Chicago P.D.	Erica Gradishar	5 episodes
2014	Once Upon a Time	Bo Peep	Episode: "White Out"
2015	The Following	Judge Wallace	Episode: "A Hostile Witness"
2015	Law & Order: Special Victims Unit	Counselor Lisa Hassler	Episode: "Depravity Standard"
2015	Marvel's Jessica Jones	Wendy Ross-Hogarth	7 episodes
2016	Damien	Sister Greta Fraueva	6 episodes
2016	The Night Shift	Mrs. Dawson	Episode: "Between a Rick and a Hard Place"
2016	Transformers: Robots in Disguise	Scatterspike (voice)	2 episodes
2016	American Horror Story: Roanoke	Mama Polk	2 episodes
2017	Fearless	Heather Myles	6 episodes
2017, 2019	Big Little Lies	Dr. Amanda Reisman	9 episodes Nominated—Screen Actors Guild Award for Outstanding Performance by an Ensemble in a Drama Series
2018	Dietland	Verena Baptist	10 episodes
2018–2019	Berlin Station	Jamie Hudson	3 episodes
2019	Deadwood: The Movie	Calamity Jane	Television film
2019	Castle Rock	Chrysida Wilkes	3 episodes
2020	The Politician	Andi Mueller	Episode: "The Voters"
2021	American Horror Story: Double Feature	Martha Edwards	2 episodes
2022	Julia	Iris Wallace	Episode: "Petit Fours"
2024	Tracker	Teddi Bruin	Main role (season 1)
2024	We Were the Lucky Ones	Nechuma Kurc	Main role
2025	Will Trent	Rain Woods	2 episodes
2025	Gremlins	Calamity Jane (voice)	Episode: "Never Try the Cider"
2025	Monster: The Ed Gein Story	Enid Watkins	4 episodes
TBA	The Altruists	Barbara Fried	Upcoming series
