= Tom Gilroy =

American actor

Tom Gilroy is an American director, writer, actor, producer, playwright, poet, musician, and teacher. Gilroy has written, directed and produced five films, including the award-winning short Touch Base and the critically acclaimed feature Spring Forward. He has appeared in over 20 television shows and 30 films.

With his theatre company Machine Full, Gilroy has produced over a dozen critically acclaimed productions, most recently the multi-media production of Hamlet for the New Jersey Shakespeare Festival. Gilroy is also a published haiku poet, having authored the haiku year and Haiku, Not Bombs among others.

Gilroy has collaborated with Michael Stipe on several projects, including "Everything’s Coming Undone," for the compilation album Ciao My Shining Star, The Songs of Mark Mulcahy. He has performed as a musician on tracks by Stipe, Mark Mulcahy, Dub Gabriel, and Ariel Aparicio, whose album Aerials he produced.

Gilroy has also taught as a professor at Columbia University and Davidson College.

== Career ==
=== Directing ===
Tom Gilroy has written, directed and produced five films. Among them are three shorts, the award-winning Touch Base, Mr. Sycamore, and It Happened Today, his most recent collaboration with R.E.M.

He has also written and directed the critically lauded feature Spring Forward, starring Liev Schreiber, Ned Beatty, and Campbell Scott. His most recent feature film as writer/director is The Cold Lands, starring Lili Taylor, which premiered at the Berlinale Film Festival in 2013. The film also featured a book of photography and haiku, entitled Somebody Else’s Nowhere: Haiku and Images from The Cold Lands.

Gilroy is currently developing another feature-length film entitled Our Lady of the Snow, which recently won the prestigious San Francisco Film Society/KRF Grant and received fellowships from the Djerassi and McDowell colonies.

As a screenwriter, Gilroy was commissioned to write a feature film for Orange is the New Black's Nick Sandow. Entitled Star of the Sea, it will be Sandow’s third feature as a director.

=== Acting ===
Gilroy has appeared in over 20 television shows including Law & Order, Sex and the City, and Damages. He also acted in upwards of 30 films, having worked with such directors as Ken Loach, Sidney Lumet, Jean-Luc Godard, Lodge Kerrigan, Dan Minehan, Jim McKay, Christopher Munch, Ali Selim, Cam Archer, Paul Auster and multi-media artist Robert Longo.

He has also played dozens of characters on Wake Up, World, the long-running touring satire of morning news shows from the mind of The Daily Show creator Lizz Winstead, for which he was a writer and director.

=== Theater ===
Gilroy’s plays have been produced in several US cities and around the world. With his theatre company Machine Full (co-founded with Lili Taylor and Michael Imperioli), he has written numerous critically acclaimed plays, most notably The Invisible Hand and Halcion Days. His other works include Sugar Cane and Coffee Cup, Collateral Damage, American Lesion, Witch’s Tit, and The Invisible Hand.

In 2005 he directed Rosie Perez, Robert Sean Leonard, Natasha Lyonne, and Mary-Louise Parker in the play Nine Ten for the 24 Hour play project. He has also directed a production of Arthur Miller’s Incident At Vichy.

Most recently, Gilroy produced and directed the multi-media production of Hamlet for the New Jersey Shakespeare festival, starring Richard Harris, Jared Harris, and Lili Taylor.

=== Poetry ===
Gilroy has authored various haiku pieces, including the haiku year, Haiku, Not Bombs, the Festival Of Writers Haiku Project, and Somebody Else’s Nowhere, which features haiku and photography.

=== Music ===
Gilroy has collaborated with Michael Stipe on several projects, including "Everything’s Coming Undone," for the compilation album Ciao My Shining Star, The Songs of Mark Mulcahy. He has performed as a musician on tracks by Stipe, Mark Mulcahy, Dub Gabriel, and Ariel Aparicio, whose album Aerials he produced.

=== Academics ===
As a professor, Gilroy has taught at multiple prestigious institutions. He taught at Columbia University for five semesters, and at Davidson College for one.

Gilroy is a three-time MacDowell Fellow and a two-time Sundance Lab Fellow. He has also received the 2015 Kenneth Rainin Screenwriting Grant from the San Francisco Film Society and the Esteemed McGee Chair for Filmmaking at Davidson College. Gilroy also won the 2015 Djerassi Residency Award from the San Francisco Film Society.

== Filmography ==
=== Film ===
Year	Title	Role	Notes
1990	A Matter of Degrees	The Scuzz	
1991	This Film Is On	Lonely Man	
1994	Post Cards from America	Adult David's Friend	
1995	Land and Freedom	Lawrence	
1996	Girls Town	Richard Helms	
1996	Ratchet	Elliot Callahan	
1997	Inside/Out	David Sheppard	
1997	Vicious Circles	Morton	
1998	Spark	Jack	
1998	Lulu on the Bridge	Restaurant Man #1	
1998	Claire Dolan	Client #3 / $1000 Trick	
1999	Getting to Know You	Jimmy's Father	
1999	On the Run	Tom	
2000	Bread and Roses	Director of Campaigns	
2000	The Acting Class	—N/a	
2001	Series 7: The Contenders	Dawn's Cameraman	
2004	Harry + Max	Josiah	
2004	Everyday People	Erin's Professor	
2005	Shooting Vegetarians	Bailiff	
2005	Sweet Land	Comrade Vik	
2006	Wild Tigers I Have Known	The Principal	
2008	Dream Boy	Preacher John	
2009	The Blue Tooth Virgin	Louis	
2009	Don't Let Me Drown	Fireman #2	
2015	The World Made Straight	Mr. Anderson	
2016	Tom's Dilemma	Mr. Jacobson	

=== Television ===
Year	Title	Role	Notes
1989	Monsters	Nelson	Episode: "The Mother Instinct"
1997	Dellaventura	Paul Webb	Episode: "The Biggest Miracle"
1998	Remembering Sex	Ryan	Television film
1999	Sex and the City	Tom	Episode: "They Shoot Single People, Don't They?"
2000	Third Watch	Deranged Shooter	2 episodes
2001	Law & Order: Special Victims Unit	Cal Oman	Episode: "Sacrifice"
2002	100 Centre Street	Mitchell Fox	2 episodes
2009	Law & Order	Eric Johnson	Episode: "Chattel"
2009	Wake Up World	McStormy	Television film
2010	Damages	Director	Episode: "All That Crap About Your Family"
