= The Blue Tooth Virgin =

- Directed by: Russell Brown
- Written by: Russell Brown
- Produced by: Russell Brown; Roni Deitz
- Starring: Bryce Johnson; Austin Peck; Tom Gilroy; Lauren Stamile; Roma Maffia; Karen Black; Amber Benson
- Cinematography: Marco Fargnoli
- Edited by: Christopher Munch; Curtiss Clayton
- Distributed by: Regent Releasing
- Release date: September 25, 2009
- Running time: 79 minutes
- Country: United States
- Language: English

The Blue Tooth Virgin is a 2009 American comedy-drama independent film written and directed by Russell Brown. The film follows two writers whose friendship is tested through a conflict arising over a screenplay that one of them has written.

== Plot ==
The film is structured as seven scenes, each of them largely a dialogue between two characters. In the first scene, screenwriter Sam (Austin Peck) meets his friend, magazine writer and editor David (Bryce Johnson) in a coffee shop. Sam previously wrote and produced a well-reviewed but short-lived television series, but has been unable to sell anything recently. Sam asks David to read his new movie screenplay, a thriller entitled “The Blue Tooth Virgin,” and to provide him with feedback.

The second scene shows David at home as his friend Louis (Tom Gilroy) visits him. They talk over David’s dilemma about whether or not to tell Sam that he found the screenplay terrible and almost incomprehensible.

In the third scene, David and Sam talk about the screenplay while golfing. David tries to avoid directly criticizing Sam’s work, but Sam keeps pressing for feedback. When he learns that David found it confusing, Sam reacts angrily, eventually driving David to walk out.

The fourth scene is set at Sam’s home. Sam’s wife, Rebecca (Lauren Stamile), asks about the screenplay. She agrees with David’s critiques about the screenplay, and criticizes Sam’s defensiveness about honest feedback and his need for external validation. The argument escalates as Lauren questions the basis of their marriage.

The fifth scene takes place in the office of David’s therapist (Roma Maffia). They talk about a screenplay David is working on (his first attempt), why he wants to be a screenwriter, and how to deal with writer’s block. They also discuss Sam’s reaction to David’s criticism and whether the friendship is worth continuing.

In the sixth scene, Sam visits a script consultant named Zena (Karen Black) at her home. Using a form of drama therapy, she guides him to examine his own motives for writing, and then suggests to him that his screenplay isn't working because he's not yet ready to write it.

In the final scene, David and Sam meet again in the coffee house after not speaking for some time. They both apologize, and Sam says he's giving up writing, admitting that he doesn't really enjoy it. David reveals that he sold his own screenplay and it is on track to be produced by a studio. Sam expresses jealousy and bitterness over David’s success. They are interrupted by a fan (Amber Benson) who recognizes Sam and tells him what a positive impact his television show had on her life. The exchange reminds Sam why he started writing in the first place: to affect people and make them think.

== Critical reception ==
The Blue Tooth Virgin received mixed reviews. Ronnie Scheib of Variety described the film as a “simultaneously insightful and idiotic” minimalist film that “will likely please and alienate in equal measure." Kevin Thomas of Los Angeles Times considered it a “smart” movie, with “amusing line-drawing credits featuring an apt myth of Sisyphus image and its inserts of observations on writing from the likes of Samuel Johnson and Albert Camus” that “enables Brown to dig into the art-industry equation that is the eternal Hollywood challenge, as well as questions about values, priorities, standards, goals -- all leading to what is all-important: self-knowledge." Diego Semerene of Slant Magazine saw the film as having “interesting lines and situations” that ultimately morphed into an “alluring contrivance of clichés that safely spring the narrative forward.” Vincent Musetto of The New York Post described the film as "a series of long, talky, humorless takes, during which the old argument about art versus commerce comes to the fore.”

The Rotten Tomatoes rating for The Blue Tooth Virgin was 62% based on 13 reviews.
