= The Sleepy Time Gal =

2001 film by Christopher Münch

- DVD box art
- Directed by: Christopher Munch
- Written by: Christopher Munch
- Produced by: Ruth Charney; Christopher Munch
- Starring: Jacqueline Bisset; Martha Plimpton; Nick Stahl; Amy Madigan; Seymour Cassel; Frankie Faison
- Cinematography: Marco Fargnoli; Rob Sweeney
- Edited by: Annette Davey; Dody Dorn; Christopher Munch
- Distributed by: Antarctic Pictures
- Release date: January 24, 2001 (United States)
- Running time: 108 minutes
- Country: United States
- Language: English

The Sleepy Time Gal is a 2001 film written and directed by Christopher Munch. The film stars Jacqueline Bisset, Martha Plimpton, Nick Stahl, Amy Madigan, Seymour Cassel and Frankie Faison.

== Plot ==
Frances has enjoyed a variety of jobs during her adult life and is the mother of two sons, each by a different husband. She also gave birth to a daughter following an affair she had with a married man, Bob, but was forced by her mother, Anna, to give up the baby for adoption. Frances attempts to search for the child she gave away, but she is diagnosed with cancer before she is able to conduct a thorough search.

As Frances is attended by one of her sons Morgan, and a nurse, Maggie. She is unaware that her lost daughter, Rebecca, who is now a corporate lawyer is conducting her own search for her missing birth mother. Part of her search takes her to a Daytona Beach, Florida, radio station where Frances worked years ago as a late-night disc jockey under the moniker of the Sleepy Time Gal.

== Cast ==
- Jacqueline Bisset as Frances
- Martha Plimpton as Rebecca
- Nick Stahl as Morgan
- Amy Madigan as Maggie
- Seymour Cassel as Bob
- Frankie Faison as Jimmy Dupree
- Carmen Zapata as Anna
- Peggy Gormley as Betty
- Molly Price as Rebecca's colleague
- Justin Theroux as Rebecca's boyfriend

== Production ==
The Sleepy Time Gal was the third film directed by Christopher Munch, whose previous work included The Hours and Times (1991) and Color of a Brisk and Leaping Day (1996). Munch shot the film over a two-and-a-half-year period, and he later told an interviewer the extended stop-and-start shooting schedule was dictated by the lack of finances. Munch said, "I didn't have a big enough chunk of money at any one point to do the whole thing. It really was held together by chewing gum and a lot of care."

Munch also stated the inspiration for The Sleepy Time Gal was based on his mother's experience of giving birth to a baby girl out of wedlock and giving the infant away for adoption. But unlike the characters in his film, Munch made no attempt to actively locate his long-lost half-sister.

== Distribution ==
The Sleepy Time Gal was first shown at the 2001 Sundance Film Festival. However, it was not acquired by a major distributor for theatrical release. Later that year, it was cited by the Village Voice in its annual survey of the year's best undistributed films. The film had a television premiere instead of a theatrical debut, with a debut broadcast on the Sundance Channel on March 29, 2002.

After its television broadcast, The Sleepy Time Gal had several commercial theatrical screenings across the U.S.

== Critical reception ==
On Rotten Tomatoes, the film has a score of 82% based on 22 critics’ reviews. The site's consensus states, “A thoughtfully assembled drama brought to life by sensitive performances, Sleepy Time Gal offers an intriguing glimpse of a woman at a crossroads.”

When the film screened in New York City in May 2002, film critic Dennis Lim of the Village Voice praised Bisset's acting as a “candid and complex performance that for all its gossamer, death-haunted poetics…conveys the irreducible weight of a singular life.” Of a Chicago screening in November 2002, Chicago Sun-Times critic Roger Ebert praised Munch's screenplay for being “tenderly observant of his characters” and awarded the film 3 1/2 stars out of 4.

== Home media ==
The Sleepy Time Gal was released on DVD on January 28, 2003, by Sundance Home Channel Entertainment.
