= Tyler Neitzel =

American actor (born 1991)

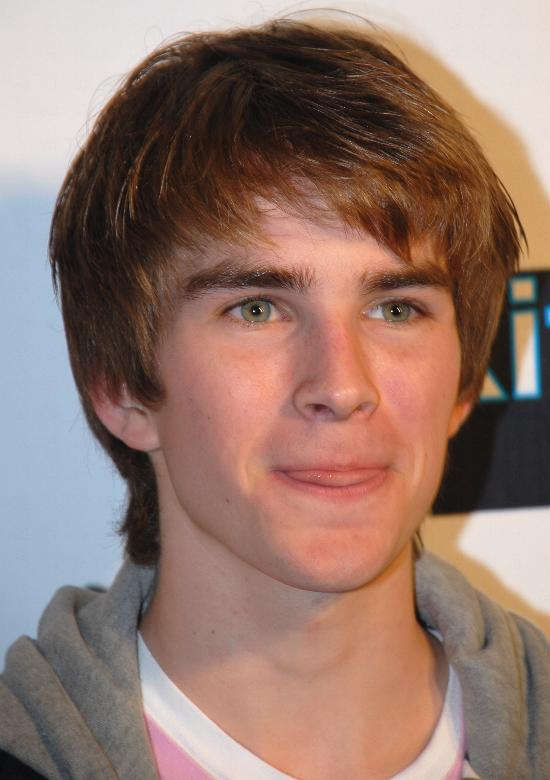
- Tyler Neitzel, 2010
- Born: September 19, 1991 (age 34); San Diego, California, U.S.
- Occupation: Actor
- Years active: 1998–present

Tyler Neitzel (born September 19, 1991) is an American actor. He played the role of Young King Leonidas in the Warner Brothers blockbuster film 300. He appeared in the 2 hour special (2010) of Brothers & Sisters (ABC) episode: 'Time After Time' as Young Aaron.

Recent feature films include Reconciliation, Freeway Killer and Signal Lost. Neitzel has appeared in numerous national television commercials, print ads, and has lent his voice to many radio and television commercials and voiceovers including the feature film, My Life in Ruins. He has appeared in such popular television shows as ER, Crossing Jordan and The Guardian. Some of his earlier works include roles in such feature films as The Big Brass Ring, playing William Hurt as a child, The Young Filmmaker's Club, Wednesday's Child, Black and Blue and Romantic Weirdos. He also made appearances on various television shows as Power Rangers, Prey, Crimestrike and The Disney Channel. He guest starred in Criminal Minds in 2012.

Neitzel was born in San Diego, California.
