= Bryce Johnson =

American actor (born 1977)

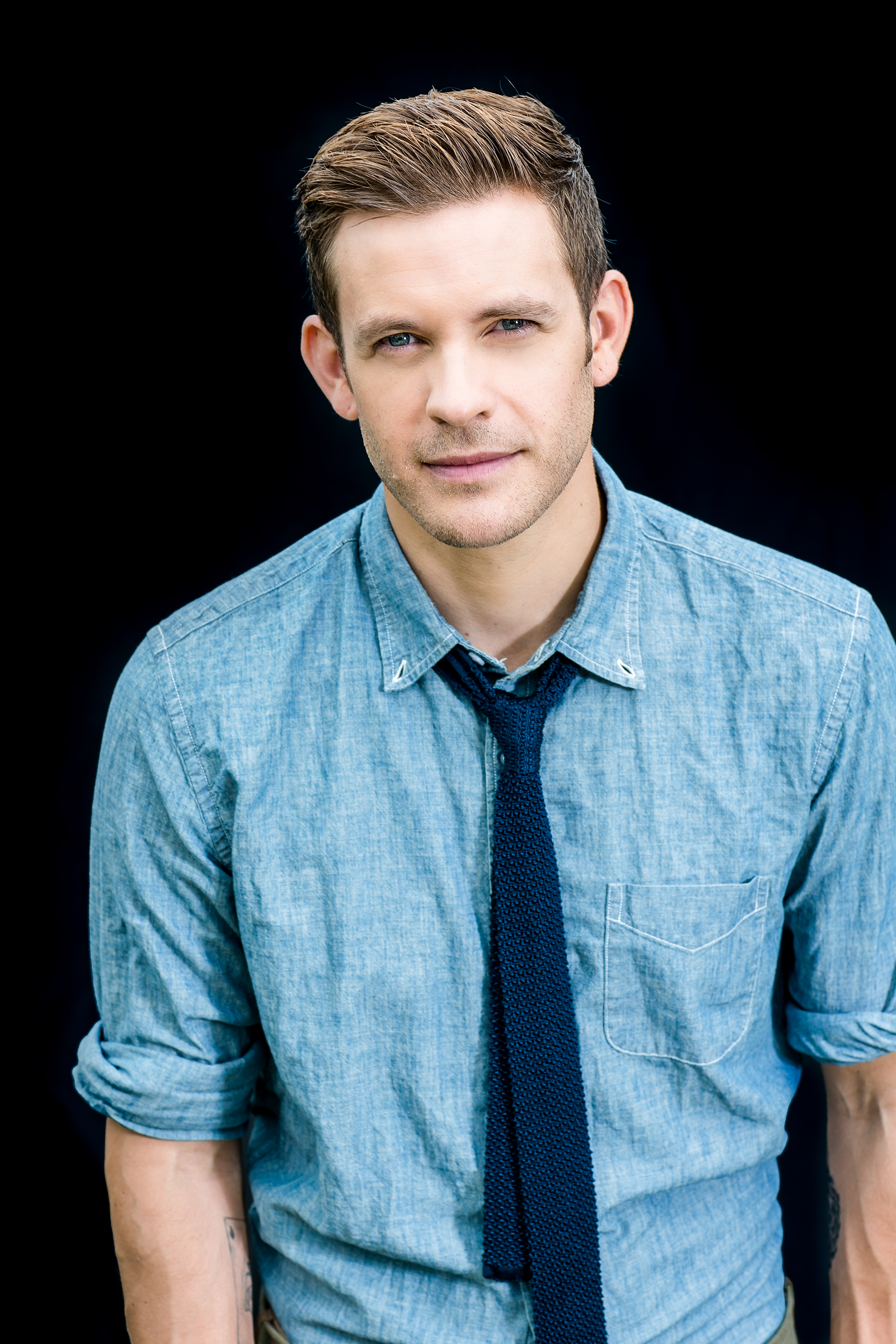
- Johnson in 2014
- Born: Bryce Owen Johnson; April 18, 1977 (age 49); Reno, Nevada, United States
- Occupation: Actor
- Years active: 1999–present
- Spouse: Dawn Joanne Shand (m. 2003)
- Website: brycejohnson.actor

Bryce Owen Johnson (born April 18, 1977) is an American actor.

== Early life ==
Johnson was born in Reno, Nevada. He has an older brother, Brendon, and a younger brother, Brett. He moved to Denver, Colorado, at the age of five. He graduated from high school in 1995. Afterwards, his family relocated to Sioux City, Iowa, where he attended acting lessons at college.

== Career ==
Johnson headed for Hollywood at 19 after his mother encouraged him not to join the Navy. While working odd-jobs to pay bills, he looked for auditions and enrolled at Pasadena's American Academy of Dramatic Arts. In 1999, he was cast as Josh Ford in The WB's Popular and Cliff in Undressed. After the show ended in 2001, Johnson continued on the platform of more teen-oriented projects with minor guest roles on Dawson's Creek, Gilmore Girls and other teenage shows.

By the time Johnson approached his mid-20s, he wanted to branch into more adult and challenging roles trying to stay clear of the teen genre. 2004 saw him playing a cheerleader in Bring It On Again and starring in two films screened at the Sundance Film Festival, Home of Phobia and Harry + Max. In 2003 he returned to television in an unaired series, Still Life, and made appearances on What I Like About You, Nip/Tuck, and House while doing voice-over work for video games. In 2006 he starred in a controversial film, Sleeping Dogs Lie, with Melinda Page Hamilton, which also screened at the Sundance Film Festival.

He is a series regular on Lone Star portraying Drew Thatcher, and also had a recurring role as Detective Darren Wilden on Pretty Little Liars. In 2011, Johnson starred in MTV's Death Valley as UTF police officer Billy Pierce. That same year, he played a supporting role as Chad in the dark romantic comedy Hit List. He guest-starred in the Glee episode "Previously Unaired Christmas" in December 2013, playing Cody Tolentino.

== Filmography ==
=== Film ===
Year	Title	Role	Notes
1999	Puzzled	Dominick	
2003	Chasing Papi	Bellboy	
2004	Bring It On Again	Greg	Direct-to-video
2004	Harry + Max	Harry	
2004	Home of Phobia	Tazwell	
2004	The Skulls III	Roger Lloyd	Direct-to-video
2006	Sleeping Dogs Lie	John	
2006	Becoming Bardo	Shucks	Short film
2007	Doctor Strange: The Sorcerer Supreme	Doctor Strange	Voice, direct-to-video
2008	Trucker	Rick	
2008	Man Maid	Bobby "Big Time" Billings	
2009	The Blue Tooth Virgin	David	
2008	Private Valentine: Blonde & Dangerous	Derek O'Grady	
2009	Hulk Vs	Bruce Banner	Voice, direct-to-video
2011	God Bless America	Co-worker	
2011	Hit List	Chad	
2013	Willow Creek	Jim	
2014	Something, Anything	Mark	
2014	Lucky Dog	Travis	
2014	Broadtrip	Cop	Short film
2014	Deadly Daycare	Daniel	
2015	Visions	Ben	
2015	Home Sweet Hell	Lanny Kelso	
2017	Darkness Rising	Jake	
2022	Allegoria	Marcus	
2023	Oppenheimer	AAF Officer	
2024	Terrifier 3	Greg	

=== Television ===
Year	Title	Role	Notes
1999	Undressed	Cliff	5 episodes
1999–2001	Popular	Josh Ford	Main cast; 43 episodes
2001	Gilmore Girls	Paul	Episode: "Run Away, Little Boy"
2001	Dawson's Creek	Library guy	Episode: "Four Scary Stories"
2005	What I Like About You	Chris	Episode: "Girls Gone Wild"
2005	House	James	Episode: "Acceptance"
2005	Nip/Tuck	Corporal Oliver Brandt	Episode: "Abby Mays"
2006	Standoff	Krista's boyfriend	Episode: "Pilot"
2006	Shark	Josh Carpenter	Episode: "In the Grasp"
2007	Without a Trace	Nick Edberg	Episode: "Desert Springs"
2007	Side Order of Life	Adam	Episode: "What Price Truth?"
2008	The Mentalist	Ranger Kyle	Episode: "Redwood"
2009	Drop Dead Diva	Eric Hayes	Episode: "Grayson's Anatomy"
2009	CSI: NY	Nick "Cool" Emerson	Episode: "Battle Scars"
2009	CSI: Crime Scene Investigation	Mark Baker	Episode: "Death and the Maiden"
2010, 2013	NCIS	Lieutenant David Shankton	Episode: "Mother's Day"
2010, 2013	NCIS	Eddie Macklin	Episode: "Devil's Triad"
2010–13, 2015–16	Pretty Little Liars	Detective Darren Wilden	23 episodes
2010	Lone Star	Drew Thatcher	Main cast; 2 episodes
2011	Death Valley	Officer Billy Pierce	Main cast; 12 episodes
2013	The Client List	Detective Dunbar	2 episodes
2013	Anger Management	Mike	Episode: "Charlie Dates Crazy, Sexy, Angry"
2013	Glee	Cody Tolentino	Episode: "Previously Unaired Christmas"
2014	Supernatural	Sal Lassiter	Episode: "Bloodlines"
2014	Hot in Cleveland	Dylan	Episode: "Naked and Afraid"
2015	Major Crimes	Chip Cochran	Episode: "Reality Check"
2016	Masters of Sex	Lee Dirks	Episode: "The Pleasure Protocol"
2016	Son of Zorn	Derek	Episode: "The War of the Workplace"
2016	Code Black	Rick	Episode: "Landslide"
2017	Doubt	Joseph Thomas Jr.	Episode: "Top Dog/Underdog"
2018	Bobcat Goldthwait's Misfits & Monsters	Caleb Faustini/Steve	Episode: "Devil in the Blue Jeans"
2018	The Good Doctor	Wade	Episode: "Carrots"
2021	Expedition Bigfoot	Himself	Discovery Channel
2021	Magnum P.I.	Andy Bates	Episode: "The Long Way Home"
2021	American Horror Story: Double Feature	Neil Armstrong	Episode: "Blue Moon"
2023	Yeti Massacre	Himself	Discovery Channel

=== Web ===
Year	Title	Role	Notes
2011–12	Simian Undercover Detective Squad	Various	5 episodes
2012	Dating Rules from My Future Self	Brendan Burke	6 episodes
2012	The Hi-Life	The customer	2 episodes

=== Video games ===
Year	Title	Voice role	Notes
2005	Call of Duty 2	—N/a	
2005	Call of Duty 2: Big Red One	—N/a	
2005	Gun	Port	
2006	Justice League Heroes	Aquaman	
2009	Transformers: Revenge of the Fallen	Protoform	
2012	Resistance: Burning Skies	Tom Riley	
2020	Wasteland 3	Opie	
2020	Maneater	Male Hunter	
