= The 11th Green =

- Directed by: Christopher Münch
- Written by: Christopher Münch
- Produced by: Christopher Münch; Valeria Lopez
- Starring: Campbell Scott
- Cinematography: Sara Garth
- Edited by: Curtiss Clayton; Nat Carter
- Music by: Mark Orton
- Production company: Antarctic Pictures
- Release date: January 10, 2020 (Palm Springs)
- Running time: 109 minutes
- Country: United States
- Language: English

The 11th Green is a 2020 American drama film written and directed by Christopher Münch and starring Campbell Scott.

== Cast ==
- Campbell Scott
- Agnes Bruckner
- George Gerdes
- Leith Burke
- Tom Stokes
- April Grace
- Mozell Hill
- Ian Hart
- Currie Graham
- David Clennon
- Monte Markham
- Kathryn Leigh Scott
- Shari Elf
- Clark Moorten

== Release ==
The film premiered at the Palm Springs International Film Festival on January 10, 2020. It was also released on June 26, 2020 at the Cinema Art Theater near Lewes, Delaware.

== Reception ==
The film holds a 75% approval rating on review aggregator website Rotten Tomatoes, based on 8 reviews, with a weighted average of 6.5/10. Richard Roeper of the Chicago Sun-Times awarded the film three stars out of four.

Sheri Linden of The Hollywood Reporter gave the film a positive review and called it "A thoughtful and compelling what-if, starring a never-better Campbell Scott."
