= James Joyce's The Dead =

Broadway musical based on short story by James Joyce

- Original Broadway Playbill
- Music: Shaun Davey
- Lyrics: Shaun Davey; Richard Nelson
- Book: Richard Nelson
- Basis: "The Dead" by James Joyce
- Productions: 1999 Off-Broadway; 2000 Broadway
- Awards: 2000 Tony Award for Best Book of a Musical

James Joyce's The Dead is a Broadway musical by Richard Nelson and Shaun Davey based upon James Joyce's short story "The Dead".

== Productions ==
The musical was originally presented Off-Broadway at Playwrights Horizons, starting on October 1, 1999. The opening night cast included Blair Brown, Paddy Croft, Brian Davies, Daisy Eagan, Dashiell Eaves, Sally Ann Howes, John Kelly, Brooke Sunny Moriber, Marni Nixon, Alice Ripley, Emily Skinner, Stephen Spinella and Christopher Walken. Musical direction was by Charles Prince, with music co-ordination and percussion by Tom Partington. It transferred to the Belasco Theatre on Broadway on January 11, 2000, where it completed a run of 120 performances before closing on April 16, 2000.

The musical ran at the Kennedy Center (Washington, D.C.), from October 14, 2000 to November 12, 2000, with Faith Prince and Stephen Bogardus as Greta and Gabriel Conroy and Brandon Wardell . The musical had played an earlier engagement at the Ahmanson Theatre in Los Angeles from July 11, 2000 to September 3, 2000.

== Songs ==
Source
playbillvault

- Killarney's Lakes – Mary Jane Morkan, Aunt Kate Morkan and Rita
- Kate Kearney – Michael, Mary Jane Morkan and Company
- Parnell's Plight – Miss Molly Ivors, Michael, Gabriel Conroy, Gretta Conroy and Company
- Adieu to Ballyshannon – Gabriel Conroy and Gretta Conroy
- When Lovely Lady – Aunt Julia Morkan and Aunt Kate Morkan
- Three Jolly Pigeons – Freddy Malins, Mr. Browne and Company
- Goldenhair – Gretta Conroy and Gabriel Conroy
- Three Graces – Gabriel Conroy and Company
- Naughty Girls – Aunt Julia Morkan, Aunt Kate Morkan, Mary Jane Morkan and Company
- Wake the Dead – Freddy Malins and Company
- D'Arcy's Aria – Bartell D'Arcy
- Queen of Our Hearts – Mr. Browne, Freddy Malins, Gabriel Conroy, Bartell D'Arcy and Michael
- When Lovely Lady (Reprise) – Young Julia Morkan and Aunt Julia Morkan
- Michael Furey – Gretta Conroy
- The Living and the Dead – Gabriel Conroy and Company

== Awards and nominations ==
=== Original Broadway production ===
Year	Award Ceremony	Category	Nominee	Result
2000	Tony Award	Best Musical		Nominated
2000	Tony Award	Best Book of a Musical	Richard Nelson	Won
2000	Tony Award	Best Original Score	Shaun Davey and Richard Nelson	Nominated
2000	Tony Award	Best Performance by a Leading Actor in a Musical	Christopher Walken	Nominated
2000	Tony Award	Best Performance by a Featured Actor in a Musical	Stephen Spinella	Nominated
2000	Drama Desk Award	Outstanding Musical		Nominated
2000	Drama Desk Award	Outstanding Featured Actor in a Musical	Stephen Spinella	Won
2000	Drama Desk Award	Outstanding Featured Actress in a Musical	Sally Ann Howes	Nominated
2000	Drama Desk Award	Outstanding Music	Shaun Davey	Nominated
2000	New York Drama Critics' Circle Award	Best Musical	Shaun Davey and Richard Nelson	Won
