= Letters from the Big Man =

- Directed by: Christopher Münch
- Written by: Christopher Münch
- Produced by: Christopher Münch
- Starring: Lily Rabe; Jason Butler Harner; Isaac C. Singleton Jr.
- Cinematography: Rob Sweeney
- Edited by: Curtiss Clayton; Christopher Münch
- Music by: Ensemble Galilei; Steven Gates
- Production company: Antarctic Pictures
- Release date: January 23, 2011 (Sundance)
- Running time: 104 minutes
- Country: United States
- Language: English

Letters from the Big Man is a 2011 American science fiction drama film written and directed by Christopher Münch and starring Lily Rabe, Jason Butler Harner and Isaac C. Singleton Jr.

== Cast ==
- Lily Rabe
- Jason Butler Harner
- Isaac C. Singleton Jr.
- Jim Cody Williams
- Fiona Dourif
- Don McManus
- Karen Black

== Reception ==
The film has an 86% rating on Rotten Tomatoes. Roger Ebert awarded the film three stars.

Dennis Harvey of Variety gave the film a negative review, describing it as "distinctive, frustrating and somewhat bewildering."
