= Tom E. Brown =

American film producer

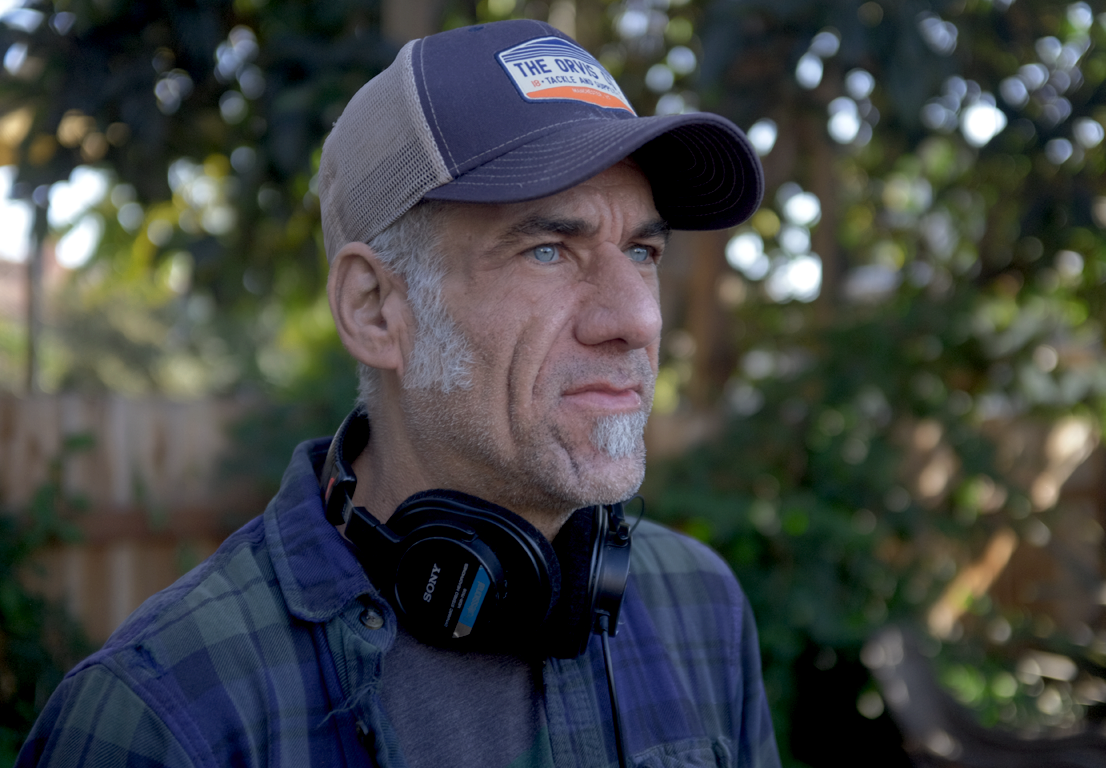
- Born: March 2, 1967 (age 58); Stamford, CT
- Occupation(s): Director, screenwriter, producer, actor

Tom E. Brown (born March 2, 1967) is an American director, screenwriter, producer, and actor.

== Career ==
Brown’s short film Don’t Run, Johnny was acquired by IFC after its screening at the Sundance Film Festival in 1998. IFC also acquired his next two short films, Rubber Gloves (Golden Spire winner) and Das Clown (Sundance 2000). In addition to hundreds of festival screenings, Brown’s films have been featured at the American Museum of Natural History, the Walker Art Center and The Guggenheim.

Brown’s feature debut, Pushing Dead, was a Sundance Institute/Rockefeller Foundation-supported feature starring James Roday, Robin Weigert, and Danny Glover. Pushing Dead screened at over 50 film festivals, garnering awards for all three main actors and 10 best-feature audience and jury awards. Pushing Dead was released in North America in 2018.
