= Harry + Max =

Harry and Max
- Directed by: Christopher Münch
- Written by: Christopher Münch
- Produced by: Roni Deitz; Christopher Münch
- Starring: Bryce Johnson; Cole Williams
- Cinematography: Rob Sweeney
- Edited by: Annette Davey; Christopher Münch
- Music by: Michael Tubbs
- Distributed by: TLA Releasing
- Release dates: January 17, 2004 (Sundance); February 18, 2005 (U.S.)
- Running time: 74 minutes
- Country: United States
- Language: English

Harry and Max (alternative title Harry + Max), is a 2004 American drama film directed by Christopher Münch and starring Bryce Johnson and Cole Williams.

== Plot ==
The film centers around teen idol brothers, Harry (Johnson), and Max (Williams). Harry is at the end of his career while Max is just starting his. Harry is heterosexual, whereas Max is gay and, despite his youth, has come to terms with his sexuality.

During a camping trip, matters get further complicated by a partial resumption of an incestuous affair between the brothers. The fallout from this further muddles both their lives, as they attempt to understand their feelings for each other and to protect each other in a world in which everybody, including their own mother, seems to want to take advantage of them.

== Cast ==
- Bryce Johnson as Harry
- Cole Williams as Max
- Rain Phoenix as Nikki
- Katherine Ellis as Brandi
- Roni Deitz as Roxanne
- Tom Gilroy as Josiah
- Michelle Phillips as Mother
- Justin Zachary as Jordan
- Max Piscioneri as Max, Aged 9
- Mark L. Young as Harry, Aged 15

== Awards ==
Harry and Max was nominated for the Grand Jury Prize at the 2004 Sundance Film Festival.
