= Goodnight Children Everywhere =

- Cover of Faber & Faber edition, 1997
- Written by: Richard Nelson
- Subject: Lives changed by the evacuations of civilians in Britain during World War II
- Genre: Drama
- Setting: London, Spring 1945

Premiere
- Date premiered: December 11, 1997
- Place premiered: The Other Place; Stratford, England

Goodnight Children Everywhere is a 1997 play written by American playwright Richard Nelson that premiered at The Other Place, in Stratford-upon-Avon, England. The play is set in 1945 just after the end of World War II. Three sisters reunite with their brother who had been sent to live in the United States during the period of evacuations of civilians during the London bombings.

== Production history ==
Goodnight Children Everywhere, produced by the Royal Shakespeare Company, opened at The Other Place on December 11, 1997, played at Newcastle-upon-Tyne (September 1998) and Plymouth (November 1998) and the Pit at the Barbican Theatre in London in February 1999.

The play premiered in the United States in a Playwrights Horizons production at the off-Broadway Wilder Theater, opening in previews on May 7, 1999, officially on May 26, 1999, and closing June 20, 1999 after 29 performances. Directed by Nelson, the cast featured Robin Weigert, Kali Rocha, Heather Goldenhersh, Jon DeVries, Chris Stafford, John Rothman and Amy Whitehouse.

The West Coast premiere was in an American Conservatory Theater, San Francisco production in February - March 2001, again directed by Nelson.

== Awards and nominations ==
Awards

- 2000 Laurence Olivier Award for Best New Play
