= Something, Anything =

- Film poster
- Directed by: Paul Harrill
- Written by: Paul Harrill
- Produced by: Ashley Maynor
- Starring: Ashley Shelton; Bryce Johnson; Linds Edwards
- Cinematography: Kunitaro Ohi
- Edited by: Jennifer Lilly
- Music by: Eric V. Hachikian
- Production companies: Nest Features; Self-Reliant Film
- Release dates: April 5, 2014 (Wisconsin Film Festival); January 9, 2015 (New York City)
- Running time: 88 minutes
- Country: United States
- Language: English

Something, Anything is a 2014 American independent film written and directed by Paul Harrill. The film was produced by Ashley Maynor, and stars Ashley Shelton, Bryce Johnson, and Linds Edwards.

== Plot ==
Peggy is a seemingly typical Southern newlywed, who gradually transforms into a spiritual seeker, quietly threatening the closest relationships around her.

== Production ==
The film was primarily shot in Knoxville, Tennessee, with additional filming in Lexington, Kentucky, and at the Abbey of Our Lady of Gethsemani near Bardstown, Kentucky.

Something, Anything had its "co-world premiere" at the Wisconsin Film Festival and the Sarasota Film Festival with the first screening April 5, 2014 at the Wisconsin Film Festival. Later festival screenings included the Edinburgh International Film Festival, BAMcinemaFest, Austin Film Festival, and Nashville Film Festival.

After premiering at festivals in 2014, the film was one of the first films selected by the Independent Filmmaker Project to have a one-week run in New York City via IFP's Screen Forward platform. The film ran in New York City January 9–15, 2015.

== Reception ==
Upon its release in January 2015, Something, Anything was named a "Critics' Pick" by Jeannette Catsoulis of The New York Times and Zachary Wigon of The Village Voice. Michal Oleszczyk, writing for RogerEbert.com, gave the film three and a half stars (out of four) and called it a work of "theological humility and simple, unforgettable beauty." The Dissolve's Matthew Dessem called it "remarkable" and gave it the site's first "Essential Viewing" tag of 2015. Justin Chang in his Variety review called the film a "quietly assured writing-directing debut." Joshua Rothkopf of Time Out, meanwhile, dissented, giving the film two stars (out of five).

On review aggregation website Rotten Tomatoes the film has a 92% rating from 13 reviews.
