= Russell Brown (director) =

American filmmaker

Russell Brown is a filmmaker from Los Angeles, California. He is known for writing and directing the films Loren & Rose (2021), The 44 Scarves of Liza Minnelli (2019), Search Engines (2016), Annie and the Gypsy (2012), The Blue Tooth Virgin (2008), and Race You to the Bottom (2005). Brown has also directed a number of documentaries and short films.

== Education and career ==
Brown attended the University of Southern California (USC) film program where he graduated Phi Beta Kappa in 1997 with a BA in Critical Studies. While at USC, Brown interned at Mandalay Entertainment Group. He has served as a creative executive at Columbia Pictures with Laura Ziskin Productions and at Paramount Pictures with Saturday Night Live Studios.

== Filmography ==
Year	Film	Director	Producer	Writer	Notes
2003	Mama Laura's Boys	Yes	Yes	No	Short
2004	Reality USA	Yes	Yes	No	Short
2005	Race You to the Bottom	Yes	Yes	Yes	Short
2008	The Blue Tooth Virgin	Yes	Yes	Yes	
2009	Lorca's Nights	Yes	Yes	No	Short
2011	Everyone Who Hears This Story Gets Laid	Yes	Yes	No	Short
2012	Annie and the Gypsy	Yes	Yes	Yes	
2014	Karen Black: On Acting	Yes	Yes	Yes	
2014	Conversation with a Cigarette	Yes	Yes	Yes	Short
2016	Search Engines	Yes	Yes	Yes	
2018	The Kaleidoscope Guy at the Market	Yes	No	No	Short
2019	The 44 Scarves of Liza Minnelli	Yes	Yes	No	Short
2019	Above the Arroyo: A Dream of the Stairs of Los Angeles	Yes	No	No	
2019	The 100 Umbrellas of Erik Satie	Yes	Yes	Yes	Short
2020	Friends of Residential Treasures: LA - FORT Films	Yes	Yes	Yes	Show, 7 episodes
2021	Loren & Rose	Yes	Yes	Yes	In production
