= Ariel Aparicio =

American singer

- Genre: Pop/Rock
- Instruments: vocals, guitar
- Website: http://www.arielaparicio.com/

Ariel Aparicio is a Cuban–American pop-rock singer, songwriter, and guitarist based in Brooklyn, New York City. He has released three full-length albums.

== Biography ==
=== Early life ===
Ariel Aparicio was born in Cuba and raised in Miami. He studied music at New York University and now lives in Sarasota, Fl.

=== Career ===
Aparicio is a singer-songwriter who plays acoustic and electric guitar. He has released three full-length albums and a cover of The Psychedelic Furs classic Pretty in Pink. Richard Butler (lead singer for The Furs) said of the cover, "I love it. Well done." He supported the Greater New York chapter of the Susan G. Komen breast cancer foundation with proceeds from Pretty in Pink for the month of April 2009. "Pretty in Pink" was also revamped into a dance music single. He is working with producer Tom Gilroy and guitarist Steve Dawson on his fourth album of rock and dance music with Spanish vocals.

==== Music videos ====
Several of Aparicio's music videos have been played on Viacom's LOGO channel. His video for Life and Times held the No. 1 spot on LOGO's most requested video show The Click List for three weeks. His video for The New World premiered on the NewNowNext program. His video for Pretty in Pink also premiered on NewNowNext and spent eighteen weeks on The Click List's Top 10, ending the year as the No. 3 most requested video for 2009.

== Discography ==
All I Wanted

1. "Hail To The Loser"
2. "Angel"
3. "Neverland (The Lollypop Song)"
4. "All I Wanted"
5. "Kid"
6. "Dreamer" special guest performance by Tracy Bonham
7. "Mi Corazon"
8. "Always The Bridesmaid"
9. "The Wild Ones"
10. "Sweetness"
11. "Calling All Cars"

Frolit & F***

1. "Punk Rock Girl"
2. "All My Life"
3. "Blue"
4. "Get Happy"
5. "The Pill"
6. "Brenda Lee"
7. "Unsatisfied"

All These Brilliant Things (fall 2008)

1. "Intro"
2. "Life and Times"
3. "Heaven"
4. "The New World"
5. "I'm The One"
6. "Marching Like Fools"
7. "Bones"
8. "Jameson & Cocaine"
9. "Down In Tijuana"
10. "Hang Around"
11. "Mr. High & Mighty"
12. "Shayla"
