= Freeway Killer (film) =

- Film poster
- Directed by: John Murlowski
- Screenplay by: David Birke
- Produced by: Nadine Corde; Larry Rattner; Tim Swain
- Starring: Scott Anthony Leet; Cole Williams; Dusty Sorg; Debbon Ayer; Eileen Dietz; Michael Rooker
- Cinematography: John Murlowski
- Edited by: Joy Zimmerman
- Music by: Erik Godal
- Production companies: Fresh Planet; Compound B
- Distributed by: Image Entertainment
- Release date: 16 February 2010 (United States)
- Running time: 88 minutes
- Country: United States
- Language: English

Freeway Killer is a 2010 crime horror thriller film directed by John Murlowski and written by David Birke. A direct-to-video release, it is based on the crimes of William Bonin, an American serial killer who raped, tortured, and murdered at least twenty-one men and boys in Southern California in 1979 and 1980. It stars Scott Anthony Leet as Bonin, and co-stars Cole Williams, Dusty Sorg, Debbon Ayer, Eileen Dietz, and Michael Rooker.

== Plot ==
William Bonin is a Vietnam veteran who works as a delivery driver in Southern California. Bonin, when not preoccupied with his job or his ailing mother, tortures and kills young men with the aid of an occultist named Vernon Butts. The two committed a string of murders in Orange County before relocating to Los Angeles.

By 1980, Bonin and Vern's relationship has become strained, so Bonin begins grooming a new accomplice, an insecure youth named Kyle Peterson. Bonin shows Kyle pictures of his and Vern's victims before coercing him into helping him murder a boy who was hitchhiking to Disneyland. Kyle is enthralled by Bonin's survival of the fittest philosophy and stories about the Vietnam War, and, under his tutelage, becomes more confident and assertive, being promoted to manager at his job, and rekindling his relationship with his girlfriend, Lisa. Vern becomes envious of Bonin's relationship with Kyle, and, during an argument, claims that Bonin never saw combat in Vietnam, and instead spent all of his time overseas "sticking his pistol to a couple of buck privates, making them suck his dick." Kyle convinces Bonin to kill Vern, but Bonin is unable to go through with it, and instead tends to Vern's wound after Vern slits his own wrist in front of him and Kyle.

Bonin, feeling alienated from both Kyle and Vern, forces another a youth named Billy Pugh to help him kill a boy named Alex. Billy is sickened by the murder and runs away, panicking Bonin. Kyle and Vern will not answer any of Bonin's calls, and when Bonin confronts Kyle in-person and tries to convince him to commit a "Freeway Killer" copycat crime to mislead investigators, Kyle refuses, telling Bonin, "It's over." Even though the authorities are closing in on him, Bonin tries to commit another murder, and is caught in the act by a police taskforce led by Detective St. John. Vern hangs himself in prison after he, Kyle, and Billy are turned in by Bonin, who is sentenced to death after he refuses to allow his legal counsel to admit potentially mitigating evidence, like psychiatric reports and files pertaining to his turbulent family history and upbringing, due to not wanting to subject his mother to the burden of taking the stand and having the media label her a "freakshow."

While on death row, Bonin confesses to further murders in exchange for privileges like fast food, and eventually makes the acquaintance of Ruth Slobod, a grieving mother who believes that her son was murdered by Bonin. Bonin is not sure if he killed Ruth's son, but he spends years stringing her along anyway, to alleviate his boredom and loneliness, and to manipulate her into helping him try and get a commutation of his sentence from the Governor of California. When Ruth becomes sick of Bonin's games and vows to be present for his execution so that she can watch him die, Bonin mockingly advises her to "watch the eyes" because "that's where it all happens."

The film ends with Bonin being executed via lethal injection in 1996, and with an intertitle stating that his unclaimed remains were cremated and scattered over the Pacific Ocean.

== Cast ==
- Scott Anthony Leet as William Bonin
- Cole Williams as Kyle Peterson
- Dusty Sorg as Vernon Butts
- Michael Rooker as Detective St. John
- Debbon Ayer as Ruth Slobod
- Thomas Curtis as William Jennings Pugh, Jr.
- Mercy Malick as Lisa
- Nik Tyler as Steven
- Eileen Dietz as Mrs. Bonin
- Tom DeTrinis as Brian Slobod
- Tyler Neitzel as Alex
- James Babson as William Pugh, Sr.
- Doug Haley as Sean

== Release ==
Freeway Killer was released on DVD and Blu-ray by Image Entertainment on February 16, 2010. The film's special features include an audio commentary with director John Murlowski and writer David Birke, and a making-of featurette titled Freeway Killer: Captured.

== Reception ==
Michael Allen of 28 Days Later Analysis gave Freeway Killer a score of 7/10, and while critical of how little it delved into Bonin's background and certain aspects of his crimes, otherwise praised it, writing, "Balancing itself nicely on the catwalk between being an entertainment piece and being simply informative the film leaves the darkest parts of Bonin's unresolved sexual conflicts out of the show in order to respect the viewers' sensitivities. An enjoyable watch from beginning to end, viewers need to pay attention to future performances from Scott Leet." David Van Der Haeghen of DVD Town also praised Scott Anthony Leet's performance, calling it "strong, lifelike and memorable" and further opining, "His demeanor and timing throughout the short 88-minute run time are on point, and if this weren't a smaller release, he might have hit more radar screens for awards consideration."

While Ruud Stift of Cinemagazine enjoyed the film, he also felt that it was "a bit too superficial" and "clearly no Se7en" before giving it a final score of 2.5/5. In a review written for Rue Morgue, John W. Bowen commended Leet's acting, which they felt elevated what was otherwise a "fair-to-middlin' effort" that was marred by aspects like obvious budgetary constraints and a "curious squeamishness over addressing Bonin's homosexuality." Casey Broadwater of Blu-ray.com condemned Freeway Killer, giving it a score of 1.5/5 and bluntly stating, "The film tries desperately to get inside the mind of a murderer, but it's constantly thwarted by budgetary constraints, a stilted script, and awkward, hammy performances."
