= Radical Technologies =

2017 non-fiction book by Adam Greenfield

- First edition
- Author: Adam Greenfield
- Language: English
- Genre: Non-fiction, journalism
- Publisher: Verso Books (UK), Verso (U.S.)
- Publication date: June 2017
- Publication place: UK
- ISBN: 978-1-78478-043-2 (hardcover)

Radical Technologies is a non-fiction book by the UK-based American author Adam Greenfield. Subtitled 'The design of everyday life' it looks at the technologies that are transforming the world at an ever increasing rate.

Greenfield's take on the influence of technologies such as blockchain and digital fabrication is generally speaking a pessimistic one. He is concerned about the atomisation of society as experience becomes individualised, and about how we are unwittingly handing over vast amounts of power to faceless corporations with very little debate from politicians and other leaders about what we actually want from technology.

In the opening chapter on smartphones for example, whilst marvelling that the entire cartographic knowledge of the world and even our place in it is now available to us on a flat screen that we can hold in our hands, we are for the most part blissfully unaware of all of the interconnected technologies - the NAVSTAR satellite GPS systems, the vast data centres that process the information, the networking and wireless infrastructure that transmit the signals - that allow this functionality to exist. More importantly, Greenfield notes, so quickly has using a smartphone map ceased to be a wonder and become just part of every day live that "we have become reliant on the network to accomplish our ordinary goals".

In the chapter on artificial intelligence (subtitled 'The eclipse of human discretion') Greenfield notes that machines can now do things that were until recently thought to be a uniquely human preserve, such as winning the strategy game Go or creating a highly plausible painting in the style of Rembrandt. In these and other areas where people had the edge, machines can now outperform human beings. AI learns fast and it will not be long before "autonomous algorithmic systems acquire an effectively human level of cognitive ability". What's more, he says, it is difficult to see how this eventuality can be prevented.

The societal effects of automation also come under scrutiny. The most commonly held job in 29 of the 50 US states is truck driver. This will also be one of the first jobs to be automated out of existence. What will happen to the truck drivers then, the author asks.

The book concludes with four possible scenarios that might play out as automation plays an increasing role in the mediation of every aspect of life.

== Chapters ==
- Smartphone: The networking of the self
- The internet of things: A planetary mesh of perception and response
- Augmented reality: An interactive overlay on the world
- Digital fabrication: Towards a political economy
- Cryptocurrency: The computational guarantee of value
- Blockchain beyond Bitcoin: A trellis for post-human institutions
- Automation: The annihilation of work
- Machine learning: The algorithmic production of knowledge
- Artificial intelligence: The eclipse of human discretion
- Radical technologies: The design of everyday life

== Critical reception ==
Radical technologies received positive reviews. The Guardian described it as “A tremendously intelligent and stylish book on the ‘colonization of everyday life by information processing'”, while Jennifer Howard in The Times Literary Supplement said it “provides a grounded guide, a cautionary tale in which each chapter walks readers through another layer of a dazzling and treacherous landscape”. Brian Eno described as it an “essential book”.
