= Cole Williams =

American actor

Cole Williams is an American film and TV actor. He has films including North Country, and Harry + Max (playing a gay teen idol). He also had a recurring role as Anthony W. on 8 Simple Rules.

Williams was born in Los Angeles County, California, the son of singer-songwriter Paul Williams and Kate (née Clinton) Williams, and brother to Sarah Caitlin Rose Williams.

== Biography ==
Williams attended Proctor Academy in New Hampshire and was accepted into SUNY Purchase College. His debut in the film industry was in the film Urban Chaos Theory. This opportunity catapulted him to roles in Harry + Max, Race You to the Bottom, North Country, Lovers, Liars & Lunatics, Spaced Out and Freeway Killer. He has also landed TV roles and appearances in Scrubs, Drake & Josh, and Zoey 101, but is well known for his role as Anthony in the television series 8 Simple Rules... For Dating My Teenage Daughter.

== Filmography ==
=== Film ===
Year	Film	Role	Notes
2000	Urban Chaos Theory	The Brother	
2002	L.T.R	Michael	
2003	Die Mexico Connection	Hunt Carter	
2003	Boys Life 4: Four Play	Michael	
2004	Harry + Max	Max	
2005	Race You to the Bottom	Nathan	
2005	North Country	Young Bobby	
2006	Lovers, Liars and Lunatics	Gunner	
2006	Gypsies, Tramps & Thieves	Mark	
2009	Spaced Out	Herb Stone	
2010	Freeway Killer	Kyle Peterson	

=== Television ===
Year	Film	Role	Notes
2002	Scrubs	Mike	1 Episode: "My First Step"
2002–2003	8 Simple Rules	Anthony W.	5 episodes
2004	Hollywood Division	Teen	Television film
2004	Drake & Josh	Drummer	1 episode: "Blues Brothers"
2005	Zoey 101	Drummer	1 episode: "Spring Fling"
2006	Cold Case	Justin Bradley	1 episode: "One Night"
2006	Mammoth	Squirelly	Television film
2007	Veronica Mars	Derrick Carr	1 episode: "Un-American Graffiti"
2007–2009	Entourage	Five Town's Castmate	4 episodes
2008	CSI: NY	Bryce Aldecott	1 episode: "Happily Never After"
2008	Heroes	Ryan Hanover	1 episode: "Chapter Twelves 'Our Father'"
2008	Heroes: The Recruit	Ryan Hanover	2 episodes
2010	Ghost Whisperer	Colin	1 episode: "Thin On Ice"
2010	The Amanda Show	Guy from the Audience who needs help with Karate	
