= Color of a Brisk and Leaping Day =

- DVD cover
- Directed by: Christopher Münch
- Written by: Christopher Münch; Caveh Zahedi (script consultant and additional dialogue)
- Produced by: Andrea Sperling
- Starring: Peter Alexander; Henry Gibson; Michael Stipe
- Cinematography: Rob Sweeney
- Edited by: Christopher Münch
- Distributed by: Artistic License
- Release dates: January 1996 (Sundance); March 23, 1996 (U.S.)
- Running time: 87 minutes
- Country: United States
- Language: English

Color of a Brisk and Leaping Day is a 1996 drama film written and directed by Christopher Münch about a Chinese-American's attempt at saving the Yosemite Valley Railroad in post-WWII California. It stars Peter Alexander and features R.E.M. singer Michael Stipe in a supporting role. The title comes from a poem by Octavio Paz.

== Cast ==
- Jeri Arredondo as Nancy
- Henry Gibson as Albert Robinson
- Michael Stipe as Skeeter
- Diana Larkin as Wendy
- Alexandra Bokyun Chun as Angela
- John Diehl as Pinchot
- Peter Alexander as John Lee
- Joan Newmark as Mrs. Hopper

== Reception ==
Rotten Tomatoes has given the film a 20% rating from 5 critics. In a mixed review for the New York Times, Janet Maslin wrote "Part allegory and part photo essay, the film has a poetic beauty that rises above its brooding reticence. But too much of it lingers ineffectually over thoughts not quite spoken and deeds left undone." She praised the film's cinematography, saying "Whether capturing the natural beauty of clouds and wilderness or the grand old trains that summon a vivid American past, the film's look is extraordinarily eloquent and pure."

The Baltimore Sun gave the film a very positive review, which said "Munch has taken a kernel of a true story and made of it a richly contemplative work. It is a celebration of cinema and of railroads, which when joined, have a unique and romantic capacity for transporting us to a different time and place." Comparing the cinematography to photos of Yosemite by Ansel Adams, reviewer Kevin Thomas concluded that the film is a "wedding of dreams and technology" and "a beguiling, unique reverie."

== Awards ==
At the 1996 Sundance Film Festival, Rob Sweeney won the Cinematography Award and Christopher Münch was nominated for the Grand Jury Award. It also won Munch the Someone to Watch Award at the 11th Independent Spirit Awards.
