= Madame Melville =

Play written by Richard Nelson

Madame Melville is a play by Richard Nelson. It is set in Paris in 1966 and is about an American student, Carl, who finds himself alone in the flat of Claudie, one of his teachers. They find there is much to discover - about art, life, love, each other and themselves.

When produced in London from 10. October 2000 at the Vaudeville Theatre, it marked the return of Macaulay Culkin to acting after a six-year hiatus. It also starred Irene Jacob as Claudie and Madeleine Potter as Ruth.

== Sources ==
- Richard Nelson: Madame Melville. FF Plays, London 2000, 80 Pages, ISBN 978-0-5712-0794-7
- Vaudeville Theatre: Madame Melville (Programme Booklet Winter 2000)
