= Richard Nelson (playwright) =

American dramatist

- Born: Richard John Nelson; October 17, 1950 (age 76); Chicago, Illinois
- Spouse: Cynthia Blair Bacon (m. 1972)
- Children: 2
- Writing career
- Notable works: Chess (1988); James Joyce's The Dead (1999); Hyde Park on Hudson (2012)
- Notable awards: Obie Award, Rockefeller Playwright-in-Residence Award, Giles Cooper Award, Tony Award, Olivier Award, Drama Desk Award, PEN/Laura Pels Award

Richard John Nelson (born October 17, 1950) is an American playwright and librettist. He wrote the book for the 2000 Broadway musical James Joyce's The Dead, for which he won the Tony Award for Best Book of a Musical, as well as the book for the 1988 Broadway production of Chess. He is also the writer of the critically acclaimed play cycle The Rhinebeck Panorama.

== Early life ==
Nelson was born in Chicago, Illinois to Viola, a dancer, and Richard Finis Nelson, an accounting-systems analyst and some times sales representative. During Nelson's childhood, the family moved frequently to accommodate his father's work, but they settled for long stretches in Gary, Indiana, the outskirts of Philadelphia, and finally in a suburb of Detroit. Nelson's earliest theatrical influences were in musical theatre, and he estimates that he saw more than twenty-five musicals before ever seeing his first straight play.

He graduated from Hamilton College in 1972, and received an honorary Doctor of Literature degree from Hamilton College in 2004.

== Career ==
He has worked with the Royal Shakespeare Company, and had ten plays produced there. Those plays include: Principia Scriptoriae (1986), Some Americans Abroad (1989), Two Shakespearean Actors (1990), Columbus and the Discovery of Japan (1992), Misha's Party (1993), New England (1994),The General From America (1996) and Goodnight Children Everywhere (1997).

In November 2006, Frank's Home, about two days in the life of Frank Lloyd Wright, premiered in Chicago, Nelson's home town, at the Goodman Theatre (in association with Playwrights Horizons). In an interview in The Brooklyn Rail at the time of its New York debut, Nelson offers advice to young writers: "My advice is always to write, to write what really matters. I ask my students two questions: Why did you write it? And should I watch it? People ask about structure, form, character development, and I’m not even sure what all of that means. Try not to second guess yourself. Form will come if you focus on what you want to say with truth and honesty. Structure is the hand that holds up what you want to say." From 2005 to 2008, Nelson was the chair of the playwriting department at the Yale School of Drama.

== The Apple Family plays ==
From 2010 to 2013, Nelson wrote and directed four plays centered around the Apple Family, a fictional household set in Rhinebeck, New York with each play focused on either an election or a significant historical anniversary. The main characters are three adult sisters, Barbara, Marian and Jane – called a "Chekhovian family pod" by the Variety reviewer.

The first play in the series, That Hopey Changey Thing, focused on the 2010 midterm elections and opened on election night, November 2, 2010. The second play, Sweet and Sad (2011), depicts the family on the tenth anniversary of the September 11 attacks. The third play, Sorry, opened on November 6, 2012, and takes place during the 2012 presidential election. The final play, Regular Singing (2013), is set on the 50th anniversary of the JFK assassination. Each play debuted off-Broadway at The Public Theater, featuring essentially the same cast members in each subsequent production. With the opening of Regular Singing in 2013, the Public Theater presented the entire series in repertory.

The cast of That Hopey Changey Thing, Sweet and Sad, and Sorry featured Jon DeVries as Benjamin Apple, Maryann Plunkett as Barbara Apple, Jay O. Sanders as Richard Apple, Shuler Hensley as Tim Andrews, Laila Robins as Marian Apple Platt and J. Smith-Cameron as Jane Apple Halls. The cast of Regular Singing included the first three casts with the exceptions of Steven Kunken as Tim Andrews and Sally Murphy as Jane Apple Halls.

On April 29, 2020, the Public live-streamed a new Apple Family play, What Do We Need to Talk About?. Again directed by Nelson, it reunited the cast from Regular Singing. The characters, now seven years older, meet by video during the COVID-19 pandemic.

On October 25, 2026, the new play We'll See featuring the Apple Family premiered at The Public Theater. This marked the family's first appearance onstage in over a deade, and features the family watching the results of the 2026 midterm elections.

== The Gabriels ==
Nelson wrote an additional trilogy, titled The Gabriels: Election Year in the Life of One Family, focusing on the Gabriel family during the 2016 presidential election year. The same cast appears in all three plays: Meg Gibson (Karin Gabriel), Lynn Hawley (Hannah Gabriel), Roberta Maxwell (Patricia Gabriel), Maryann Plunkett (Mary Gabriel), Jay O. Sanders (George Gabriel), and Amy Warren (Joyce Gabriel). The first play, Hungry, opened off-Broadway at the Public Theatre on February 27, 2016 (previews), and officially on March 4, directed by Nelson. The next play in the trilogy, What Did You Expect?, opened on September 10, 2016, in previews, officially on September 16 and closed on October 9. The final play, Women of a Certain Age, opened on election night, November 8, 2016. and ran to December 4. The three plays ran in repertory December 10 to 18.

Hungry is set in Dutchess County, New York. The family of the recently deceased Thomas Gabriel are in the kitchen to prepare dinner. The group includes Thomas's widow, Mary; his sister, Joyce; his brother George and his wife Hannah; his elderly mother Patricia; and his first wife Karin. For dinner, the group peels apples for apple crisp and makes ratatouille and pasta. Referring to the political campaign, one character says: "God, it's going to be a long eight months." What Did You Expect?, also set in Rhinebeck, takes place six months after Hungry. Patricia has taken a roommate at her retirement community, and her debts are the focus of the play. The family prepares for a picnic as they deal with their "fears of the post-recession world." In Women of a Certain Age, set between 5 pm and 7 pm on election night, the Gabriels have gathered for dinner. George has picked up their son from college to vote and has driven him back. Joyce is at home and Patricia has also joined the group. The play ends without revealing the winner of the election. Ben Brantley wrote: "Far more than in any of his other plays, Mr. Nelson comes close here to capturing the elusive, expansive comic sadness we associate with his beloved Chekhov. That Chekhovian sense of time fading even as we inhabit it thrums through both the talk and the silences."

The Gabriels played an engagement at the Kennedy Center (Washington, DC) in January 2017 and then played at The Perth International Arts Festival (Australia) on February 11–18, and the Hong Kong Arts Festival on February 22–26. The original cast performed.

== The Michaels ==
In 2019 Nelson added to the Rhinebeck Panorama with The Michaels, which ran at the Public October 19 – December 1, 2019. As with the Apple and Gabriel family plays it takes place around a meal, this time in the kitchen of Rose Michael, a celebrated choreographer.

Nelson directed a cast made up of Charlotte Bydwell as Lucy Michael, Haviland Morris as Irenie Walker, Maryann Plunkett as Kate Harris, Matilda Sakamoto as May Smith, Jay O. Sanders as David Michael, Brenda Wehle as Rose Michael, and Rita Wolf as Sally Michael.

== Personal life ==
He married Cynthia Blair Bacon on May 21, 1972; they have two children, Zoe (b. 1983) and Jocelyn (b. 1988).

== Awards and honors ==
- Thomas J. Watson Fellowship
- Rockefeller Foundation Playwright-in-Residence Award, Arena Stage (1979–80)
- PEN/Laura Pels International Foundation for Theater Award, Drama, Master American Dramatist (2008)
- Obie Award for Playwriting, The Vienna Notes (1979)
- Obie Award for Innovative Programming (with David Jones), Brooklyn Academy of Music Theater Company (1979)
- Giles Cooper Award for plays written for BBC Radio, Languages Spoken Here (1987)
- Giles Cooper Award for plays written for BBC Radio, Eating Words (1989)
- Drama Desk Award, Outstanding New Play for Some Americans Abroad (1990)
- Tony Award Nomination for Best New Play, Two Shakespearean Actors (1992)
- Tony Award for Best Book of a Musical, James Joyce's The Dead (2000)
- Tony Award Nomination for Best Musical and Best Original Score, James Joyce's The Dead (2000)
- Drama Desk Award Outstanding New Play Nomination, Franny's Way (2002)
- Drama Desk Award Outstanding Play Nomination, Sorry (2013)
- Drama Desk Award Outstanding Play Nomination, Regular Singing (2014)
- Lortel Award, Best Musical, The Dead (2000)
- New York Drama Critics Award, Best Musical, The Dead (2000)
- Lortel Playwrights’ Sidewalk (2014)
- New York Drama Critics Award, Special Award, The Apple Family plays (both as writer and director) (2014)
- Drama Desk Nomination, 2017, Best Director (for Women and Expect)
- Lifetime Achievement, The Alley Theatre (2023)
- Obie Award, The Rhinebeck Cycle (2023)

== Works ==
=== Theatre ===
- The Killing of Yablonski, Los Angeles, Mark Taper Forum/Lab, 1975
- Conjuring an Event, Los Angeles, Mark Taper Forum/ Lab, 1976
- Scooping, Washington, D.C., Arena Stage, February 4, 1977
- Jungle Coup, New York, Playwrights Horizons, June 22, 1978
- The Vienna Notes, Minneapolis, Minn., The Tyrone Guthrie Theater, October 6, 1978
- Bal, Williamstown, Mass., Williamstown Theatre Festival, July 1979
- Rip Van Winkle, or The Works, New Haven, Conn., Yale Repertory Theatre, December 4, 1981
- The Return of Pinocchio, Seattle, Washington, Empty Space, March 1983
- An American Comedy, Los Angeles, Mark Taper Forum, October 13, 1983
- Between East and West, Seattle, Wash., Seattle Repertory Theatre, March 23, 1984
- Principia Scriptoriae, New York, Manhattan Theatre Club, March 25, 1986
- Chess (bookwriter), New York, Imperial Theatre, April 28, 1988
- Roots in Water, Woodstock, N.Y., River Arts Repertory, Summer 1988
- Some Americans Abroad, Stratford-upon-Avon, Royal Shakespeare Company, July 19, 1989
- Two Shakespearean Actors, Stratford-upon-Avon, Royal Shakespeare Company, 1990
- Columbus and the Discovery of Japan, London, Royal Shakespeare Company, July 22, 1992
- Misha's Party, (with Alexander Gelman), London, Royal Shakespeare Company, July 21, 1993
- Life Sentences, New York, Second Stage Theatre, December 1, 1993
- New England, London, Royal Shakespeare Company, November 29, 1994
- Three Sisters (adaptation of Anton Chekhov), Goodman Theatre, 1995
- The General from America, Stratford-upon-Avon, Royal Shakespeare Company, July 17, 1996
- Kenneth's Play, (with Colin Chambers), London, Royal Shakespeare Company, 1997
- Goodnight Children Everywhere, Stratford-upon-Avon, Royal Shakespeare Company, December 11, 1997
- James Joyce's The Dead, (with Shaun Davey), New York, Playwrights Horizons, October 28, 1999
- Madame Melville, London, Vaudeville Theatre, October 18, 2000
- Franny's Way, New York, Playwrights Horizons, March 27, 2002
- My Life with Albertine, New York, Playwrights Horizons, March 13, 2003
- Rodney's Wife, Williamstown, Mass., Williamstown Theatre Festival, July 7, 2004
- The Seagull (adaption of Anton Chekhov)
- The Suicide (adaption of Nikolai Erdman)
- The Wood Demon (adaptation of Anton Chekhov)
- Frank's Home, Goodman Theatre, December 2006
- Conversations in Tusculum, The Public Theater, March 2008
- That Hopey Changey Thing, The Public Theater, November 2010
- Sweet and Sad, The Public Theater, September 2011
- Sorry, The Public Theater, November 2012
- Nikolai and the Others, Lincoln Center Theater, May 2013
- Regular Singing, The Public Theater, November 2013
- Hungry, The Public Theater, March 2016 (Part 1 of The Gabriels)
- What Did You Expect?, The Public Theater, September 2016 (Part 2 of The Gabriels)
- Women of a Certain Age, The Public Theater, November 2016 (Part 3 of The Gabriels)
- Illyria, The Public Theater, October 2017
- Uncle Vanya (adaption of Anton Chekhov, with Richard Pevear and Larissa Volokhonsky), Old Globe Theater and the Hunter Theater Project, New York City, September 2018
- The Michaels, The Public Theater, October–December 2019
- What Do We Need to Talk About?, The Public Theater (live stream), April 29, 2020
- And So We Come Forth, Apple Family Production (live stream) July 1, 2020
- Incidental Moments Of The Day, Apple Family Productions (ilve stream) September 10, 2020
- What Happened? The Michaels Abroad, Hunter Theatre Project, September 2022
- Little Comedies (adaptation of Anton Chekhov with Richard Pevear and Larissa Volokhonsky), Alley Theater, Houston, October 2023
- Notre Vie Dans L'art (translated by Ariane Mnouchkin), Theatre du Soleil, December 2023
- An Actor Convalescing In Devon, Hampstead Theatre, April–May 2024
- When the Hurlyburly's Done (ЯК СТИХНЕ ШУРУ-БУРЯ ЗЛА), Theater on Podil, Kyiv, March 2025; Public Theater, September 2025
- Springwood, Hampstead Theatre, June–July 2026
- We'll See, The Public Theater, October–November 2026

Nelson's plays are published by Broadway Play Publishing Inc., Faber, & T C G.

=== Radio plays ===
- Languages Spoken Here, BBC Radio 3, December 11, 1987
- Eating Words, BBC Radio 4, October 30, 1989
- Advice to Eastern Europe, BBC Radio 3, December 27, 1990
- The American Wife, BBC Radio 4, January 25, 1996
- Hyde Park-on-Hudson, BBC Radio 3, June 7, 2009

=== Screenplays ===
- Sensibility and Sense, television, American Playhouse, PBS, 1990
- The End of a Sentence, television, American Playhouse, PBS, 1991
- Ethan Frome, film, adapted from the novel by Edith Wharton, 1993; PBS American Playhouse, 1994
- Roots in Water, 2011
- Hyde Park on Hudson, film, Daybreak Pictures, 2012

=== Non-Fiction ===
- A Diary of War and Theatre, Making Theatre in Kyiv, Spring 2024, published by Wordville October 15, 2024
