= Adam Greenfield =

American writer (born 1968)

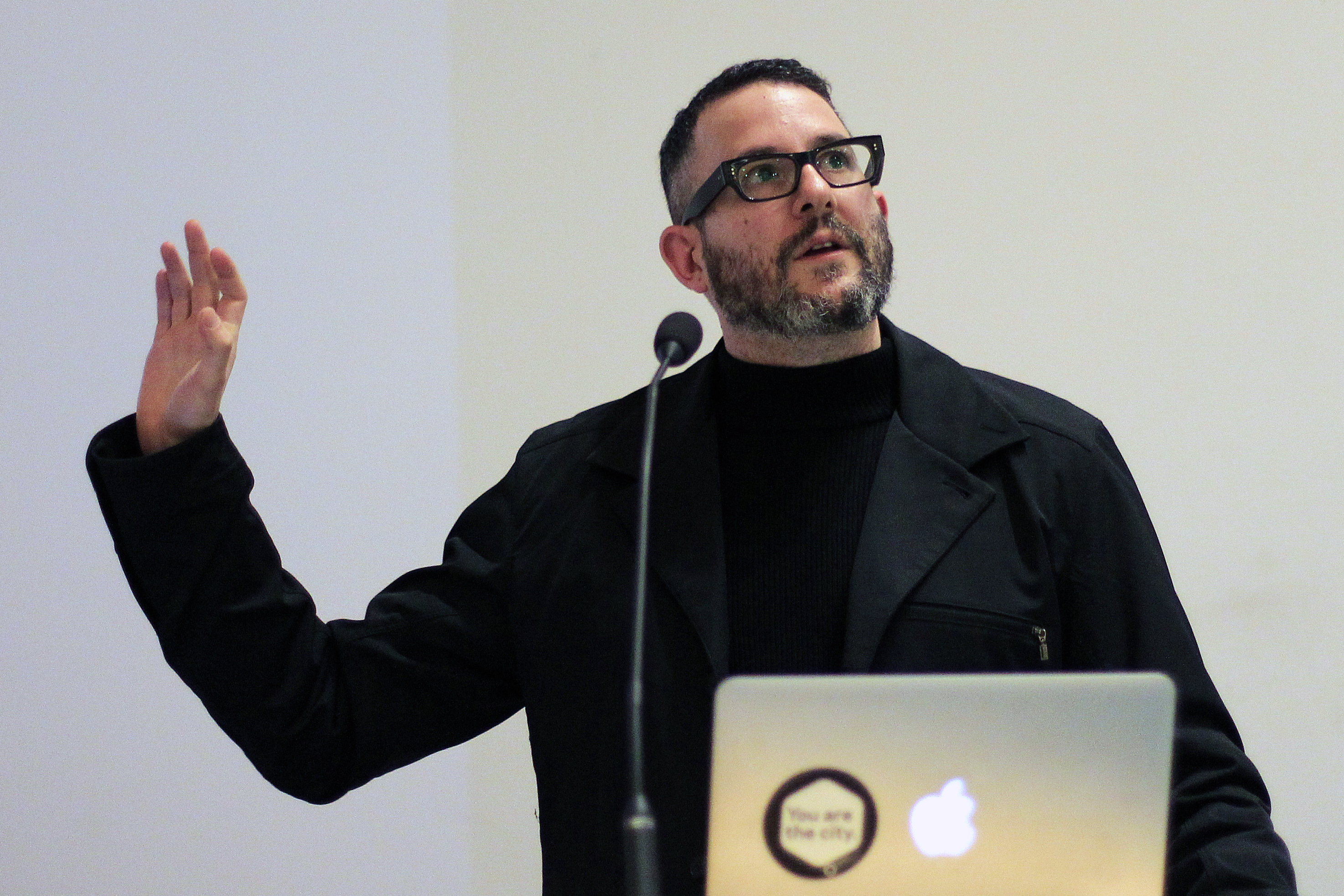
- Greenfield giving a talk in 2015
- Born: 1968 (age 57–58); Philadelphia, Pennsylvania, U.S.
- Education: New York University
- Occupations: Writer, urbanist
- Website: speedbird.wordpress.com

Adam Greenfield (born 1968) is an American writer and urbanist, based in London.

== Early life ==
Greenfield was born in Philadelphia, Pennsylvania, in 1968. He attended New York University, graduating with a degree in cultural studies in 1989. Between 1995 and 2000, he served as a psychological operations specialist (later sergeant) in the United States Army's Special Operations Command.

== Career ==
After leaving the Army, Greenfield began working in the then-nascent field of information architecture for the World Wide Web, holding a succession of positions culminating in employment at the Tokyo office of Razorfish, where he was head of information architecture.

In the 2006 and 2007 academic years, with Kevin Slavin, he co-taught a class at New York University's Interactive Telecommunications Program called Urban Computing. In the following academic year the class was renamed Urban Experience in the Network Age, and Greenfield taught it alone. From 2008 to 2010 he was Nokia's head of design direction for user interface and services, residing in Helsinki throughout the assignment. In 2010 he returned to New York City and founded an urban-systems design practice called Urbanscale, which described their work as "design for networked cities and citizens."

In September 2013, Greenfield was awarded the inaugural Senior Urban Fellowship at the LSE Cities centre of the London School of Economics, relocated to London, and taught in the MArch Urban Design programme at the Bartlett School of Architecture of University College London. As of 2026, he is Visiting Professor in the Sociology Department at LSE.

He has written a number of articles for The Guardian, beginning in 2014.

== Publications ==
- 2006: Everyware: The Dawning Age of Ubiquitous Computing (ISBN 0-321-38401-6), an early exploration of the idea of ubiquitous computing and the internet of things.
- 2007: Urban Computing and Its Discontents (ISBN 978-0-9800994-0-9), (co-author, with Mark Shepard) an overview of informatics for urban environments
- 2013: Against the Smart City (ISBN 978-0-9824383-1-2), describing how technology is implemented in urban contexts, the political drivers and socio-cultural impacts of these efforts.
- 2017: Radical Technologies (ISBN 9781784780432, Verso), about the relationship between new technologies and social forces leading to their adoption or rejection.
- 2024: Lifehouse: Taking Care of Ourselves in A World on Fire (ISBN 978-1788738354), about how individual actions and mutual aid networks emerging in response to crises can evolve into coherent lifestyles. The book highlights a range of global examples, and advocates for local power as a means to harness underutilized capacities amidst catastrophe.
