= Pushing Dead =

2016 comedy film directed by Tom E. Brown

- Film poster
- Directed by: Tom E. Brown
- Written by: Tom E. Brown
- Produced by: Chris Martin; Richard LaGravenese; Eyde Belasco; Jim Bloom
- Starring: James Roday Rodriguez; Danny Glover; Robin Weigert; Khandi Alexander
- Cinematography: Frazer Bradshaw
- Edited by: Robert Schafer
- Music by: Mark Degli Antoni
- Production companies: Bugsby Pictures; Chrismatic Film; Shoreline Entertainment
- Distributed by: Synergetic Distribution
- Release date: June 18, 2016 (Frameline)
- Running time: 110 minutes
- Country: United States
- Language: English

Pushing Dead is Tom E. Brown's debut film, a 2017 American independent comedy drama film written and directed by Brown and starring James Roday Rodriguez, Danny Glover, Robin Weigert and Khandi Alexander.

Pushing Dead follows Dan Schauble (Rodriguez), a struggling writer—HIV-positive for 20+ years— dropped from his health plan for earning too much after he deposits a $100 birthday check. In this new era of sort-of universal care, his only options are long shots: take on a helpless bureaucracy, or come up with $3000 a month to buy his medication.

The production participated in the San Francisco "Scene in San Francisco Incentive Program" administered by the San Francisco Film Commission. Additional support/funding was provided by the Sundance Institute/Rockefeller Foundation

== Cast ==
=== Starring ===
- James Roday Rodriguez as Dan Schauble
- Danny Glover as Bob
- Robin Weigert as Paula
- Khandi Alexander as Dot
- Tom Riley as Mike
- Jerry McDaniel as Gregory

Full Cast
Actor	Role
James Roday Rodriguez	Dan Schauble
Danny Glover	Bob
Robin Weigert	Paula
Khandi Alexander	Dot
Tom Riley	Mike
Jerry McDaniel	Gregory(Lisa)
Tabitha Paigen	Kimberly
Jenny O'Hara	Dan's Mom
Damon Kirsche	Kevin
Mark Truitt	Jim the Ranger
Richard LaGravenese	Mugger
Felix Justice	Donnie
Bob Greene	Doctor Denney
Diana Weng	Doctor
Kashka Banjoko	Body Oil Salesman
Kevin Clarke	Cashier
Erika Perez	Waitress
Michael Sommers	Street Musician
Derrick O'Connor	Sidewalk Salesman
Jon Carlson	Man In Line
Lukas Simmons	Bear-Mask Kid
Emily Popper	Bear-Mask Mom
Oshalla Dee	Nurse #1
Sergio Gonzalez	Nurse #2
Mary Feeley	Nurse #3
Gloria Weinstock	Pharmacist #1^{[a]}
Brady Morales-Woolery	Pharmacist #2
Beth Lisick	Receptionist
Bryan Navarro	Reporter on TV
Carolyn Julia Maloney	News Anchor on TV
Tina Marie Murray	Clerk
David Fine	Client
Jesse Fernandez	Paddleboat Guy
Camille Wainscoat	Paddleboat Woman

^{[a]} Misspelled in film end-credits as 'Parmacist #1'

== Release ==
The film premiered at the Frameline Film Festival on June 18, 2016.

== Reception ==
Awards and Nominations
Year	Awarding Body	Category	Class	Nominee	Outcome
2016	Frameline San Francisco International LGBTQ Film Festival	Best Feature	Audience Award	Tom E. Brown	Won
2016	Cleveland International Film Festival	Best American Independent Feature Film		Tom E. Brown	Nominated
2016	Heartland International Film Festival	Dramatic Feature	Grand Prize for Dramatic Feature	Tom E. Brown	Nominated
2016	Seattle Queer Film Festival	Favorite Narrative Feature	Audience Award	Tom E. Brown	Won
2016	San Francisco Film Critics Circle	Special Citation		Tom E. Brown	Nominated
2016	Calgary International Film Festival	Best Narrative Feature	Discovery Award	Tom E. Brown	Won
2016	Orlando Film Festival	Best Director		Tom E. Brown	Won
2016	Reel Pride Film Festival	Best Feature	Audience Award	Tom E. Brown	Won
2017	Florida Film Festival	Acting	Special Jury Award	Robin Weigert	Won
2017	Ashland Independent Film Festival	Best Narrative Feature	Audience Award	Tom E. Brown	Won
2017	FilmOut San Diego	Best Narrative Feature	FilmOut Festival Award	Tom E. Brown	Won
2017	FilmOut San Diego	Best Actor	FilmOut Festival Award	James Roday Rodriguez	Won
2017	FilmOut San Diego	Best Supporting Actor	FilmOut Festival Award	Danny Glover	Won
2017	Roze Filmdagen Amsterdam (Pink Filmdays Amsterdam) LGBT Film Festival	Best Feature Film	Jury Prize	Tom E. Brown	Won
2017	Santa Domingo OutFest	Best Director	Jury Prize	Tom E. Brown	Won
2018	International Queer Film Festival Playa Del Carmen	Best International Feature Film		Tom E. Brown	Won
2018	International Queer Film Festival Playa Del Carmen	Best Director	Jury Prize	Tom E. Brown	Won

== Music ==
Mark De Gli Antoni is credited with all original music. No official soundtrack or album exists for this film.

Credited songs:
Song title	Writer(s)	Performer(s)
Cast Off Crown	John Dietrich, Satomi Matsuzaki and Greg Saunier	Deerhoof
Born Under a Bad Sign	William Bell and Booker T. Jones Jr.	Booker T & The MGs
Red Medallions	Booker T. Averheart	Booker T. Averheart
Further Away	Don DeBrauwere	Don DeBrauwere
Southern Fried Fun (2nd Movement)	Mickey Foster and George A. Salas	Mickey and The Soul Generation
I Want To Be Free	Harry Krapsho, John Shine, John Raczka	Harry Krapsho
Candle In The Wind	Elton John and Bernard J.P. Taupin	Mark Degli Antoni
Mexico Gringo	Laurent Lombard	
Old Mexico	Jason Matthew Savell (ASCAP)	Jason Matthew Savell (ASCAP)
Candy	Floyd Sydney Newman III	The Mar-Keys
Deep Trouble	Mike Franzman	Mike Franzman
Oh, Yes	Mike Franzman	Mike Franzman
Second Cuzzin'	Mike Franzman	Mike Franzman
Nice Sweater	Mike Franzman	Mike Franzman
Passing Lane	Mike Franzman	Mike Franzman
Grandpa's Theme	Mike Franzman	Mike Franzman
Research	Mike Franzman	Mike Franzman
