= The Hours and Times =

1992 drama film directed by Christopher Münch

- Promotional release poster
- Directed by: Christopher Münch
- Written by: Christopher Münch
- Produced by: Christopher Münch
- Starring: David Angus; Ian Hart
- Cinematography: Christopher Münch
- Edited by: Christopher Münch
- Production company: Antarctic Pictures
- Distributed by: ICA Projects
- Release date: 1992 (United States)
- Running time: 57 minutes
- Country: United States
- Language: English
- Budget: $100,000

The Hours and Times is a 1992 drama film written and directed by Christopher Münch. Starring David Angus and Ian Hart, it is a fictionalized account of what might have happened during a real holiday taken by John Lennon and the Beatles' manager Brian Epstein in 1963.

== Plot ==
It is 1963 and John Lennon flies to Barcelona with the Beatles' manager Brian Epstein for a weekend of relaxation for John. On the flight over they meet air hostess Marianne. John flirts with her and gives her their hotel telephone number.

John asks Brian about gay sex and says that he thinks about it sometimes, but is put off by the thought that it would be painful. They play cards and Brian tells John he is surprised that he brought that up, that he feels awkward about it, that the situation between them is hopeless. John tells him that he finds Brian charming but does not want to have sex with him. He is angry at the thought that everyone they know thinks they are having a sexual relationship. He goes to bed and receives a telephone call from his wife, Cynthia. She says that she misses him, and John says that he misses their son, Julian.

John and Brian go to a gay bar and meet a Spanish man named Quinones. John invites him back to the hotel where the three of them have drinks. Quinones is gay but married. After some friendly conversation he leaves early. Brian is angry with John, calling Quinones a fascist, and saying that nothing matters because he cannot have the one thing he wants. He goes to bed and confides in Miguel, the hotel boy. He asks Miguel for oral sex but then says he is only joking. Later he talks to his mother on the telephone.

The pair look around Barcelona and John takes photographs of Brian. They discuss, among other things, John's relationship with Cynthia, which he does not like to talk to Brian about. John has a bath and plays the harmonica. Brian enters and sits on the bath. John asks him to scrub his back with a flannel, which Brian starts doing. John starts kissing Brian, who quickly undresses and gets into the bath. They kiss a little more, then John abruptly gets out of the bath and leaves the room. Brian finds him smoking in bed. John says he is not angry but can not put into words what he is thinking. The telephone rings, it is Marianne. John tells her to come up. Brian is angry, saying that he is tired of making allowances for people. Marianne arrives and Brian leaves. Marianne asks John why Brian is upset, and they argue. She says that she can see they care about each other but she thinks John torments Brian. She has brought a new Little Richard record, which they dance to.

John asks Brian about his first time in Barcelona. Brian says he was sent there by his mother a couple of years previously following an incident where he had been robbed and blackmailed by a man he met for sex. Following the trial, Brian was forced to see a psychiatrist and his mother sent him to Spain. Two months later he met the Beatles. Brian tries to get John to promise to meet him in Barcelona in ten years, no matter what they are doing. John agrees to at least remember the arrangement.

Later, Brian lies awake in bed with John sleeping next to him. Brian remembers a time when he took John to his "special place", the roof of his family's shop and told John how special the time they spent together was to him. Later, Brian and John plan to go to a bull fight, and John hopes he will not be too squeamish for it.

== Cast ==
- David Angus as Brian Epstein
- Ian Hart as John Lennon
- Stephanie Pack as Marianne
- Robin McDonald as Quiñones
- Sergio Moreno as Miguel
- Unity Grimwood as Epstein's Mother

== Background and production ==
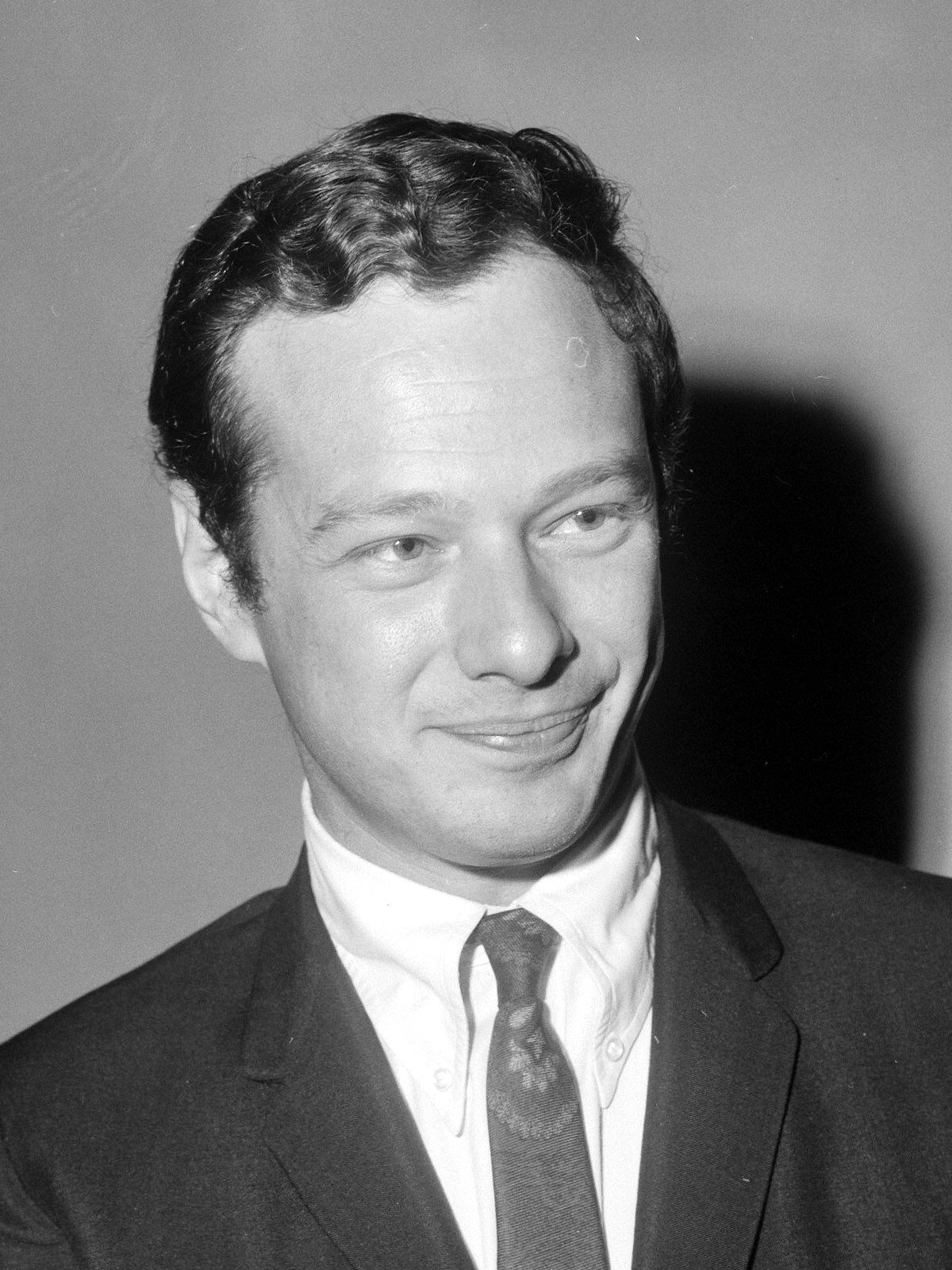
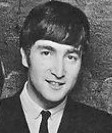
Brian Epstein on the left in 1965, and John Lennon on the right in 1963

External image
- David Angus as Epstein on left, and Ian Hart as Lennon on right via Christopher Münch | Filmmaker

Director Christopher Münch originally saw the project as a "DIY exercise", not expecting the film to secure any distribution. Münch wrote, produced and directed the film, giving him "full control over every aspect of the movie", and said he initially made it for himself. He wrote the script over a few weeks in early 1988 and traveled to England to cast it that spring. The film was made on a shoestring budget of $100,000.

The filming took about four days in Barcelona, with the hotel scenes shot at Avenida Palace Hotel, and a couple of days in London. Münch returned to California where he spent the next two years editing it. The movie's title was inspired by English playwright and poet William Shakespeare's Sonnet 57.

When asked why "this particular project sprung to mind as a film to make", Münch replied:

The script came on pretty fast, arising out of a concern for John Lennon and Brian Epstein's interaction, their emotional situation. Their friendship seemed to embody what I wanted to portray, rather than my being a huge Beatles fan or something. At first I considered making it just about two guys rather than the stars. It is fiction, but they did spend a couple of weeks traveling, not just Barcelona — and the emotional reality of the film is faithful to that friendship.

== Release ==
The movie was released in 1992, after premiering at Toronto, Berlin, Sundance and New Directors. It was released on VHS by Facets Video in 1993. Oscilloscope Labs re-released a restoration of the film in 2019, which was screened in Sundance that year.

== Reception ==
On the review aggregator website Rotten Tomatoes, the film has a score of 82%, based on 17 reviews. Time Out said "Münch presents a lively, subtle conversation piece, an intimate dialogue between two very different men ... whatever really happened, this poignant, fragmentary, assured and beautifully paced film rings true." Film critic Richard Brody opined that the "film offers intellectual archeology, rediscovering states of mind and mood that shook the world; Münch’s calm, contemplative, and quietly astonished direction vibrates with the epochal excitement of the time."

Critic Peter Travers wrote "a compassionate delineation of this kind of friendship is rare in the arts, but Münch's brave and moving film achieves his goal beautifully; it is a small miracle." Author Roland Reiter wrote that while "the topic of homo-eroticism would lead itself to a sensationalist approach in the context of Lennon and Epstein's biographies, Münch describes the relationship between the characters in a sensitive and tasteful way and avoids the danger of stereotyping the characterization of the two friends."

Film critic Donald Lyons commented that "as it traces with extraordinary insight the boundaries of an intense friendship; the movie manages to be at once a case study of two exceptional individuals and a parable of more general suffering; in this sense alone, Münch earns his references to Bach, Bergman, and Shakespeare." Critic B. Ruby Rich stated "Münch's camera style and script are a reprise of cinema verite, as though some dusty reels had been found in a closet in Liverpool and expertly edited ... it's just a simple view of history with the veil of homophobia pulled back."

Emanuel Levy observed that "in his sensitive treatment of a tenuous relationship, Münch shows the shifting balances and imbalances, the steps and countersteps that are expressed in words and gestures. Considering that it deals with celebrities; the film avoids trivializing them and lacks any intimations of gossip or sleaze. Münch deals with particular personalities, but his spare, precise, essay like film illuminates the constraints of any friendship — gay or straight — and the sad realization of friendship's limitations."

== Awards ==
The Hours and Times won the Special Jury Recognition award at the 1992 Sundance Film Festival. It was also nominated for the Grand Jury Prize at the same festival. American film scholar B. Ruby Rich noted that the dramatic jury at Sundance loved it so much, they wanted to give it the Grand Jury Prize, but since it wasn’t feature length they settled on a special jury award. Film critic David Ansen, who was on the jury, confirmed Rich's account, stating "we all thought it was the best movie there, but because of its length it wasn't eligible to receive the best-film prize. We were tempted to break the rules but settled for giving it a special jury prize. Such is the fate of fifty-five-minute movies."

== See also ==
- Christopher Münch filmography
- The Beatles in film
- List of American films of 1992
- List of LGBTQ-related films of 1992
