= Christopher Munch =

American film director (born 1962)

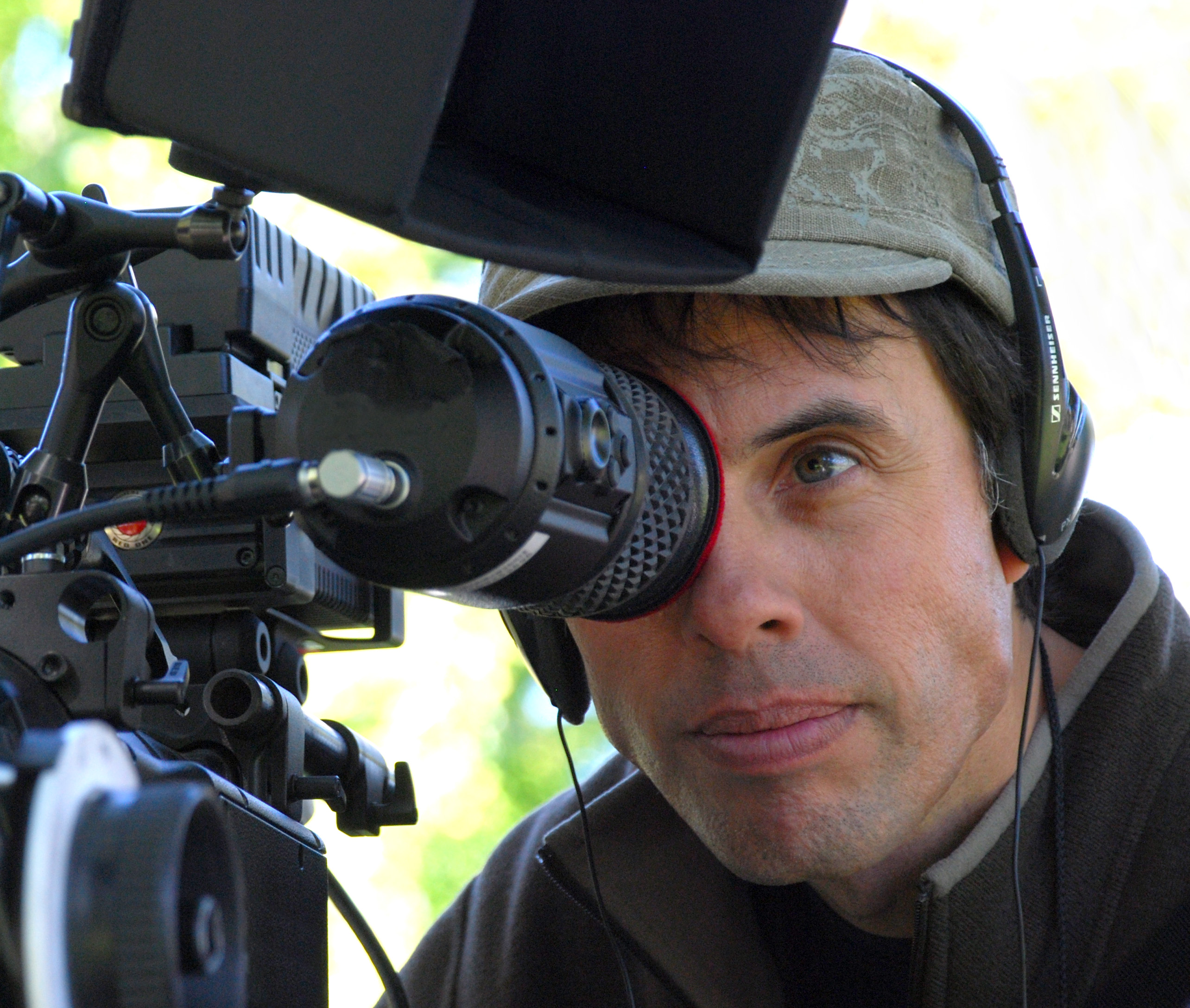
- Munch on the set of Letters from the Big Man in 2009
- Born: June 17, 1962 (age 64); Pasadena, California, United States
- Occupations: film director, screenwriter, film producer
- Years active: 1987–present

Christopher Munch (born June 17, 1962) is an American film director, screenwriter and producer known for The Hours and Times (1991), Color of a Brisk and Leaping Day (1996), The Sleepy Time Gal (2001), Harry + Max (2004), Letters from the Big Man (2011), and The 11th Green (2020). Five of his features screened at the Sundance Film Festival, where The Hours and Times received a Special Jury Prize. Letters from the Big Man and The 11th Green were named Critics' Picks by The New York Times. Munch received a Guggenheim Fellowship in filmmaking in 1994, and a Creative Capital Award in 2000.

== Early life and work ==
Munch was born in 1962 in Pasadena, California, where his father, the Mexican astrophysicist Guido Münch, was then an astronomer at Caltech. He grew up with his mother in La Jolla, San Diego. When he was 15 years old, he directed a prize-winning documentary about the animals at the San Diego Zoo. In 1977 and 1978, one of his Super 8 shorts and two of his 16 mm shorts were broadcast as part of KPBS-TV’s young filmmakers’ programs; KPBS later employed him part-time while he was still in high school. During the 1980s, he shot two self-financed features: Goldenoise, which remained unfinished, and In Laura's Garden, which screened at the 9th Independent Feature Film Market in 1987 but was not released.

== Career ==
=== 1987–2000 ===
In late 1987, Munch wrote The Hours and Times, a fictionalized account of the relationship between John Lennon and his manager Brian Epstein. He shot the film principally over four days in Barcelona in 1988, with Juan Carlos Valls as the sole crew member; additional filming took place in England. Munch edited the film in California and completed it in 1991. It premiered at the Toronto Festival of Festivals and won awards at the Sundance Film Festival, the Berlin International Film Festival and the Independent Spirit Awards; it also screened at New Directors/New Films. Its 58-minute running time complicated theatrical distribution, although James Schamus and Ted Hope's Good Machine supported its release. Amy Taubin of The Village Voice called it “the best American indie in many, many years,” and it appeared on several Film Comment critics' ten-best lists for 1992. The film became associated with New Queer Cinema, and Richard Brody later included it in his New Yorker list of the greatest independent films of the twentieth century.

Munch next made Color of a Brisk and Leaping Day, a drama set in 1945 about a second-generation Chinese American attempting to save the struggling Yosemite Valley Railroad. Loosely based on a true story Munch had read as a child, it was shot on location in 1994. Rob Sweeney's black-and-white cinematography received the Cinematography Award at the 1996 Sundance Film Festival. Critics noted the film's visual ambition as well as its meditation on a vanished past; Janet Maslin of The New York Times called it “dreamy, intense and finally elusive” and described its imagery as “extraordinarily eloquent and pure.” The film screened at Sundance, New Directors/New Films, and festivals including Locarno, Toronto, Rotterdam, and Hong Kong. Munch received the Someone to Watch Award at the 1996 Independent Spirit Awards.

Written in 1996–97 and inspired by events in Munch's mother's life, The Sleepy Time Gal concerns a woman searching for the daughter she relinquished for adoption, who is also searching for her mother. Limited financing required the film to be shot intermittently over two and a half years, beginning in New York in 1997 and continuing in California and other locations. In 2000, Munch received the Moving Image Creative Capital Award. Jacqueline Bisset, Martha Plimpton, and Nick Stahl starred. Completed in 2000, it premiered at Sundance in 2001. It subsequently screened at Munich and Edinburgh, while the Rencontres internationales de cinéma à Paris included it in a three-film retrospective of Munch's work. Kevin Thomas of the Los Angeles Times wrote that the film had “a depth, range and subtlety far greater than most American films,” and other reviewers praised its narrative pull and emotional complexity. Dennis Lim included it in his top ten for the Village Voice’s 2002 critics’ poll. The Sundance Channel premiered the film in 2002 and released it on home video the following year.

=== 2001–2013 ===
Munch next wrote and directed Harry + Max, about two pop-star brothers confronting the boundaries of their unusually close relationship, which was shot in the spring of 2003 on a 17-day schedule with a small crew and limited budget. It premiered at Sundance in 2004 and was released theatrically by TLA Releasing in 2005.

Over the next four years, Munch developed Letters from the Big Man as a serious, non-genre treatment of Sasquatch, centered on the bond between a female scientist and a forest-dwelling creature in southern Oregon. He shot the film on location in 2009 with Lily Rabe starring and Rob Sweeney as cinematographer. It premiered at Sundance in 2011. Critics emphasized both its unusual approach to the Sasquatch legend and its treatment of landscape: James Greenberg of The Hollywood Reporter called it an “original and affecting” interpretation, while Mike Goodridge in Screen Daily and Melissa Anderson in Artforum praised its contemplative depiction of the natural world. Manohla Dargis’s review in The New York Times was designated a Critics’ Pick.

In 2011, Munch was awarded a MacDowell residency to work on a screenplay about the physicist brothers Robert and Frank Oppenheimer, and in 2013 received an Alfred P. Sloan Fast Track Grant to continue the project. He also wrote and directed the science-fiction short Return to Elektra Springs for the Independent Television Service as part of its Futurestates series.

=== 2014–present ===
Munch has described Return to Elektra Springs as a prelude to The 11th Green, which he began writing around 2013-2014. The film combines UFO mythology with a speculative account of American political history, centering on a journalist investigating alleged contact between President Dwight D. Eisenhower and an extraterrestrial visitor. It premiered at the Palm Springs International Film Festival in January 2020. Sheri Linden of The Hollywood Reporter called it a “thoughtful and compelling what-if,” while reviewers frequently noted the contrast between its speculative subject matter and its restrained style, understated performances, and deadpan humor. Glenn Kenny’s review in The New York Times designated it a Critics’ Pick, and Richard Brody included it in his list of the best films of 2020 for The New Yorker.

== Style and themes ==
Across genres, Munch's films repeatedly address memory, mortality, private longing, and the difficulty of communicating with those one loves. Graham Fuller described his protagonists as pursuing “impossible dreams” and connected his work to questions of memory, consciousness, and mortality. Bérénice Reynaud characterized the films as attentive to minute details of experience and to the hidden, often contradictory traces that individual lives leave upon others. Fuller described Color of a Brisk and Leaping Day as an exploration of the elegiac mode rather than an elegy, and Brody emphasized the ways memory, family history, and social convention shape identity in The Sleepy Time Gal. Fuller also writes "It's a cinema of secret histories" while Reynaud also commented "his cinema explores the traces left by forgotten (or not-so-forgotten) lives."

Critics have also emphasized the restraint and understatement of Munch's direction. His films frequently place speculative, historical, or potentially melodramatic material within intimate settings, relying on dialogue, gesture, and subdued performances rather than overt dramatic emphasis. They often combine documented history with conjecture or myth; Dennis Lim described them as “testaments to private obsession and imagination.” Reviewers have likewise treated landscape as an expressive element, connecting it to historical memory, ecological awareness, or metaphysical speculation. In 1996, Munch cited Ingmar Bergman, Michelangelo Antonioni, Satyajit Ray, Agnès Varda, Stanley Kubrick, and Terrence Malick as principal cinematic influences.

== Archive ==
The moving image collection of Christopher Munch is held at the Academy Film Archive.

== Filmography ==
- 1991: The Hours and Times
- 1996: Color of a Brisk and Leaping Day
- 2001: The Sleepy Time Gal
- 2004: Harry + Max
- 2011: Letters from the Big Man
- 2013: Return to Elektra Springs (Short film)
- 2020: The 11th Green
