= List of Ally Sheedy performances =

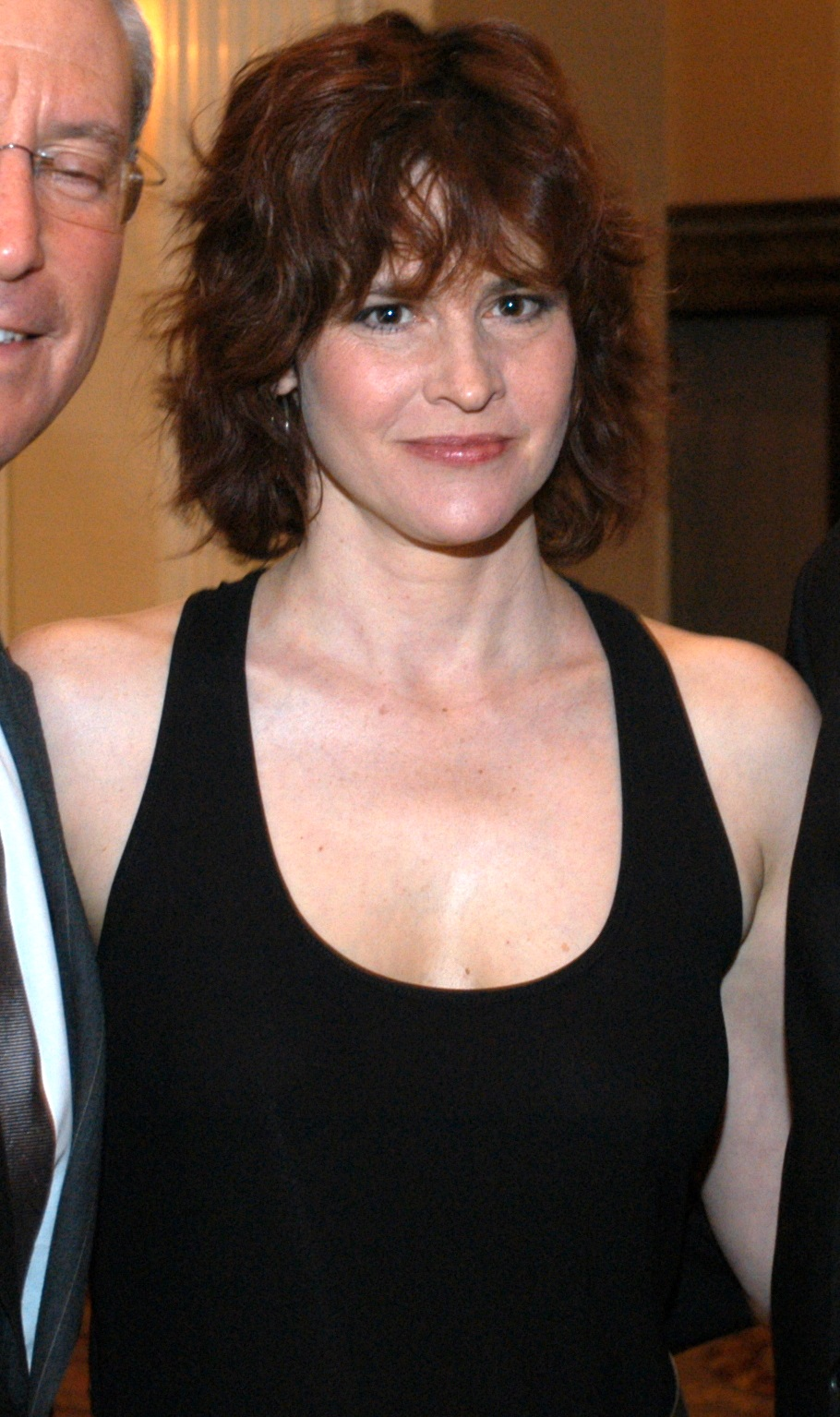
Sheedy in 2003

Ally Sheedy is an American actress. She has worked in the mediums of film, television and theatre.

== Film ==
| Year | Title | Role | Notes | Ref. |
|---|---|---|---|---|
| 1983 | Bad Boys | J.C. Walenski | | |
| 1983 | WarGames | Jennifer Mack | | |
| 1984 | Oxford Blues | Rona | | |
| 1985 | The Breakfast Club | Allison Reynolds | | |
| 1985 | Twice in a Lifetime | Helen Mackenzie | | |
| 1985 | St. Elmo's Fire | Leslie Hunter | | |
| 1986 | Blue City | Annie Rayford | | |
| 1986 | Short Circuit | Stephanie Speck | | |
| 1987 | Maid to Order | Jessie Montgomery | | |
| 1987 | A Day Like Any Other | | Short film | |
| 1988 | She's Having a Baby | Self | Uncredited cameo | |
| 1988 | Short Circuit 2 | Stephanie Speck | Uncredited vocal cameo | |
| 1989 | Heart of Dixie | Maggie DeLoach | | |
| 1990 | Betsy's Wedding | Connie Hopper | | |
| 1990 | Fear | Cayce Bridges | | |
| 1991 | Only the Lonely | Theresa Luna | | |
| 1992 | Home Alone 2: Lost in New York | Pam Block | Cameo | |
| 1993 | The Pickle | Molly-Girl/Self | | |
| 1993 | Man's Best Friend | Lori Tanner | | |
| 1995 | One Night Stand | Mickey Sanderson | | |
| 1996 | Amnesia | Martha Keller | | |
| 1997 | Macon County Jail | Susan Reed | | |
| 1998 | High Art | Lucy Berliner | | |
| 1998 | Myth America | | Direct-to-video | |
| 1999 | Sugar Town | Liz | | |
| 1999 | The Autumn Heart | Deborah | | |
| 1999 | I'll Take You There | Bernice | | |
| 1999 | Advice from a Caterpillar | Jan | | |
| 1999 | The Definite Maybe | Joanne | | |
| 2002 | Just a Dream | Maureen Sturbuck | | |
| 2002 | Happy Here and Now | Lois | | |
| 2002 | Highball | Self | | |
| 2003 | A Good Night to Die | Marie | | |
| 2003 | Shelter Island | Louise 'Lou' Delamere | | |
| 2004 | Noise | Charlotte Bancroft | | |
| 2005 | Shooting Livien | Brea Epling | | |
| 2007 | Day Zero | Dr. Reynolds | | |
| 2007 | The Junior Defenders | Jill Fields | Direct-to-video | |
| 2007 | Steam | Laurie | | |
| 2008 | Harold | Maureen Clemens | | |
| 2009 | Perestroika | Helen | | |
| 2009 | Life During Wartime | Helen Jordan | | |
| 2010 | Welcome to the Rileys | Harriet | | |
| 2010 | Ten Stories Tall | Jackie | | |
| 2014 | Sins of Our Youth | Vicki | | |
| 2014 | Fugly! | Stoddard | | |
| 2016 | Little Sister | Joani Lunsford | | |
| 2016 | X-Men: Apocalypse | Scott Summers' teacher | Cameo | |
| 2023 | Chantilly Bridge | Elizabeth | | |
| 2024 | Brats | Self | Documentary | |
| 2026 | By the Roots | Barbara Heisler | Also executive producer | |

== Television ==
| Year | Title | Role | Notes | Ref. |
|---|---|---|---|---|
| 1981 | CBS Afternoon Playhouse | Cathy | Episode: "I Think I'm Having a Baby" | |
| 1981 | The Best Little Girl in the World | 1st Girl | Television film | |
| 1981 | The Violation of Sarah McDavid | Tracy Barnes | Television film | |
| 1981 | Homeroom | Karen Chase | Pilot | |
| 1981 | The Day the Loving Stopped | Debbie Danner | Television film | |
| 1981 | Splendor in the Grass | Hazel | Television film | |
| 1982 | Strike Force | Delores | Episode: "Internal Affairs" | |
| 1982 | Chicago Story | Beth Thompson | Episode: "Bright Lights, Big City" | |
| 1982 | St. Elsewhere | Diane | Episode: "Samuels and the Kid" | |
| 1983 | Hill Street Blues | Kristen | 3 episodes | |
| 1983 | Deadly Lessons | Marita Armstrong | Television film | |
| 1987 | We Are the Children | Annie Keats | Television film | |
| 1990 | The Lost Capone | Kathleen Hart | Television film | |
| 1992 | Tattle Tale | Laura Perot | Television film | |
| 1992 | Kurt Vonnegut's Monkey House | | Episode: "Epicac" | |
| 1992 | Red Shoe Diaries | Karen | Episode: "Accidents Happen" (or "The Fling") | |
| 1993 | Lethal Exposure | Chris Cassidy | Television film | |
| 1993 | Chantilly Lace | Elizabeth | Television film | |
| 1993 | The Hidden Room | Julia | Episode: "Hungry Girls" | |
| 1994 | Ultimate Betrayal | Mary Rodgers | Television film | |
| 1994 | Parallel Lives | Louise | Television film | |
| 1994 | The Haunting of Seacliff Inn | Susan Enright | Television film | |
| 1995 | The Tin Soldier | Billy's Mom | Television film | |
| 1996 | The Outer Limits | Carter Jones | Episode: "I Hear You Calling" | |
| 1996 | Hijacked: Flight 285 | Deni Patton | Television film | |
| 1997 | Country Justice | Angie Baker | Television film | |
| 1997 | Buried Alive II | Laura Riskin | Television film | |
| 1998 | The Fury Within | Joanna Hanlon | Television film | |
| 1999 | Our Guys: Outrage at Glen Ridge | Det. Kelly Brooks | Television film | |
| 2001 | Oz | Lisa Logan | Episode: "Medium Rare" | |
| 2001 | The Warden | Helen Hewitt | Television film | |
| 2001 | Strange Frequency | Lee Bonner | Episode: "Daydream Believer" | |
| 2002 | Once and Again | Miriam Rose Miller | Episode: "Aaron's List of Dreams" | |
| 2002 | The Interrogation of Michael Crowe | Cheryl Crowe | Television film | |
| 2003 | The Dead Zone | Kate Moore | Television film | |
| 2003 | Life on the Line | Chris McHugh | Television film | |
| 2006 | The Veteran | Sara Reid | Television film | |
| 2007 | CSI: Crime Scene Investigation | Shannon Turner | Episode: "Leapin' Lizards" | |
| 2008–2009 | Kyle XY | Sarah | 4 episodes | |
| 2009 | Citizen Jane | Jane Alexander | Television film | |
| 2009–2013 | Psych | Yang | 4 episodes | |
| 2012 | Modern Love | Beth | Television film | |
| 2013 | Full Circle | Celeste Fontaine | 2 episodes | |
| 2014 | Not with My Daughter | Melissa Eco | Television film; also titled Client Seduction | |
| 2015 | Motive | Stephanie Carson | Episode: "Calling the Shots" | |
| 2019 | SMILF | Fiona | Episode: "Single Mom in Love Forever" | |
| 2022–2023 | Single Drunk Female | Carol Fink | 2 seasons; Main role | |
| 2025 | Wild Cards | Rose Pruett | Episode: "Once a Con a Time in the West" | |

== Stage ==
| Year | Title | Role | Venue | Ref. |
|---|---|---|---|---|
| 1999 | Hedwig and the Angry Inch | Hedwig | Jane Street Theatre | |

== Music videos ==
| Year | Title | Artist | Role | Ref. |
|---|---|---|---|---|
| 1985 | "St. Elmo's Fire (Man in Motion)" | John Parr | Leslie Hunter | |
| 1986 | "Who's Johnny" | El DeBarge | Stephanie Speck | |
| 1990 | "No Way" | Valentine | Fan | |

== Audio drama ==
| Year | Title | Role | Ref. |
|---|---|---|---|
| 2025 | Summer Breeze | | |
