= St. Elmo's Fire (film) =

1985 film

- Theatrical release poster
- Directed by: Joel Schumacher
- Written by: Joel Schumacher; Carl Kurlander
- Produced by: Lauren Shuler
- Starring: Rob Lowe; Demi Moore; Emilio Estevez; Ally Sheedy; Judd Nelson; Mare Winningham; Andrew McCarthy; Martin Balsam; Andie MacDowell
- Cinematography: Stephen H. Burum
- Edited by: Richard Marks
- Music by: David Foster
- Production company: Channel-Lauren Shuler
- Distributed by: Columbia Pictures
- Release date: June 28, 1985
- Running time: 108 minutes
- Country: United States
- Language: English
- Budget: $10 million
- Box office: $37.8 million

St. Elmo's Fire is a 1985 American coming-of-age drama film co-written and directed by Joel Schumacher and starring Emilio Estevez, Rob Lowe, Andrew McCarthy, Demi Moore, Judd Nelson, Ally Sheedy, Andie MacDowell and Mare Winningham. It centers on a clique of recent graduates of Washington, D.C.'s Georgetown University, and their adjustment to post-university life and the responsibilities of adulthood. The film is a prominent movie of the Brat Pack genre. It was released by Columbia Pictures on June 28, 1985, receiving negative reviews from critics but was a box-office hit, grossing $37.8 million on a $10 million budget.

== Plot ==
Recent Georgetown University graduates Alec Newberry, Leslie Hunter, Kevin Dolenz, Jules Van Patten, and Kirby Keager wait to hear about the conditions of their friends: Wendy Beamish, a sweet-natured young woman devoted to helping others, and Billy Hicks, a former fraternity boy and now reluctant husband and father, after a minor car accident caused by Billy's drinking. At the hospital, Kirby spots an intern named Dale Biberman, with whom he has been infatuated since college.

The group gathers at their favorite college hangout, St. Elmo's Bar. Billy has been fired from the job that Alec helped him secure. At their apartment, Alec pressures Leslie to marry him, but she thinks they are unprepared. Kirby is telling Kevin of his love for Dale when Billy shows up, asking to spend the night as he cannot cope with his wife Felicia. Jules accuses Kevin of being gay and loving Alec. When Kevin visits Alec and Leslie for dinner, Alec confesses to Kevin that he recently had sex with a lingerie saleswoman.

Billy and Wendy get drunk together, and Wendy reveals that she is a virgin. They kiss, and Billy, tugging at her clothing, makes fun of her girdle. Wendy insists they remain platonic friends. At St. Elmo's during a Halloween party, Jules reveals to Leslie that she is having an affair with her married boss Forrester Davidson. Billy sees Felicia with another man in the crowd and attacks him. Billy is thrown out of the bar but reconciles with Felicia. The women confront Jules about her affair and reckless spending, but she insists that everything is under control.

Kirby takes a job working for Kim Sung Ho, a wealthy Korean businessman, and invites Dale to a party at Mr. Kim's house, which he is using without Mr. Kim's permission. Wendy arrives with Howie Krantz, an ungainly Jewish boy whom her parents want her to marry. Alec announces that he and Leslie are engaged, upsetting her. She confronts him about her suspicions of his infidelity, and the two break up. Alec accuses Kevin of telling Leslie about the tryst with the lingerie woman. Jules gives Billy a ride home, and Billy makes a pass at her. Furious, Jules orders him out of her car; Felicia witnesses the confrontation.

When Dale skips the party, Kirby drives to the ski lodge where she is staying and meets her boyfriend Guy. Kirby's borrowed car gets stuck, and Dale and Guy invite him in. The next morning, as Kirby prepares to leave the lodge, Dale tells him that she is flattered by his interest in her. He kisses her, and then Guy takes a photo of them before he leaves.

Leslie goes to Kevin's apartment to spend the night after the breakup and discovers photographs of her. Kevin confesses his love for her, and the two have sex. Alec goes to the apartment to apologize to Kevin and finds Leslie there.

Wendy tells her father that she wants to be independent and move into her own place. Jules has been fired from her job, fallen behind on her credit card payments, and her possessions have been seized. She locks herself in her apartment and opens the windows, intending to freeze to death. Her friends attempt to coax her out, but she is unresponsive. Kirby fetches Billy, who landed a job at a gas station courtesy of Kevin, to calm Jules down. Billy convinces Jules to let him in, and they talk about the challenges of life, overheard by the rest of the gang.

Wendy moves into her own place; Billy visits and informs her that he is getting a divorce and moving to New York City to try making it as a musician, and the two have sex. At the bus station, the group gathers once more to say goodbye to Billy. Billy urges Alec to make up with Leslie, but she declares that she does not want to date anyone for a while. Alec and Kevin make up, and the group makes plans to meet for brunch. However, they decide not to go to St. Elmo's and instead choose Houlihan's because there are "not so many kids" there.

== Cast ==
- Emilio Estevez as Kirby Keager, a law student and waiter at St. Elmo's Bar
- Rob Lowe as William "Billy" Hicks, a saxophonist "frat boy" and reluctant husband and father
- Andrew McCarthy as Kevin Dolenz, a writer for The Washington Post with a sullen streak, and Kirby's roommate
- Demi Moore as Julianna "Jules" Van Patten, an international banker and the "party girl" of the group
- Judd Nelson as Alec Newberry, a romantically unfaithful yuppie pursuing a career in politics
- Ally Sheedy as Leslie Hunter, a budding architect who is reluctant to marry Alec
- Mare Winningham as Wendy Beamish, a social worker from a wealthy family who is devoted to helping others
- Martin Balsam as Mr. Beamish, Wendy's father
- Andie MacDowell as Dale Biberman, a hospital intern and the object of Kirby's affection
- Joyce Van Patten as Mrs. Beamish, Wendy's mother
- Jenny Wright as Felicia Hicks, Billy's wife
- Blake Clark as Wally, bar owner of St. Elmo's Fire
- Jon Cutler as Howie Krantz, an employee at Wendy's family business who becomes interested in Wendy
- Matthew Laurance as Ron Dellasandro, Jules' gay neighbor
- Gina Hecht as Judith, Dale's roommate
- Anna Maria Horsford as Naomi, a streetwalker who plies her trade near Kevin and Kirby's apartment
- James Carrington as Guy, Dale's boyfriend

== Production ==
=== Development ===
The film was announced in July 1984. It was executive produced by Ned Tanen. Tanen also produced The Breakfast Club and it and St. Elmo's Fire were dubbed The Little Chills, in reference to the film The Big Chill. "These are both movies that no one has ever seen before", said Tanen.

=== Casting ===
According to Joel Schumacher, "a lot of people turned down the script ... the head of [one] major studio called its seven-member cast 'the most loathsome humans he had ever read on the page'". The producers interviewed "hundreds of people" for the cast, including Anthony Edwards, Jon Cryer and Lea Thompson. According to Lauren Shuler Donner, she found Emilio Estevez, Judd Nelson and Ally Sheedy through recommendations from John Hughes, who had cast them in The Breakfast Club; Schumacher said he had to "push hard" to get the studio to agree to cast the three. Demi Moore had to go to rehab before shooting.

"I think there are people who go to college because it's kind of what's accepted", said Rob Lowe. "I feel unfortunately sometimes it's used as a holding tank, waiting to go into the real world, instead of for education. I think there are people who can go into the marketplace after high school and do well." "I think I'm probably going to be criticized a lot", said Nelson. "My character is very straight, very conservative, very career-oriented. After Breakfast Club, I think people will say I should have played another street punk. They'll criticize me for not doing what I'm good at, for trying something new." "It's refreshing to play someone who isn't defined by who her boyfriend is or what her body looks like", said Sheedy. "I did feel a little like the new kid in class", said Moore.

David Blum coined the term Brat Pack after meeting members of the cast on the occasion of the release of St. Elmo's Fire.

=== Filming ===
Principal photography began early October 1984, just after executive producer Ned Tanen had been appointed as president of Paramount Pictures' motion picture division. The private Catholic Jesuit Georgetown University would not permit filming on campus, with their administrators citing questionable content such as premarital sex. As a result, the university seen on film is the public University of Maryland located 10 miles (15 km) away in College Park. "I loved wearing the clothes", said Moore, "I've always been such a tom boy."

== Reception ==
=== Critical response ===
David Denby called Schumacher "brutally untalented" and said that "nobody over the moral age of fifteen" will like the work of the Brat Pack actors in the film:

St. Elmo's Fire isn't drama, it's gossip, and peculiarly early-adolescent gossip—a movie designed to be picked apart on the telephone. The turbidly self-important treatment of these vacuous college graduates, each one a "type", is like a TV sitcom without jokes. St. Elmo's Fire is so depressing a portent of Hollywood's teen sycophancy because it not only devotes itself to stupid kids, it accepts their view of the world without any real criticism ... The sole survivor of the general disaster is Ally Sheedy, who manages to make something charming out of the yup petulance.

Janet Maslin, film critic for The New York Times, shot the movie down:

In the realm of films about close-knit bands of school friends, St. Elmo's Fire falls midway between The Big Chill and The Breakfast Club. Its characters are old enough to enjoy the first flushes of prosperity, but still sufficiently youthful to keep their self-absorption intact. But soon enough, they will be forced to give up their late-night carousing at a favorite bar and move on to more responsible lives. In the film's terms, which are distinctly limited, this will mean finding a more sedate hangout and learning to go there for brunch ... St. Elmo's Fire is most appealing when it simply gives the actors a chance to flirt with the camera, and with one another. When it attempts to take seriously the problems of characters who are spoiled, affluent and unbearably smug, it becomes considerably less attractive ... St. Elmo's Fire is as good a film as any to put into a time capsule this year—to show what and whom young viewers want, and how eager Hollywood is to give it to them.

On Rotten Tomatoes, the film has an approval rating of 44% from 48 reviews, with an average rating of 5.4/10. The site's critical consensus reads: "St. Elmo's Fire is almost peak Brat Pack: it's got the cast, the fashion, and the music, but the characters are too frequently unlikable." On Metacritic the film has a weighted average score of 35 out of 100, based on reviews from 15 critics.

Rob Lowe won a Golden Raspberry Award for Worst Supporting Actor for his work in this film at the 6th Golden Raspberry Awards.

In a 2015 retrospective review, Justin Gerber of Consequence of Sound said that he was "prepared to say it's the worst movie of all time, with all the necessary stipulations lined up and accounted for", going on to criticize the characters, plot, set, direction, and even score.

Critic Joe Queenan, in his 1998 book Red Lobster, White Trash and the Blue Lagoon, opined that St. Elmo's Fire was one of those movies "that remind us that the eighties were far, far worse than any of us can recall today, and by helping these monsters get their careers off the ground, we will be paying for our sins for decades to come."

=== Box office ===
The film opened strongly, earning $6.1 million in its first week.

The film ended up making $37.8 million, outperforming box office disappointments from Columbia Pictures that year Silverado, The Bride and Perfect.

== Soundtrack ==
The film's soundtrack was the first soundtrack written by Canadian composer/producer David Foster. "When I was writing the score to St. Elmo's Fire, I loved it", he said. "But for that month and a half or so that I had to write the songs, it just felt like doing my regular job."

"St. Elmo's Fire (Man in Motion)" was written by John Parr and Foster. Foster had been impressed by Parr's song "Naughty Naughty" and invited him to perform the title track for the St. Elmo's Fire film. Originally, another song was chosen which Parr disliked. "That song sounded like Fame II or Flashdance II," Parr later said. "I thought the movie was supposed to have more class than that. It was a regurgitated song, and I didn't really want to sing it."

Foster showed Parr a news clip about the Canadian athlete Rick Hansen, who at the time was going around the world in his wheelchair to raise awareness for spinal cord injuries. His journey was called the "Man in Motion Tour". Parr decided to help the campaign by writing words that would fit vaguely with the film, but which directly referenced Hansen's efforts.

According to Parr, he and Foster wrote "St. Elmo's Fire (Man in Motion)" "very fast, between 2 and 4 on Friday afternoon". Director Joel Schumacher had given Parr rough guidelines for the lyrics. "He wanted a song about determination", Parr recalled. "He wanted a song about kids who are growing up and have to make decisions about what to do with their lives. That's what the movie is about." Parr added, "In the movie, St. Elmo's is a bar. But to me, St. Elmo's Fire is a magical thing glowing in the sky that holds destiny to someone. It's mystical and sacred. It's where paradise lies, like the end of the rainbow."

"St. Elmo's Fire (Man in Motion)" hit No. 1 on the Billboard Hot 100 chart and remained there for two weeks in September 1985, and "Love Theme from St. Elmo's Fire" (the instrumental theme to the movie by David Foster) reached No. 15. The song did not appear on any Parr album until Letter to America was released in July 2011.

The song "Give Her a Little Drop More", which plays during the movie when the characters enter St. Elmo's Bar & Restaurant, was written by British jazz trumpeter John Chilton.

Another version of "Love Theme from St. Elmo's Fire" with lyrics, titled "For Just a Moment", was performed by Amy Holland and Donny Gerrard and was included as the final song on the soundtrack album.

=== Track listing ===
St. Elmo's Fire (Original Motion Picture Soundtrack)
| No. | Title | Writer(s) | Producer(s) | Length |
|---|---|---|---|---|
| 1. | "St. Elmo's Fire (Man in Motion)" (John Parr) | David Foster; John Parr | David Foster | 4:08 |
| 2. | "Shake Down" (Billy Squier) | Billy Squier | Foster | 4:07 |
| 3. | "Young and Innocent" (Elefante) | John Elefante; Dino Elefante | Foster; John Elefante; Dino Elefante | 4:34 |
| 4. | "This Time It Was Really Right" (Jon Anderson) | Foster; Jon Anderson | Foster | 4:39 |
| 5. | "Saved My Life" (Fee Waybill) | Foster; Fee Waybill; Steve Lukather | Foster | 3:45 |
| 6. | "Love Theme from St. Elmo's Fire (Instrumental)" (David Foster) | Foster | Foster; Humberto Gatica | 3:27 |
| 7. | "If I Turn You Away" (Vikki Moss) | Foster; Richard Marx | Foster | 4:38 |
| 8. | "Stressed Out (Close to the Edge)" (Airplay) | Foster; Jay Graydon; Stephen A. Kipner; Peter Beckett | Jay Graydon; Foster | 4:14 |
| 9. | "Georgetown" (David Foster) | Foster | Foster | 1:34 |
| 10. | "Love Theme from St. Elmo's Fire (For Just a Moment)" (Donny Gerrard and Amy Holland) | Foster; Cynthia Weil | Foster; Gatica (co.) | 3:48 |

=== Charts ===
| Chart (1985–1986) | Peak position |
|---|---|
| Australia (Kent Music Report) | 90 |
| Canada Top Albums/CDs (RPM) | 16 |
| New Zealand Albums (RMNZ) | 40 |
| Swedish Albums (Sverigetopplistan) | 42 |
| US Billboard 200 | 21 |

== Future ==
In August 2009, Sony Pictures Television received a "script commitment with a penalty attached to it" to adapt the film into a television series, which would "use the movie as a takeoff point and as an inspiration as it introduces six new friends: three boys and three girls." Topher Grace and Gordon Kaywin of Sargent Hall Productions proposed the idea to Jamie Tarses; the three of them then recruited Dan Bucatinsky to write the pilot and Schumacher agreed to the concept. After remaining in development hell by August 2019, it was reported that NBC was developing a television series with Josh Berman attached as writer and executive producer.

In June 2024, following the successful release of the documentary Brats which reunited the Brat Pack, it was announced that a legacy sequel is in early development from Sony Pictures. It would hinge upon Andrew McCarthy, Emilio Estevez, Rob Lowe, Demi Moore, Judd Nelson, Ally Sheedy and Mare Winningham reprising their roles from the original movie.

In June 2025, Rob Lowe confirmed to People magazine that a script for a sequel is still being worked on.
