= Brat Pack =

Group of young American actors in the 1980s

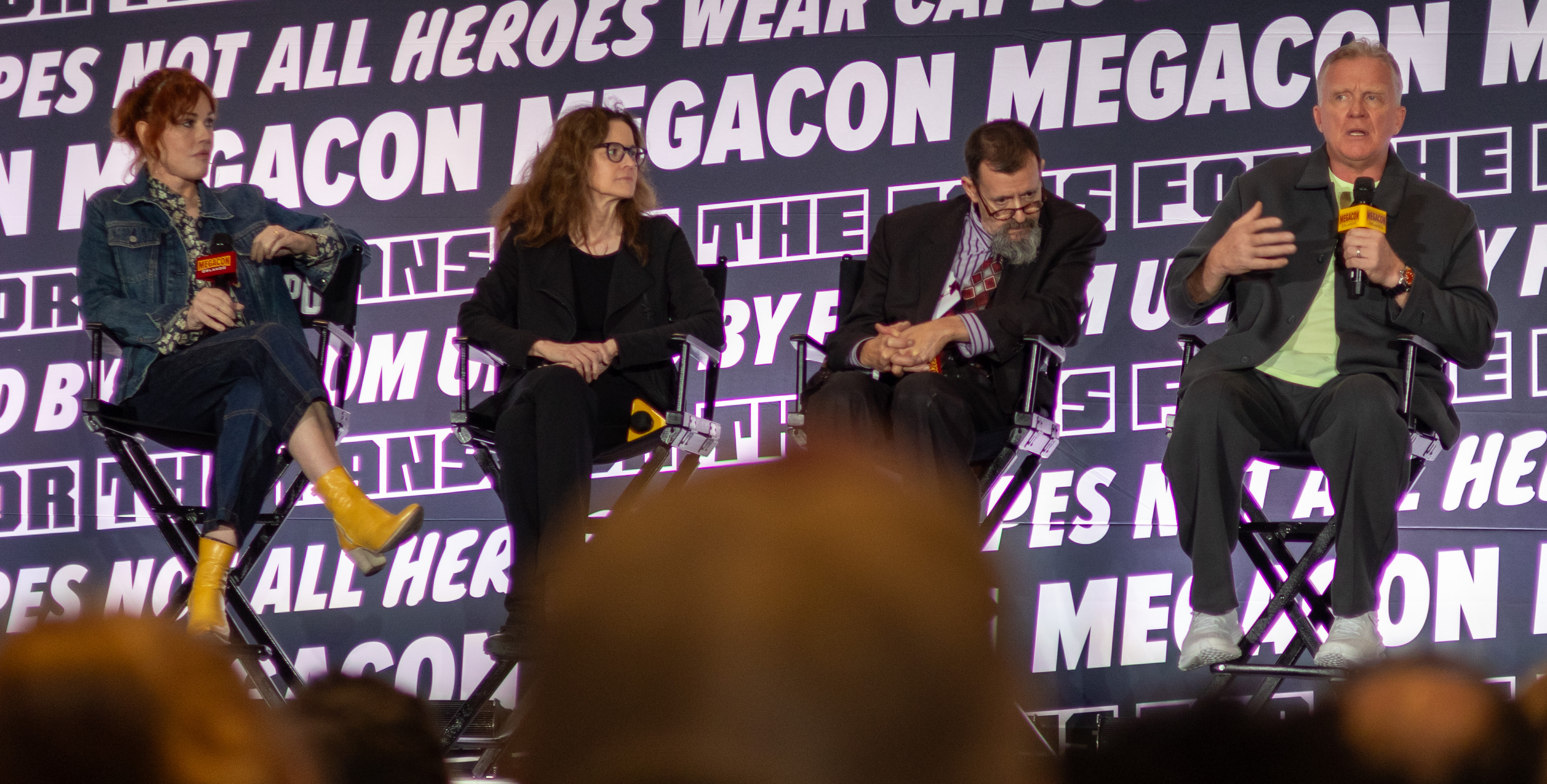
From left: Molly Ringwald, Ally Sheedy, Judd Nelson and Anthony Michael Hall in February 2025. All four actors are considered members of the Brat Pack.

Brat Pack is a nickname given to a group of young actors who frequently appeared together in teen-oriented coming-of-age films in the 1980s. The term Brat Pack, a play on Rat Pack from the 1950s and 1960s, was first popularized in a 1985 New York magazine cover story, which described a group of highly successful film stars in their early twenties. David Blum wrote the article after witnessing several young actors being mobbed by groupies at Los Angeles' Hard Rock Cafe. The group has been characterized by the partying of members such as Andrew McCarthy, Demi Moore, Emilio Estevez, Rob Lowe, Ally Sheedy, Molly Ringwald, Anthony Michael Hall, and Judd Nelson.

== Genesis of the name ==
David Blum's New York story, titled "Hollywood's Brat Pack", ran on June 10, 1985. It was originally supposed to be just about Emilio Estevez, but one night, Estevez invited Blum to hang out with him, Rob Lowe, Judd Nelson, and others at the Hard Rock Cafe. It was a typical night out for the group, who had gotten close while filming St. Elmo's Fire. That night, Blum decided to change the article's focus to an entire group of young actors at the time. The St. Elmo's Fire crew members did not like Blum and sensed that he was jealous of the actors' success.

Blum thought of the term the day after meeting the group, while thinking about a friend of his who was following Grace Jones to different restaurants and referred to his experience as following the "fat pack". At this instant, Blum felt like he was following the Brat Pack: "I wouldn’t call it an inspiration exactly. I did think it was pretty clever [...] these guys definitely fit the bill."

When the piece ran, the actors all felt betrayed, especially Estevez. The article mentioned people in several films but focused on Estevez, Lowe, and Nelson, and portrayed those three negatively. The Brat Pack label, which the actors disliked, stuck for years afterward. Before the article ran, they had been regarded as talented individuals; after the article, all of them were grouped together and regarded as unprofessional.

Some actors went on the Phil Donahue show and called Blum an "unethical jerk". During the show, Richard Schickel said "I really thought that was a scurrilous article.... I really think this is a kind of scuzz journalism.... I’ve been around journalism a long time. I look at a piece like that, and I say, this is really slob work, and he was out to get you." After the show, in the Chicago Sun-Times, Rob Lowe remarked that "He’s not Hunter Thompson or Tom Wolfe, he’s David Blum living in a cheap flat", and Sean Penn added "Sometimes writers, like actors, like anybody, do their work to impress three or four of their cool friends in SoHo".

With the increased negative attention to them, the actors soon stopped socializing with one another. On the group's camaraderie, Ally Sheedy later said the article "just destroyed it. I had felt truly a part of something, and that guy just blew it to pieces."

In 1987, Blum wrote an unapologetic article on the matter, stating "I do have one thing they don't. A job at a magazine. And that entitles me to the freedom of the press", and mentioning that he could not copyright the term Brat Pack even though he had also written an initial plot for a Brat Pack movie. According to Susannah Gora, Blum later admitted that he should not have written the article.

== Alleged members ==
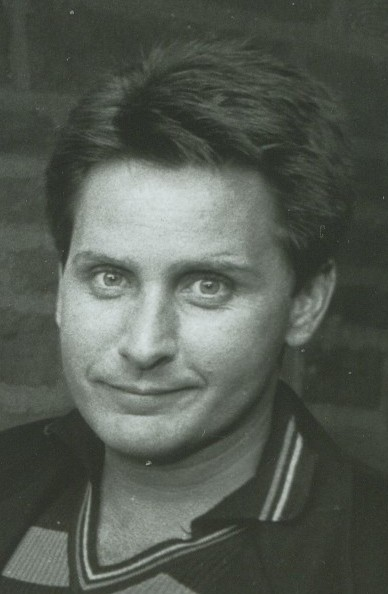
Emilio Estevez was identified by Blum as the "unofficial president" of the Brat Pack.

An appearance in one or both of the ensemble casts of two specific films released in 1985—John Hughes's The Breakfast Club and Joel Schumacher's St. Elmo's Fire—is often considered the prerequisite for being a core Brat Pack member. With this criterion, the most commonly cited members include:

- Emilio Estevez: Identified by Blum's original article as the "unofficial president" of the Brat Pack.
- Anthony Michael Hall
- Rob Lowe
- Andrew McCarthy
- Demi Moore
- Judd Nelson
- Molly Ringwald
- Ally Sheedy

After Brat Pack quickly became a common term to identify this young bunch of actors, other actors with similar films and traits were commonly associated with the made-up group:

- James Spader
- Robert Downey Jr.
- Jon Cryer
- John Cusack
- Joan Cusack
- Mare Winningham

The initial New York article covered a group of actors larger, or more inclusive, than the currently understood meaning of the term Brat Pack. While listed in the article as "official" members, they are loosely associated with the group's core members.

- Matthew Broderick
- Tom Cruise
- Timothy Hutton
- Matt Dillon
- Nicolas Cage
- Sean Penn
- Matthew Modine
- Charlie Sheen
- Kevin Bacon
- Kiefer Sutherland
- Julia Roberts
- Ralph Macchio

== Legacy ==
During the late 1980s, several of the Brat Pack actors had their careers mildly derailed by problems relating to drugs, alcohol, and in Lowe's case, a sex tape. According to Susannah Gora, "Many believe they could have gone on to more serious roles if not for that article. They were talented. But they had professional difficulties, personal difficulties after that." By the 21st century, the term Brat Pack had lost its negative connotation.

The films themselves have been described as representative of "the socially apathetic, cynical, money-possessed and ideologically barren eighties generation." They made frequent use of adolescent archetypes, were often set in the suburbs surrounding Chicago, and focused on middle-class teenage angst. According to author Susannah Gora, these films "changed the way many young people looked at everything from class distinction to friendship, from love to sex and fashion to music." They are considered "among the most influential pop cultural contributions of their time."

In 2012, Entertainment Weekly listed The Breakfast Club as the best high school movie ever made. On VH1's 2006 list of the 100 greatest teen stars, Molly Ringwald was ranked No. 1, Rob Lowe was ranked No. 2, Anthony Michael Hall was ranked No. 4, Ally Sheedy was ranked No. 34, and Andrew McCarthy was ranked No. 40.

In 2020, Estevez expressed frustration at the persistence of the Brat Pack name, saying "That [term] will be on my tombstone ... It's annoying because Brad Pitt, George Clooney and Matt Damon have worked together more than any of us have. We just made two movies and somehow it morphed into something else."

In June 2024, the documentary film Brats was released reflecting on the careers and lasting impact of the Brat Pack. Released by Hulu, the film was directed by and stars McCarthy, and features interviews with Estevez, Lowe, Moore, and Sheedy, as well as original article author David Blum and various frequent collaborators.

== Filmography ==
Beyond the two primary films, there is no generally accepted list of Brat Pack movies. While Blum's article credits Taps as the first Brat Pack movie, the list of movies below represents the more traditional filmography, with each movie including at least two core members in starring roles:

Movie	Actor								
Movie	Emilio Estevez	Anthony Michael Hall	Rob Lowe	Andrew McCarthy	Demi Moore	Judd Nelson	Molly Ringwald	Ally Sheedy	Close contributors
The Outsiders (1983)	Keith "Two-Bit" Mathews		Sodapop Patrick Curtis						Matt Dillon, Patrick Swayze, Tom Cruise, C. Thomas Howell, Ralph Macchio
Class (1983)			Franklin "Skip" Burroughs IV	Jonathan Ogner					John Cusack (played Roscoe Maibaum)
Sixteen Candles (1984)		"Farmer Ted" (credited as "the Geek")					Samantha Baker		John Cusack, Jami Gertz
Oxford Blues (1984)			Nick De Angelo					Rona	
The Breakfast Club (1985)	Andrew Clark	Brian Johnson				John Bender	Claire Standish	Allison Reynolds	
St. Elmo's Fire (1985)	Kirby Keager		Billy Hicks	Kevin Dolenz	Julianna "Jules" Van Patten	Alec Newbury		Leslie Hunter	Mare Winningham, Jenny Wright
Pretty in Pink (1986)				Blane McDonnagh			Andie Walsh		Jon Cryer, James Spader
Blue City (1986)						Billy Turner		Annie Rayford	
About Last Night... (1986)			Danny Martin		Debbie Sullivan				
Wisdom (1986)	John Wisdom				Karen Simmons				Charlie Sheen (uncredited cameo)
Fresh Horses (1988)				Matt Larkin			Jewel		
Betsy's Wedding (1990)							Betsy Hopper	Connie Hopper	

Other 1980s films, many with similar coming-of-age themes, that starred only one core Brat Pack actor with one or more close contributors include:

- Tex (1982) with Emilio Estevez and Matt Dillon
- WarGames (1983) with Ally Sheedy and Matthew Broderick
- Bad Boys (1983) with Ally Sheedy and Sean Penn
- Repo Man (1984) with Emilio Estevez and Olivia Barash
- No Small Affair (1984) with Demi Moore and Jon Cryer
- Heaven Help Us (1985) with Andrew McCarthy and Mary Stuart Masterson
- Weird Science (1985) with Anthony Michael Hall and Robert Downey Jr.
- One Crazy Summer (1986) with Demi Moore and John Cusack
- Out of Bounds (1986) with Anthony Michael Hall and Jenny Wright
- Youngblood (1986) with Rob Lowe and Patrick Swayze
- The Pick-up Artist (1987) with Molly Ringwald and Robert Downey Jr.
- Less than Zero (1987) with Andrew McCarthy, Jami Gertz, Robert Downey Jr., and James Spader
- Mannequin (1987) with Andrew McCarthy and James Spader
- Johnny Be Good (1988) with Anthony Michael Hall and Robert Downey Jr.
- Young Guns (1988) with Emilio Estevez, Charlie Sheen, and Kiefer Sutherland
- Kansas (1988) with Andrew McCarthy and Matt Dillon
- We're No Angels (1989) with Demi Moore and Sean Penn
- Young Guns II (1990) with Emilio Estevez and Kiefer Sutherland
- Bad Influence (1990) with Rob Lowe and James Spader

Some films have been dubbed Brat Pack movies despite having no stars from the core membership, including 1984's Red Dawn with C. Thomas Howell, Jennifer Grey, Charlie Sheen, Harry Dean Stanton, Patrick Swayze, and Lea Thompson, 1986's Ferris Bueller's Day Off which starred Matthew Broderick with Grey and Sheen in supporting roles and 1987's The Lost Boys with Kiefer Sutherland and Jami Gertz in key roles.

== Later acting careers ==
Many of the Brat Pack members have continued to act past the 1980s.

Photo	Name	Career
	Molly Ringwald	Continued acting in films throughout the 1990s; Performed as Sally Bowles in the Broadway revival of Cabaret (2001); Released the jazz record Except Sometimes (2013); Starred in television shows (The Secret Life of the American Teenager, Riverdale)
	Rob Lowe	Saw a massive career downturn following a 1988 sex tape scandal; His opening number at the 61st Academy Awards (1989) aggravated his image and career; Resurgence into television (The West Wing) followed by significant roles in various television shows (Brothers & Sisters (2006–2010), Parks and Recreation (2010–2014), 9-1-1: Lone Star (2020–2025)
	Emilio Estevez	Starred in several films (The Mighty Ducks trilogy); Career as a director
	Judd Nelson	Performed on three seasons of the show Suddenly Susan and Bad Kids Go to Hell.
	Ally Sheedy	Acted mostly in independent productions like Kyle XY; Taught at LaGuardia High School of Performing Arts
	Andrew McCarthy	Acted steadily in smaller TV and film roles; Later directed TV shows (Gossip Girl, The Blacklist, Orange Is the New Black); Joined the cast of The Resident in 2022; Released the 2024 documentary Brats chronicling the Brat Pack
	Anthony Michael Hall	Starred as Bill Gates in the 1999 television film Pirates of Silicon Valley; Starred in lead roles in TV series (The Dead Zone (2002–2007))
	Demi Moore	Starred in the blockbuster Ghost (1990); Leading roles in consecutive box office hits (A Few Good Men (1992), Indecent Proposal (1993), Disclosure (1994)); Became the highest paid actress by the mid-1990s; Other starring roles (The Scarlet Letter (1995), The Juror (1996), Striptease (1996), G.I. Jane (1997)) were widely panned and marked the end of her career as a leading actress; Oscar-nominated comeback performance in The Substance (2024)

== See also ==
- Brit Pack
- Child actor
- Dreamlanders
- Frat Pack
- Generation X
- Generation Jones
- Splat Pack
- Teen film
- Typecasting
