= Ned Tanen =

American film studio executive

Ned Stone Tanen (September 20, 1931 – January 5, 2009) was an American film studio executive. He produced some of the most popular films of the 1970s and 1980s, including the key Brat Pack films The Breakfast Club and St. Elmo's Fire, as well as Smokey and the Bandit, American Graffiti, Coal Miner's Daughter, The Deer Hunter, Crocodile Dundee, Top Gun, Animal House, and many others.

== History ==
Tanen was born to a Jewish family in Los Angeles and served in the United States Air Force after graduating from the University of California, Los Angeles. Following his military service, he got a job in 1954 in the MCA mailroom. He became an agent there in the late 1950s and in the early 1960s he was packaging TV shows for MCA/Universal after MCA acquired Universal Pictures. He helped form the Uni Records label at MCA in 1967. Artists recording on the Uni label included Neil Diamond, Elton John, Olivia Newton-John and the Strawberry Alarm Clock. Uni Records later merged with Decca Records to become MCA Records.

In 1970, Tanen became vice president of production at Universal Pictures, after serving as production supervisor on the 1971 Miloš Forman film Taking Off. He was named president of Universal's film division in 1976. His projects at Universal included a wide-ranging variety of box office and critical success, including the 1973 film American Graffiti, Jaws (1975), Smokey and the Bandit (1977), The Deer Hunter (1978), Melvin and Howard (1980) and Missing (1982). His 1980 films set an industry box office theatrical rentals record of $290 million, with releases including Coal Miner's Daughter, The Blues Brothers and Smokey and the Bandit II, and the record was surpassed in 1982 with the release of E.T. the Extra-Terrestrial taking the rentals to over $400 million. He resigned from Universal in December 1982.

In a 1978 article in The New York Times, Tanen described how some of the biggest box office grossing films take on a life of their own, describing the success of the film Animal House was a surprise, acknowledging that "All we did was make a picture about college fraternity life in the 1960s".

He had left Universal saying he wanted to leave "the Hollywood game" and established Channel Productions, but it was still based in Universal City and Universal had first choice on his productions. He produced the 1984 film Sixteen Candles and a pair of 1985 releases, The Breakfast Club and St. Elmo's Fire.

Following Michael Eisner's departure from Paramount Pictures to join The Walt Disney Company, Tanen joined Paramount in October 1984 as president of the studio's motion picture division under Frank Mancuso Sr. In his time at Paramount, the studio produced box office successes including the 1986 films "Crocodile" Dundee and Top Gun, and the 1987 releases Fatal Attraction and Beverly Hills Cop II, leading Paramount to post the top revenues among all studios in both 1986 and 1987. The studio's films in 1986 drew receipts of $600 million, more than twice its nearest competitor and setting an industry record at the time. Other films produced by Paramount during his time there include Ferris Bueller's Day Off (1986), Star Trek IV: The Voyage Home (1986), Children of a Lesser God (1986), The Untouchables (1987), and The Accused (1988). Tanen resigned in November 1988, with the responsibilities included in his position split between Sid Ganis and Barry London.

The character Biff Tannen in the Back to the Future films was named after Tanen. Writers Bob Gale and Robert Zemeckis had met with Tanen during a script meeting for I Wanna Hold Your Hand where Tanen had reacted in aggressive fashion to their writing, accusing them of attempting to produce an antisemitic film.

Tanen went back to independent film production after leaving Paramount, working on films such as Guarding Tess (1994), Cops & Robbersons (1994) and Mary Reilly (1996) with the latter of three for TriStar Pictures.

Tanen died at age 77 on January 5, 2009 in his home in Santa Monica, California.
