= Fresh Horses =

Fresh Horses may refer to:

- Fresh Horses (film), 1988 coming of age drama film
- Fresh Horses (album), 1995 album by Garth Brooks
- Fresh Horses, 2004 album by Jim Byrnes
