= The Autumn Heart =

- Directed by: Steven Maler
- Written by: Davidlee Willson
- Produced by: Kelley A. McMahon; Jerri Sher
- Starring: Tyne Daly; Ally Sheedy
- Cinematography: John Leuba
- Edited by: David Bigelow; Joel Hirsch
- Music by: Sheldon Mirowitz
- Release date: January 27, 1999 (Sundance)
- Running time: 110 minutes
- Country: United States
- Language: English

The Autumn Heart is a 1999 American drama film directed by Steven Maler and starring Tyne Daly and Ally Sheedy. It was screened at the 1999 Toronto International Film Festival, where it won the Golden Space Needle award for Best Canadian Feature Film. In 2000, it received the Association for Canadian Cinema and Television's David Cronenberg Award of Excellence for Maler's visual cinematography.

== Cast ==
- Tyne Daly as Ann
- Ally Sheedy as Deborah
- Jack Davidson as Lee
- Davidlee Willson as Daniel
- Marla Sucharetza as Diane
- Marceline Hugot as Donna
- Will Lyman as Doctor
