= Kindle single =

Type of e-book

A Kindle single is a type of e-book which is published through Amazon's Kindle Store. It is specifically intended as a format for novella-length nonfiction literature or long-form journalism. The name "single" comes from musical singles which are shorter in length than an extended play record.

The format, first released in January 2011, was welcomed by The New York Times' Virginia Heffernan in her final column for the paper, who commented that "I’m thrilled to find these Kindle Singles, which add narrative nonfiction to the forms I can savor out here. Narrative nonfiction in our digital era could exist almost no other way — and indeed, it once seemed headed for obsolescence. I’m extremely happy to see it back." The format has also been praised by literary critic Dwight Garner, who welcomed "what feels almost like a new genre: long enough for genuine complexity, short enough that you don't need journalistic starches and fillers."

The Atlantic writer Rebecca Rosen commented that authors of Kindle singles have found the platform to be financially beneficial. She made a point of distinguishing Kindle singles, which are "curated and shepherded through an editing process by former Village Voice editor-in-chief and Columbia adjunct David Blum, much like a traditional publishing house" ("successful Singles authors aren't undiscovered gems but professional writers who have published elsewhere before") from Kindle Direct Publishing, which is a platform for unknown authors to quickly publish and sell their works as e-books through Amazon.
