= Brats (2024 film) =

2024 documentary film by Andrew McCarthy

- Official release poster
- Directed by: Andrew McCarthy
- Produced by: Adrian Buitenhuis; Derik Murray
- Cinematography: Adrian Buitenhuis; Evans Brown
- Edited by: Tony Kent
- Production companies: ABC News Studios; Neon; Network Entertainment
- Distributed by: Hulu
- Release dates: June 7, 2024 (Tribeca); June 13, 2024 (United States)
- Running time: 92 minutes
- Country: United States
- Language: English

Brats is a 2024 documentary film, directed by Andrew McCarthy. It explores the Brat Pack, a group of young actors who frequently appeared together in coming-of-age films, and the impact on their lives and careers.

It had its world premiere at the Tribeca Festival on June 7, 2024, and was released on June 13, 2024, by Hulu.

== Premise ==
The film explores the Brat Pack, a group of young actors who frequently appeared together in coming-of-age films, and the impact on their lives and careers. Emilio Estevez, Ally Sheedy, Timothy Hutton, Demi Moore, Rob Lowe, Lea Thompson and Jon Cryer appear in the film, as do producer Lauren Shuler Donner, writer and director Howard Deutch, and David Blum, the journalist who coined the term "Brat Pack."

== Production ==
In January 2024, it was announced Andrew McCarthy had directed a documentary revolving around the Brat Pack, with ABC News Studios and Neon producing, and Hulu distributing. Molly Ringwald, Judd Nelson, and Anthony Michael Hall declined to be interviewed for the film.

== Release ==
It had its world premiere at the Tribeca Festival on June 7, 2024 and was released on June 13, 2024 by Hulu.

== Reception ==
On the review aggregator website Rotten Tomatoes, 85% of 65 critics' reviews are positive. The website's consensus reads: "An insightful overview of a bygone Hollywood era as well as a deeply personal journey for director Andrew McCarthy, Brats is a bittersweet reflection on childhood stardom." Metacritic, which uses a weighted average, assigned the film a score of 68 out of 100, based on 15 critics, indicating "generally favorable" reviews.
