= Fear (1990 film) =

- Film poster
- Directed by: Rockne S. O'Bannon
- Written by: Rockne S. O'Bannon
- Produced by: Richard Kobritz; Mitchell Cannold; Diane Nabatoff; Henry Kline
- Starring: Ally Sheedy; Lauren Hutton; Michael O'Keefe; Keone Young; Stan Shaw; Jonathan Prince
- Cinematography: Robert M. Stevens
- Edited by: Kent Beyda; Lorraine Salk
- Music by: Henry Mancini
- Distributed by: Vestron Pictures
- Release date: July 15, 1990
- Running time: 90 minutes
- Country: United States
- Language: English

Fear is a 1990 American thriller/horror/suspense film. It is directed by Rockne S. O'Bannon and stars Ally Sheedy, Pruitt Taylor Vince, Michael O'Keefe, Lauren Hutton, Keone Young, Stan Shaw, Dean Goodman, Don Hood and Jonathan Prince. Sheedy plays a psychic police consultant who discovers that the latest serial killer she is helping police track is also a psychic, one who takes sadistic pleasure in making her share in the fear his victims experience.

== Plot ==
Cayce Bridges is a psychic gifted in a form of psychometry, which she plies to kickstart her career as a novelist by serving as a consultant on homicide investigations, mentally linking with murderers in order to provide police with clues to their identities and whereabouts, and then writing nonfiction books about these experiences. The books make Cayce a minor celebrity with a glowing public image, but her manager and friend Jessica informs her that publishers are only interested in more books about her psychic investigations, even though Cayce is traumatized by mind linking with killers and wants out. Jessica can get her a deal for two novels, but only if she tackles one last case.

Cayce consults for Detectives Webber and Wu as they pursue the elusive "Shadow Man", whose calling card is the words "Fear me" written in blood. By tracing a victim's memories, she learns that the Shadow Man's motivation is a sadistic pleasure in making people afraid; he kills each victim with their greatest fear. At a dinner party hosted by Jessica, Cayce is telepathically contacted by the Shadow Man. He tells her he is glad to have found a fellow psychic who he can share his headspace with and mentally takes her along on his kill. Cayce tries to break contact and cannot, making her realize that the Shadow Man is much more practiced in his abilities than she is.

While on patrol with the police, the Shadow Man connects with Cayce. As she is describing the scene to Detective Webber he realizes that the killer is at his house and his children will be home soon. The Shadow Man explains to Cayce that his point is that he can get to anyone, and will kill those close to her if she continues working with the police.

To distance herself Cayce boards a flight to New York, enraging the Shadow Man. To teach her a lesson he suffocates Jessica to death, telling Cayce that if she tries to leave again he will kill one person every hour until she returns.

The Shadow Man's obsession with Cayce escalates, and he inundates her with romantic gifts. Afraid of more people being killed because of her actions, Cayce withdraws from the investigation and resigns herself to being a perpetual victim of the Shadow Man. Her next door neighbor Jack urges her to not let the Shadow Man have control of her life. Under his guidance she practices blocking the Shadow Man's telepathy. Cayce uses this to track the Shadow Man to a laundromat, but he narrowly escapes.

Jack points out that no one travels far to do laundry, so they drive around the area of the laundromat seeking psychic impressions. The Shadow Man follows Cayce and Jack. They flee to a carnival. Cayce and the Shadow Man find each other in a fun house mirror attraction called the "Chamber of Fear". Cayce realizes he was able to follow her because he read Jack's thoughts, not hers. After a struggle across the carnival the Shadow Man falls out of the Ferris wheel and dies. Cayce confesses to Jack that she has always said she would only become romantically involved with a man she could touch without reading his thoughts, but responds affirmatively to his unspoken desire for a dinner date with her.

== Cast ==
- Ally Sheedy as Cayce Bridges
- Michael O'Keefe as Jack Hays
- Lauren Hutton as Jessica Moreau
- Pruitt Taylor Vince as "Shadow Man"
- Keone Young as Detective William Wu
- Stan Shaw as Detective Webber
- Jonathan Prince as Colin Hart
- Dina Merrill as Catherine Tarr
- John Agar as Leonard Scott Levy
- Marta DuBois as Inez Villanueva
- Dean Goodman as William Tarr
- Don Hood as Holcomb
- Jane Sibbett as Newscaster

== Release ==
Originally intended for a theatrical release, the film made its premiere on Showtime on July 15, 1990.

== DVD ==
The film has been released on DVD by Lions Gate as a double feature with Parents. Both films are presented in widescreen.

== Critical reception ==
Writing in Radio Times, critic Alan Jones described the film as an "unusual thriller" with Sheedy displaying "an unexpected steely side," and that although there is "little in the way of mystery [...] there's plenty of unnerving action." Critic Rick Kogan wrote in The Chicago Tribune that the film was "interestingly textured and graced by a bold performance" from Sheedy, and that it "will keep you interested, offers an interesting variation on its theme and rarely dips into predictability." A review in the Sun Sentinel, reported that although the film is "billed as a psychological thriller, [it] is really a color-by-number, blood-and-guts crime story with a better-than-average gimmick."
