= Ally Sheedy =

American actress (born 1962)

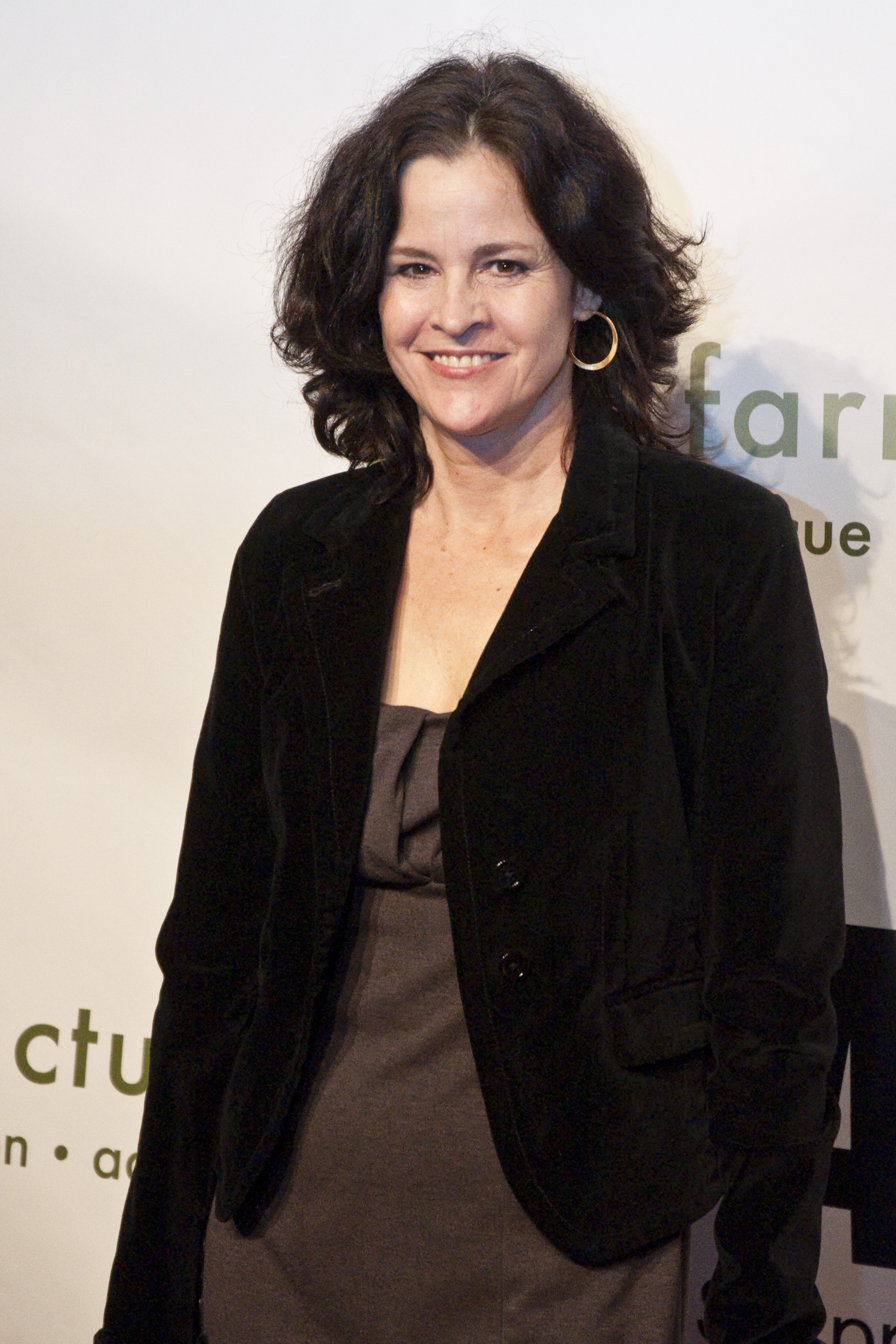
- Sheedy in 2011
- Born: Alexandra Elizabeth Sheedy; June 13, 1962 (age 64); New York City, New York, U.S.
- Occupations: Actress; author; teacher
- Years active: 1978–present
- Spouse: David Lansbury (m. 1992; div. 2009)
- Children: 1

Alexandra Elizabeth Sheedy (born June 13, 1962) is an American actress, author and teacher. Born in New York City, Sheedy began her career as a teenager acting in commercials and guest roles on television. She made her theatrical film debut in Bad Boys (1983). Due to her appearances in a string of teen-oriented films such as Oxford Blues (1984), The Breakfast Club (1985) and St. Elmo's Fire (1985), Sheedy and many of her co-stars were nicknamed the "Brat Pack".

She subsequently appeared in the films Twice in a Lifetime (1985), Blue City, Short Circuit (both 1986), Betsy's Wedding (1990) and Only the Lonely (1991). She received three Saturn Award nominations for Best Actress for the science fiction films WarGames (1983), Fear (1990) and Man's Best Friend (1993). Following a career downturn in the late 1980s, Sheedy won the Independent Spirit Award for Best Female Lead for playing a drug-addicted lesbian photographer in the romantic drama film High Art (1998). She had a main role in the comedy television series Single Drunk Female (2022–2023).

Sheedy also works as a literary editor and has authored two books, including the best-selling historical fiction novel She Was Nice to Mice (1975) which was published when she was aged 12. Since 2021, Sheedy has taught at the City College of New York.

== Early life ==
Alexandra Elizabeth Sheedy was born on June 13, 1962, in New York City, the eldest of three children of Charlotte (née Baum), a literary agent involved in women's and civil rights movements, and John Sheedy Jr., an advertising executive. Her mother is Ashkenazi Jewish, and her father has Irish Catholic ancestry. Sheedy's maternal grandmother emigrated from Odessa, Ukraine. Sheedy identifies as Jewish. Her parents divorced in 1971.

Sheedy was raised on the Upper West Side. She danced with American Ballet Theatre from the age of six, and well into adolescence. She attended the Bank Street School for Children, followed by Columbia Grammar & Preparatory School, graduating in 1980. In her senior year she directed a stage production of The Effect of Gamma Rays on Man-in-the-Moon Marigolds.

== Career ==
=== 1975–1980: She Was Nice to Mice ===
Sheedy's first literary piece was published in Ms. when she was twelve. She wrote freelance reviews of childrens' books for The New York Times, Ms. and The Village Voice. (Note: Attributed to multiple sources)

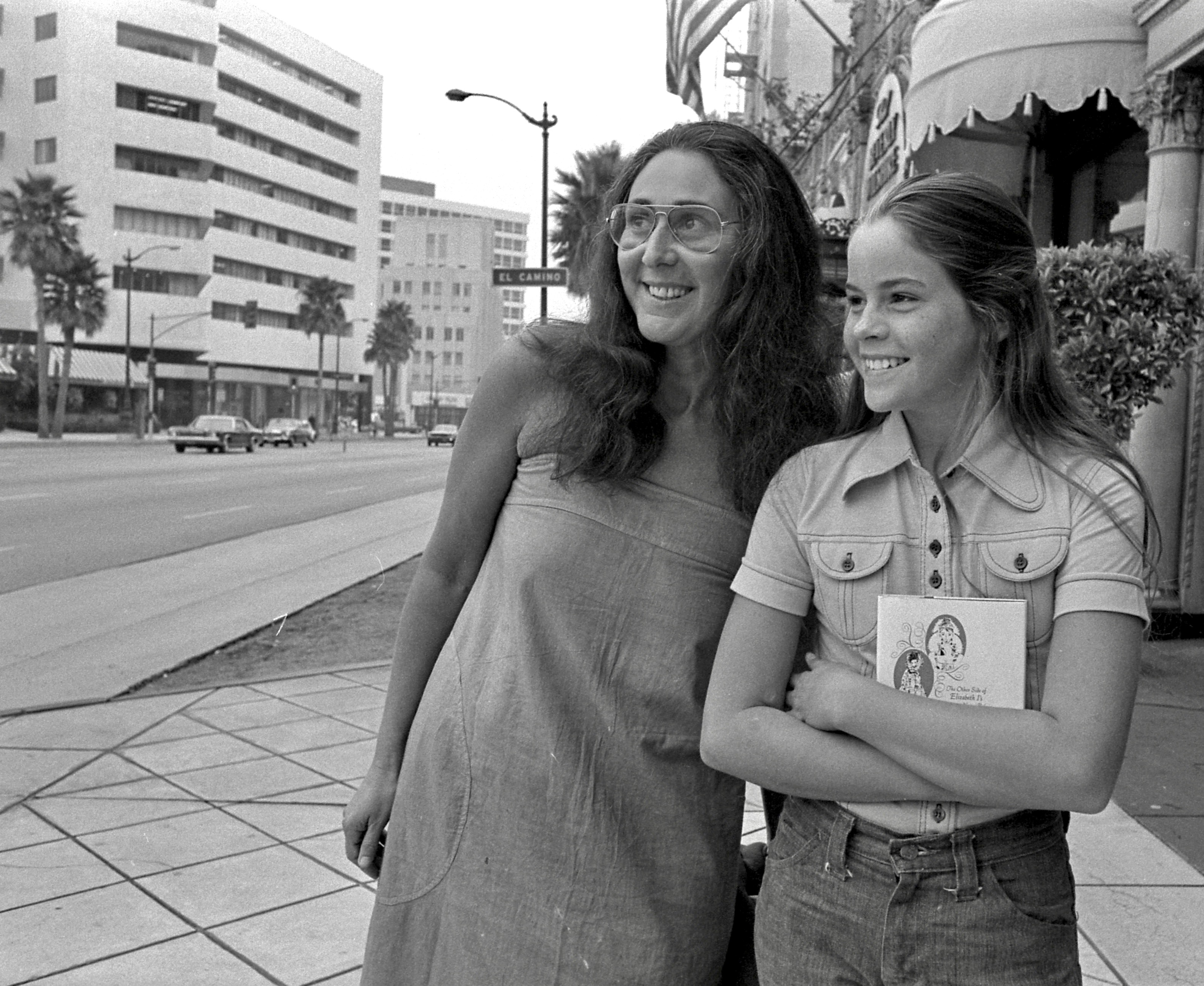
Sheedy and her mother, Charlotte, in Los Angeles, September 1975

Sheedy often wrote short stories in her youth. She enjoyed novels with animal protagonists such as Stuart Little (1945), and had an interest in the Tudors sparked by the film Anne of the Thousand Days (1969), which led to her writing a story about a mouse living at the court of Queen Elizabeth I. She read two chapters to her mother's friend, Joyce Johnson, who brought it to McGraw Hill Education as a possible project. In 1975, McGraw Hill published the story as a novel titled She Was Nice to Mice: The Other Side of Elizabeth I's Character Never Before Revealed by Previous Historians. (Note: Chapter 6 of She Was Nice to Mice was originally published in the August 1975 issue of Seventeen.) It was illustrated by Sheedy's friend Jessica Ann Levy. The novel was well-received and became a best-seller. (Note: Attributed to multiple sources)

Sheedy's novel landed her on the talk show The Tonight Show Starring Johnny Carson. An audiobook record, narrated by Sheedy, was released in 1976 on the Caedmon label. She earned enough royalties to put herself through college.

=== 1981–1986: Early career and Brat Pack ===
Sheedy began a career in acting, despite parental disapproval; she started acting in commercials at the age of 15. (Note: She appeared in commercials for Colgate and Tic Tac.) At age 18, she relocated to Los Angeles, where she enrolled at the University of Southern California. Sheedy concurrently began her acting career and intermittently completed three years' worth of courses toward a Bachelor of Fine Arts in drama. Sheedy subsequently appeared in the television movies The Best Little Girl in the World (1981) and The Violation of Sarah McDavid (1981), and in guest roles on the drama series Chicago Story (1982), St. Elsewhere (1982) and Hill Street Blues (1983).

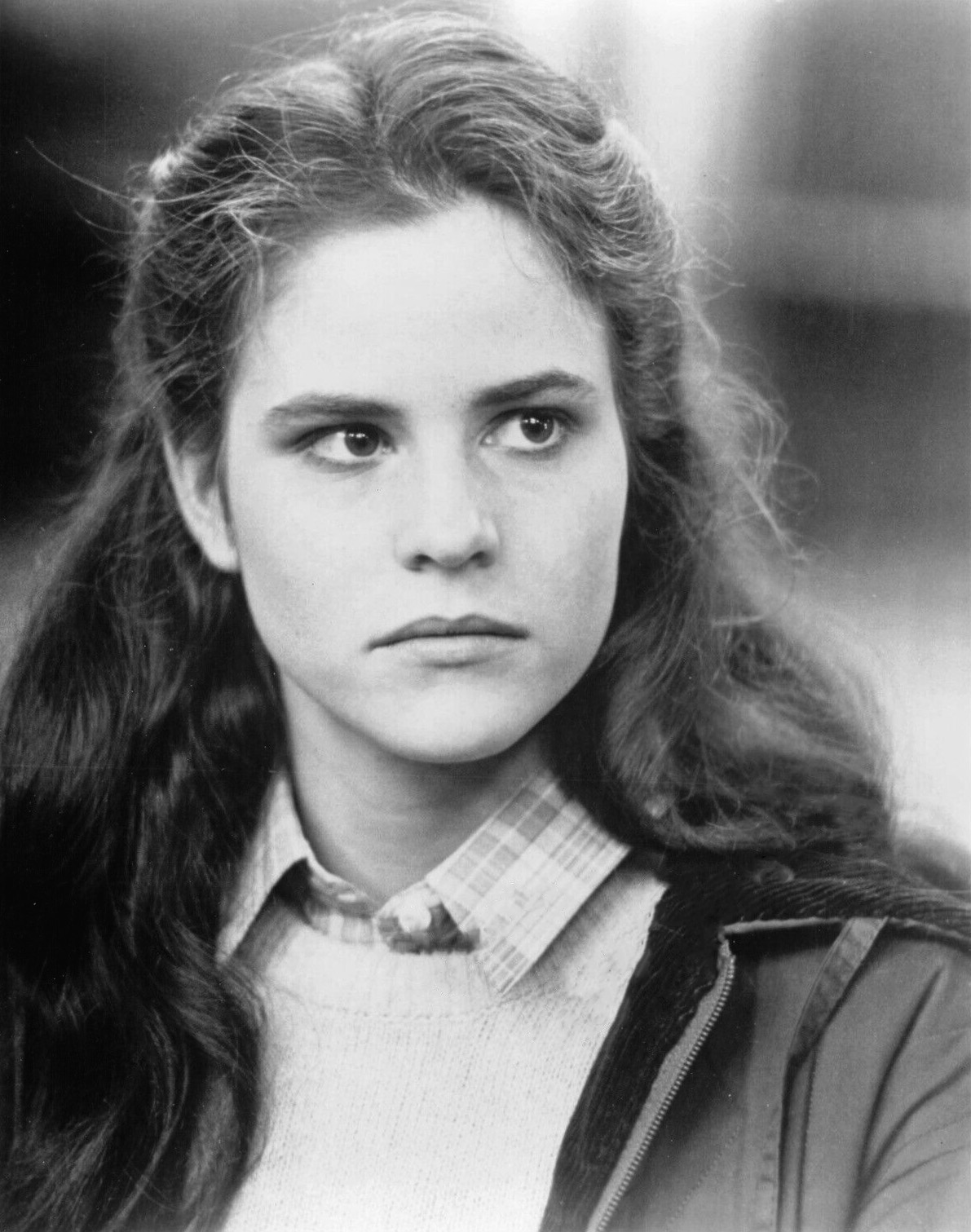
Sheedy in a 1982 press photo for Chicago Story

Sheedy rose to fame with a string of major film roles. She made her film acting debut in the crime drama film Bad Boys (1983), in which she played the girlfriend of Sean Penn's character. The same year, she starred alongside Matthew Broderick in the science fiction film WarGames, for which she was nominated for her first Saturn Award for Best Actress and for the Youth in Film Award for Best Young Actress Starring in a Motion Picture. She co-starred with Rob Lowe in Oxford Blues (1984).

In 1985, Sheedy became associated with the "Brat Pack", an informal group of young actors who frequently co-starred in teen-oriented films. Reporter David Blum used the term—a play on the "Rat Pack"—to refer to Sheedy's past co-stars Emilio Estevez, Rob Lowe and Judd Nelson in the New York article "Hollywood's Brat Pack", but the media subsequently included Sheedy along with actors Andrew McCarthy, Demi Moore, Molly Ringwald and Anthony Michael Hall. She starred alongside various Brat Pack members in The Breakfast Club and St. Elmo's Fire, both 1985 coming-of-age films with ensemble casts. Sheedy disliked the label, calling it in 1986 "snotty" and "condescending and sort of dismissive in a way", and said the article's publication caused the social group to splinter.

In Twice in a Lifetime (1985), Sheedy played the daughter of Gene Hackman's character. She appeared with Judd Nelson in Blue City (1986), which was poorly reviewed. Her first starring film role was in the science fiction comedy film Short Circuit (1986), in which her character Stephanie befriends an escaped robot. Sheedy noted that she became typecast in coming-of-age films.

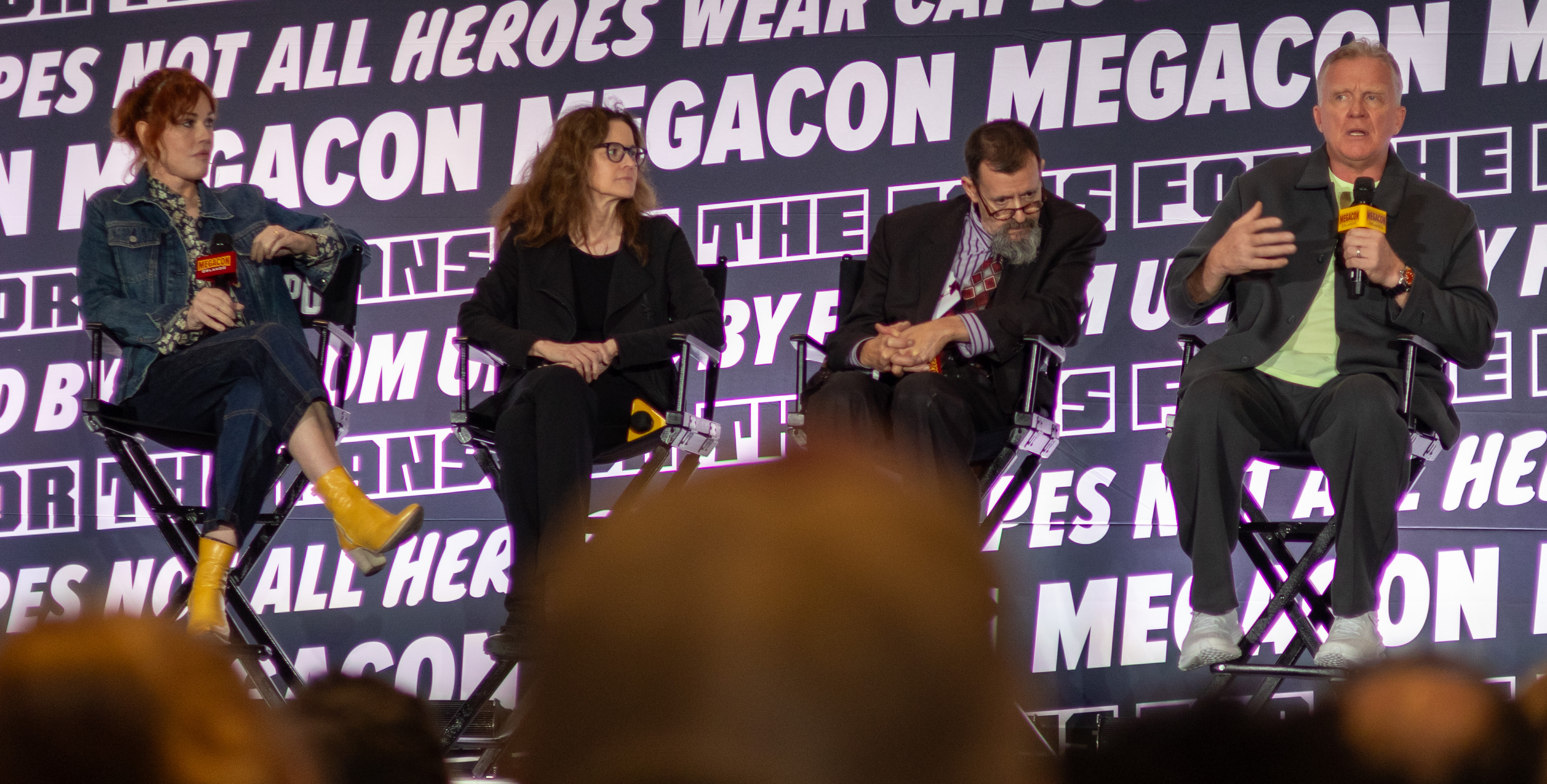
From left: Molly Ringwald, Sheedy, Judd Nelson and Anthony Michael Hall in February 2025. All four actors are considered members of the Brat Pack.

=== 1987–1998: Career downturn, High Art ===
Sheedy had lead roles in the films Maid to Order (1987) and Heart of Dixie (1989), both commercial flops. For her performances in Blue City and Heart of Dixie, Sheedy received two nominations for the Golden Raspberry Award for Worst Actress. Sheedy was told that her perceived lack of sex appeal was to blame for her stalling career, and she was encouraged by both her management team and film producers to alter her appearance and public persona. (Note: Attributed to multiple sources) Sheedy reflected in 1998 that "I did not do the things I was supposed to do to make myself into a movie star. Part of that is because it went against my ethics, and part of it was I realized at a certain point that being a movie star isn’t what I wanted to be."

Sheedy starred in the horror film Fear (1990) as a psychic. She also featured in the romantic comedy films Betsy's Wedding (1990) and Only the Lonely (1991); for the former, she was nominated for the Golden Raspberry Award for Worst Supporting Actress. Sheedy made a cameo appearance in Home Alone 2: Lost in New York (1992) as an airline attendant. Her performances in Fear and Man's Best Friend (1993) earned her two more Saturn Award nominations for Best Actress. Sheedy's book of poetry, Yesterday I Saw the Sun, was published by Summit Books in 1991. It was not critically well-reviewed. In 1997, Sheedy was fired by her talent agency William Morris. She returned to New York and spent a decade studying with acting teacher Harold Guskin. (Note: Attributed to multiple sources)

Sheedy starred in the independent romantic drama film High Art (1998) as Lucy Berliner, a drug-addicted lesbian photographer. Sheedy was actively searching for an "interesting" role such as Lucy, and flew to meet writer-director Lisa Cholodenko after reading High Art's script. Her performance was recognized with Best Female Lead at the 14th Independent Spirit Awards, as well as awards from the Los Angeles Film Critics Association and National Society of Film Critics. Critics noted that the role contrasted the "girl-next-door" image Sheedy cultivated in the early 80s. Sheedy stated in 2022 that High Art was her favourite film in her filmography. Film critic Guy Lodge, writing for The Guardian in 2024, called it her best performance.

=== 1999–present: later career ===
In September 1999, Sheedy took over the titular role in the off-Broadway production of the musical Hedwig and the Angry Inch. She was the first woman to play the part of the transsexual Hedwig, but her run ended two months early amid "mixed" reviews. That same year, she starred in the ensemble cast of the independent film Sugar Town. She also made a cameo appearance in the film adaptation of the play Advice from a Caterpillar, having starred in the show's 1991 off-Broadway production.

Sheedy in 2013

Sheedy was reunited with Breakfast Club co-star Anthony Michael Hall when she guest starred on the second season of the television series The Dead Zone (2003). Sheedy appeared in the television series C.S.I. (2007) and Kyle XY (2008). From 2009 to 2013, she played the role of serial killer Mr. Yang on the USA Network detective series Psych.

Sheedy portrayed a schoolteacher in the superhero film X-Men: Apocalypse (2016). She guest starred in the second season of the Showtime comedy series SMILF (2019). Sheedy played Carol Fink, a single mother to an alcoholic daughter, in the Freeform series Single Drunk Female (2022–2023). (Note: Attributed to multiple sources)

Sheedy became a volunteer teacher at LaGuardia High School for the Performing Arts. Since 2022, she has been a professor in the theater department at the City College of New York. Sheedy also edits books under a pseudonym, which has not been publicly revealed. In January 2026, it was announced that Sheedy had joined the City College of New York's first Film Advisory Board.

In 2026, Sheedy executive produced and portrayed Barbara Heisler in Madison Young's autobiographical drama film By the Roots. In September 2026, Rob Lowe stated that a sequel to St. Elmo's Fire with the original cast, including Sheedy, was "in the works".

== Personal life ==
Sheedy became a vegetarian at the age of 12. She struggled with bulimia since her time as a dancer. She also had an abortion at the age of 16.

In 1986 and 1987, Sheedy was in a relationship with musician Steve Ross. Around 1989, Sheedy dated Richie Sambora, Bon Jovi's guitarist, for less than a year. Sheedy stated in 1998 that the relationship led her to abuse Halcion, Xanax and antidepressants, a claim Sambora denied. Her dependency on Halcion was so severe that a group of friends persuaded her to seek rehabilitation at the Hazelden Foundation in Minneapolis. (Note: Attributed to multiple sources) Sheedy briefly dated Woody Harrelson in 1989.

Sheedy met actor David Lansbury, the nephew of actress Angela Lansbury and son of producer Edgar Lansbury, while working together in an off-Broadway play. They married in 1992, and divorced in 2008. The couple had a son, who is transgender.

Sheedy supports LGBT rights. In November 2012, she hosted a fundraiser for the Ali Forney Center—an LGBT community center that helps LGBT homeless youth—which raised funds to relocate and reopen the drop-in center.

In January 2018, Sheedy published three tweets which included the #MeToo hashtag along with comments referring to actors James Franco and Christian Slater. Media outlets assumed this meant the two actors had been sexually abusive to her. She later deleted the tweets.

== Awards and nominations ==
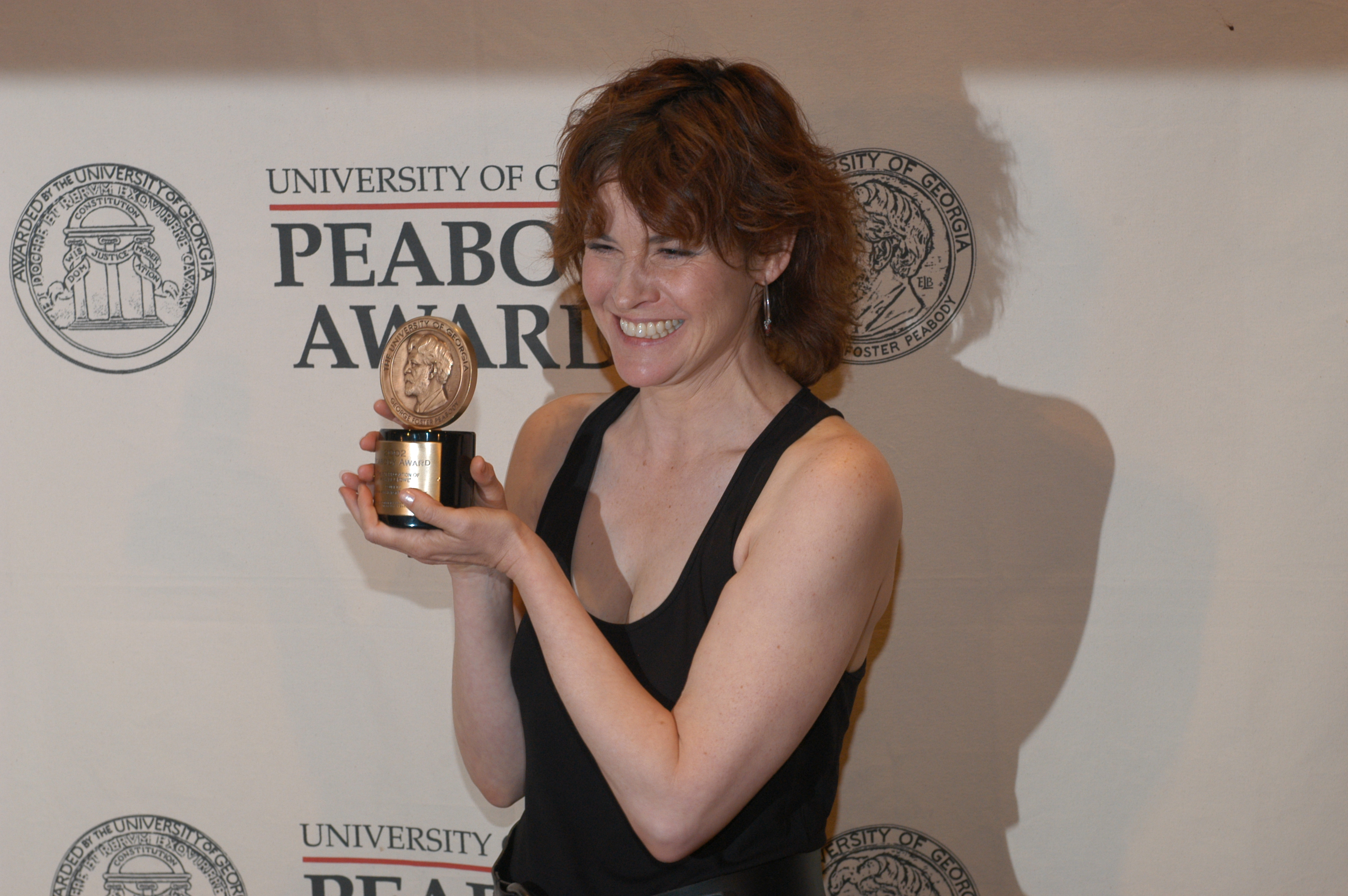
Sheedy in 2003 with a Peabody Award for The Interrogation of Michael Crowe.

=== Saturn Awards ===
Year	Category	Work	Result	Ref.
1984	Best Actress	WarGames	Nominated	
1991	Best Actress	Fear	Nominated	
1994	Best Actress	Man's Best Friend	Nominated	

=== Golden Raspberry Awards ===
Year	Category	Work	Result	Ref.
1987	Worst Actress	Blue City	Nominated	
1990	Worst Actress	Heart of Dixie	Nominated	
1991	Worst Supporting Actress	Betsy's Wedding	Nominated	

=== Other ===
Year	Association	Category	Work	Result	Ref.
1983	Youth in Film Award	Best Young Motion Picture Actress in a Feature Film	WarGames	Nominated	
1987	Jupiter Award	Best International Actress	Short Circuit	Nominated	
1998	Boston Society of Film Critics	Best Actress	High Art	Nominated	
1999	Los Angeles Film Critics Association	Best Actress (tied with Fernanda Montenegro for Central Station)	High Art	Won	
1999	Independent Spirit Awards	Best Female Lead	High Art	Won	
1999	National Society of Film Critics	Best Actress	High Art	Won	
1999	Chicago Film Critics Association	Best Actress	High Art	Nominated	
1999	Chlotrudis Society for Independent Films	Best Actress	High Art	Nominated	
2005	MTV Movie Awards	Silver Bucket of Excellence Award (accepted by Sheedy, Molly Ringwald, Judd Nelson and Anthony Michael Hall)	The Breakfast Club	Won	
2010	Gotham Independent Film Awards	Best Ensemble Performance	Life During Wartime	Nominated	

== Published books ==
- She Was Nice to Mice, McGraw-Hill, 1975, ISBN 0-440-47844-8
- Yesterday I Saw the Sun: Poems, Summit Books, 1991, ISBN 0-671-73130-0
