= Andrew McCarthy =

American actor (born 1962)

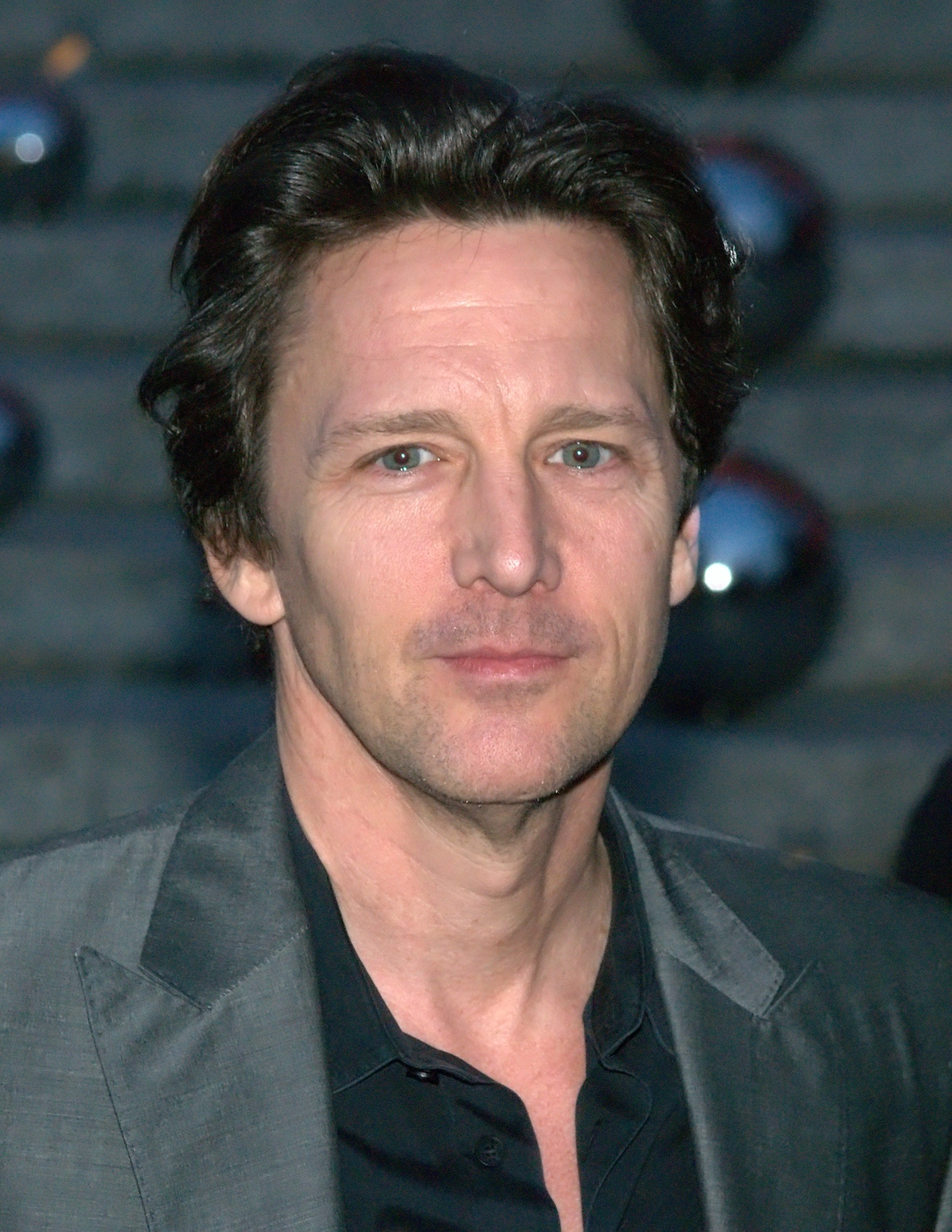
- McCarthy in 2010
- Born: Andrew Thomas McCarthy; November 29, 1962 (age 63); Westfield, New Jersey, U.S.
- Education: New York University (withdrawn)
- Occupations: Actor; travel writer; television director
- Years active: 1983–present
- Spouses: Carol Schneider (m. 1999; div. 2005) Dolores Rice (m. 2011)
- Children: 3, including Sam McCarthy
- Website: andrewmccarthy.com

Andrew Thomas McCarthy (born November 29, 1962) is an American actor, travel writer, television director, and author. He is most known as a member of the Brat Pack, with roles in 1980s films such as St. Elmo's Fire (1985), Pretty in Pink (1986), Mannequin (1987), and Weekend at Bernie's (1989). He is also known for his supporting role in the film The Joy Luck Club (1993). He is ranked No. 40 on VH1's 100 Greatest Teen Stars of all time list. As a director, he is known for his work on Orange Is the New Black.

== Early life and education ==
McCarthy was born in Westfield, New Jersey, the third of four boys. His mother worked for a newspaper, and his father was involved in investments and stocks. McCarthy moved to Bernardsville, New Jersey, as a teenager and attended Bernards High School and the Pingry School, a preparatory academy. At Pingry, he played the Artful Dodger in Oliver!, his first acting role. After graduating from high school, he enrolled at NYU for acting, but was expelled after two years.

== Career ==
McCarthy's first major role was in the 1983 comedy Class opposite Jacqueline Bisset. He was a member of the 1980s Hollywood group of young actors dubbed by the media as the "Brat Pack". The group starred in a few films, among them St. Elmo's Fire and Pretty in Pink. McCarthy appeared in the 1987 films Mannequin and Less than Zero, a cinematic adaptation of Bret Easton Ellis's novel. In 1985, McCarthy starred with Donald Sutherland and Kevin Dillon in Heaven Help Us (also known as Catholic Boys) as Michael Dunn. McCarthy made his Broadway debut in The Boys of Winter. He quickly returned to Hollywood in 1988 to star in several films, such as Fresh Horses and Kansas. He had another hit with the 1989 comedy film Weekend at Bernie's.

He returned to Broadway to star in Side Man, and the production won the 1999 Tony Award for Best Play. In 2003, McCarthy was set to guest star in two episodes of Law & Order: Criminal Intent. Due to bad relations with actor Vincent D'Onofrio, series creator Dick Wolf decided against it. Wolf later stated, "Mr. McCarthy engaged in fractious behavior from the moment he walked on the set." McCarthy fired back in a statement of his own saying, "I was fired because I refused to allow a fellow actor to threaten me with physical violence, bully me and try to direct me." Despite this incident, he later guest starred in a 2007 episode of Law & Order: Criminal Intent (with Chris Noth, not D'Onofrio). In 2004, he played Dr. Hook in Kingdom Hospital. He appeared in five episodes of the 2005 NBC television series E-Ring. In 2008, he starred in the NBC television series Lipstick Jungle as billionaire Joe Bennett and had a minor role in The Spiderwick Chronicles.

McCarthy directed several episodes of the hit CW television series Gossip Girl, including "Touch of Eva" in the fourth season. In 2010 and 2011, he appeared in the hit USA show White Collar. He returned to the series in the next season to direct the episode "Neighborhood Watch". In 2015, he directed three episodes in Season 2 of the NBC hit television show The Blacklist starring James Spader and Megan Boone. In 2016, he starred in the short-lived ABC drama The Family. From 2020 to 2021, he had a recurring role in NBC's TV series Good Girls. In 2022, McCarthy joined the cast of The Resident as Ian Sullivan, a renowned pediatric surgeon and Cade's estranged father.

== Writing ==
McCarthy began travel writing and served as an Editor at Large at National Geographic Traveler magazine. In 2010, McCarthy was escorted out of an underground church in Lalibela, Ethiopia, for entering the site without documentation. He had been in the church on assignment for the travel magazine Afar. McCarthy's book The Longest Way Home: One Man's Quest for the Courage to Settle Down was published in 2012.

In February 2015, National Geographic published McCarthy's account, titled "A Song for Ireland", of his return to the house in the townland of Lacka West in the parish of Duagh in County Kerry in Ireland from which his great-grandfather John McCarthy had emigrated in the late 1800s.

McCarthy has received several awards from SATW (Society of American Travel Writers), including Travel Journalist of the Year in 2010.

In 2017, Algonquin Books published McCarthy's YA novel, Just Fly Away. The novel became a New York Times bestseller.

McCarthy's memoir about his life and career in the 1980s, titled Brat: An '80s Story, was released in May 2021 by Grand Central Publishing.

In 2023, Grand Central Publishing released Walking with Sam: A Father, a Son, and Five Hundred Miles Across Spain, McCarthy's memoir about walking the Camino de Santiago with his son Sam in the summer of 2021.

In March 2026, McCarthy published Who Needs Friends? An Unscientific Examination of Male Friendship across America, which he presents as an effective antidote to toxic masculinity and the manosphere.

== Personal life ==
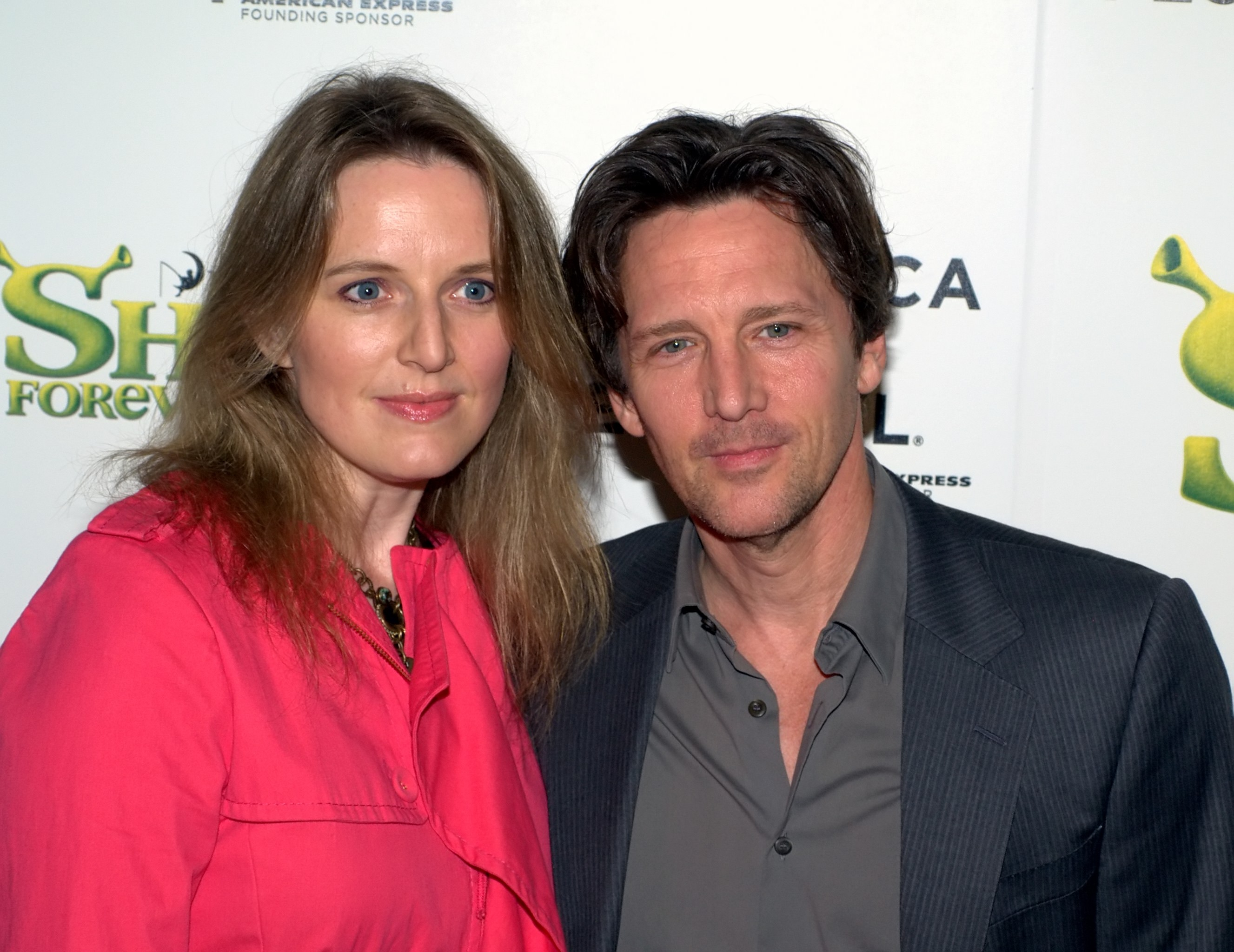
McCarthy with wife Dolores Rice at the premiere of Shrek Forever After, 2010

In 2004, McCarthy announced that he once had a serious alcohol problem, which began at age 12. He entered a detoxification program in 1992, and has been sober since that time.

McCarthy was married to actree Carole Schneider from 1999 to 2005. Their son Sam McCarthy is also an actor.

On August 28, 2011, McCarthy married Irish writer and director Dolores Rice. They have two children, Willow and Rowan.

== Filmography ==
=== Film ===
Year	Title	Role	Notes
1983	Class	Jonathan Ogner	
1984	The Beniker Gang	Arthur Beniker	
1985	Heaven Help Us	Michael Dunn	a.k.a. Catholic Boys
1985	St. Elmo's Fire	Kevin Dolenz	
1986	Pretty in Pink	Blane McDonnagh	
1987	Mannequin	Jonathan Switcher	
1987	Waiting for the Moon	Henry Hopper	
1987	Less than Zero	Clay Easton	
1988	Kansas	Wade Corey	
1988	Fresh Horses	Matt Larkin	
1989	Weekend at Bernie's	Larry Wilson	
1990	Quiet Days in Clichy	Henry Miller	a.k.a. Jours tranquilles à Clichy
1990	Dr. M	The Assassin	
1991	Year of the Gun	David Raybourne	
1992	Only You	Clifford Godfrey	
1993	Weekend at Bernie's II	Larry Wilson	
1993	The Joy Luck Club	Ted Jordan	
1994	Getting In	Rupert Grimm	a.k.a. Student Body
1994	Dead Funny	Reggie Barker	
1994	Mrs. Parker and the Vicious Circle	Eddie Parker	
1995	Night of the Running Man	Jerry Logan	Direct-to-video release
1995	Dream Man	David Mander	Direct-to-video release
1996	Mulholland Falls	Jimmy Fields	
1996	Everything Relative	Howard	
1996	Things I Never Told You	Don Henderson	a.k.a. Cosas que nunca te dije
1997	Stag	Peter Weber	
1998	Bela Donna	Frank	
1998	I Woke Up Early the Day I Died	Cemetery Cop	
1998	I'm Losing You	Bertie Krohn	
1999	A Twist of Faith	Henry Smith	
1999	New World Disorder	Kurt Bishop	
1999	New Waterford Girl	Cecil Sweeney	
2000	Nowhere in Sight	Eric Shelton	
2001	Heaven Must Wait	Raymond Cane	
2002	Anything But Love	Elliot Shephard	a.k.a. Standard Time
2004	2BPerfectlyHonest	Josh	
2004	News for the Church	—N/a	Director, writer; short film
2005	The Orphan King	Charles King	
2008	The Spiderwick Chronicles	Richard Grace	
2009	The Good Guy	Cash	
2009	Camp Hell	Michael Leary	
2010	Main Street	Howard Mercer	
2011	The Brooklyn Brothers Beat the Best	Brian	
2011	Snatched	Frank Baum	
2019	Finding Julia	Mike Chamonix	
2024	Brats	—N/a	Director; documentary

=== Television ===
Year	Title	Role	Notes
1986	Amazing Stories	Edwin	Episode: "Grandpa's Ghost"
1991	Tales from the Crypt	Edward Foster	Episode: "Loved to Death"
1992	Screen Two	Martin Musgrove	Episode: "Common Pursuit"
1995	The Courtyard	Jonathan Hoffman	Television film
1996	Escape Clause	Richard Ramsay	Television film
1996	Hostile Force	Rabbit (Mike)	Television film
1996	The Christmas Tree	Richard Reilly	Television film
1998	A Father for Brittany	Keith Lussier	Television film (a.k.a. A Change of Heart)
1998	Perfect Assassins	Ben Carroway	Television film
2000	A Storm in Summer	Stanley Banner	Television film
2000	Law & Order: Special Victims Unit	Randolph Morrow	Episode: "Slaves"
2000	The Sight	Michael Lewis	Television film
2000	Jackie Bouvier Kennedy Onassis	Robert F. Kennedy	Television film
2002	Georgetown		Television pilot
2002	The Secret Life of Zoey	Mike Harper	Television film
2003	Straight from the Heart	Tyler Ross	Television film
2003	Law & Order	Attorney Finnerty	Episode: "Absentia"
2003	The Twilight Zone	Will Marshall	Episode: "The Monsters Are on Maple Street"
2003	Monk	Derek Philby	Episode: "Mr. Monk Goes Back to School"
2004	Kingdom Hospital	Dr. Hook	Miniseries
2004	The Hollywood Mom's Mystery	Kit Freers	Television film
2005	Crusader	Hank Robinson	Television film
2005	E-Ring	Aaron Gerrity	5 episodes
2006	The Way	Henry Warden	Television pilot
2007	Law & Order: Criminal Intent	A.D.A. Gene Hoyle	Episode: "Offense"
2008–2009	Lipstick Jungle	Joe Bennett; Director	20 episodes
2009	Gossip Girl	Rick Rhodes	Episode: "Valley Girls"
2009	Royal Pains	Marshall David Bryant IV	2 episodes
2009	The National Tree	Corey Burdoc	Television film
2010–2012	Gossip Girl	Director	6 episodes
2011	White Collar	Vincent Adler	2 episodes
2012	A Christmas Dance	Jack	Television film (a.k.a. Come Dance with Me)
2013–2019	Orange Is the New Black	Director	15 episodes
2013–2014	Alpha House	Director	4 episodes
2015–2017	Turn: Washington's Spies	Director	3 episodes
2015–2022	The Blacklist	Director	22 episodes
2016	The Family	Hank Asher	12 episodes
2017	The Blacklist: Redemption	Director	Episode: "Hostages"
2018	Nightflyers	Director	2 episodes
2018	New Amsterdam	Director	Episode: "As Long as it Takes"
2018–2020	Condor	Director	5 episodes
2019	The Enemy Within	Director	Episode: "Sequestered"
2019–2020	Good Girls	Director	Episode: "Jeff"/"Au Jus"/"Vegas Baby"
2020–2021	Good Girls	Mr. Fitzpatrick	5 Episodes
2020	The Sinner	Director	2 episodes
2020	13 Reasons Why	Mr. St. George	Episode: Prom
2022–2023	The Resident	Ian Sullivan	Guest (season 5); Main cast (season 6)
2023	The Blacklist	Edward	Episode: Arthur Hudson

== Awards and nominations ==
Fantafestival

- 1987: Won, "Best Actor" – Mannequin

Rhode Island International Film Festival

- 2004: Won, Grand Prize for "Best Short Film" – News for the Church – qualifying it as an Official Entry with the Academy Awards for Best Live Action Short Film

Full Info Including Original Motion Picture Soundtrack CD produced by Al Gomes and A. Michelle of Big Noise

Sedona International Film Festival

- 2005: Won, "Best Short Film" – News for the Church
