= Advice from a Caterpillar =

1999 film directed by Don Scardino

- Directed by: Don Scardino
- Written by: Douglas Carter Beane (play and screenplay)
- Produced by: Jana Edelbaum
- Release date: 1999
- Country: United States
- Language: English

Advice from a Caterpillar is a 1999 independent drama film directed by Don Scardino and adapted by Douglas Carter Beane from his play of the same name. The title is derived from chapter five of the classic children's novel Alice's Adventures in Wonderland, by Lewis Carroll.

== Premise ==
Nixon plays a video artist with an aversion to commitment. She nonetheless falls for a bisexual actor (Olyphant) who is involved with her best friend (Dick).

== Cast ==
- Cynthia Nixon as Missy
- Timothy Olyphant as Brat
- Andy Dick as Spaz
- Ally Sheedy as Jan
- Jon Tenney as Suit
