= Class (film) =

1983 film by Lewis John Carlino

- Theatrical release poster by John Solie
- Directed by: Lewis John Carlino
- Written by: Jim Kouf; David Greenwalt
- Produced by: Martin Ransohoff
- Starring: Rob Lowe; Jacqueline Bisset; Andrew McCarthy; Cliff Robertson
- Cinematography: Ric Waite
- Edited by: Stuart H. Pappé
- Music by: Elmer Bernstein
- Production company: Orion Pictures
- Distributed by: Orion Pictures
- Release date: July 22, 1983 (United States)
- Running time: 98 minutes
- Country: United States
- Language: English
- Budget: $7 million
- Box office: $21.6 million

Class is a 1983 American comedy drama film directed by Lewis John Carlino, starring Rob Lowe, Jacqueline Bisset, Andrew McCarthy, and Cliff Robertson. In addition to being Lowe's second film (released four months after The Outsiders), it marked the film debuts of McCarthy, John Cusack, Virginia Madsen, Casey Siemaszko, and Lolita Davidovich.

== Plot ==
Upon first arriving at Vernon Academy, a prestigious boys' preparatory school in Illinois, Jonathan Ogner is mocked for wearing his school uniform. Then, going up to his dormitory, he meets his roommate, who introduces himself as Squire Franklin Burroughs IV but tells him to call him "Skip". Skip then takes off his bathrobe, revealing a red bra and panties, then explains to the shocked Jonathan that it is tradition for seniors to parade around campus wearing only girls' underwear.

Jonathan does not have any, so Skip gives him a set from his dresser. They head out of the dormitory together until they get to the final door where Skip stays behind and locks the door. The other students laugh and mock Jonathan for wearing girls' underwear. Mortified, Jonathan tries to get back inside. After discovering all the doors are locked, he climbs a trellis leading into his room where he finds Skip rolling on the floor laughing.

Skip tries to tell Jonathan it was a practical joke and to laugh it off, but Jonathan is too embarrassed. Later, during lunchtime in the cafeteria, the other students again taunt Jonathan as he tries to eat. When Skip invites him over to his table to sit with him and his friends, Jonathan turns to reveal that he is crying. Skip is now deeply remorseful for pulling the prank on Jonathan as he flees the cafeteria.

When Skip returns to their room to apologize to Jonathan, he finds him hanging with a rope around his neck in an apparent suicide. Going to get help, on his return to the room, Skip and the gathering crowd find not Jonathan but a mannequin with a picture of the dean's face attached to its head. The crowd crack up hysterically at Skip as the dean says he wants to see him and Jonathan in his office. As the crowd disperses, Skip finds Jonathan alive and laughing hysterically in the closet. He grudgingly accepts the prank reversal and they become fast friends. Afterwards, they share secrets, and Jonathan confesses he cheated on the SAT.

After several failed attempts to find Jonathan a date, Skip vows to help him have a successful sexual encounter. He sends Jonathan to a club in Chicago to gain sexual experience before their reputations are ruined. He is picked up by Ellen, a beautiful older woman, and begins an affair with her. He falls in love with her, although she considers it to be just a fling. Jonathan lied about his age, claiming to be a Ph.D. student. When he proclaims his love to Ellen during one of their trysts, she has second thoughts about continuing. Her decision is finalized when she discovers Jonathan is both much younger than he had claimed (only 17) and that he also attends the same school as her son.

Over Christmas break, Skip invites Jonathan to spend Christmas with him and his family at the Burroughs estate. There, Jonathan discovers that Ellen is Skip's mother and is married. He tries to end the affair, but she contacts him several times. Eventually, he agrees to meet to talk. Lying to Skip, he claims to need time alone. When Jonathan and Ellen meet in a hotel room in Chicago, they have sex again. Attempting to cheer up his friend, Skip and friends burst into the hotel room and discover Jonathan in bed with Skip's mother, upsetting Skip. Back at Vernon, the friends have a fist fight, but eventually reconcile.

== Cast ==
- Rob Lowe as Squire Franklin "Skip" Burroughs IV
- Jacqueline Bisset as Ellen Burroughs
- Andrew McCarthy as Jonathan Ogner
- Stuart Margolin as Balaban
- Cliff Robertson as Mr. Burroughs
- John Cusack as Roscoe Maybaum
- Rodney Pearson as Allen
- Alan Ruck as Roger Jackson
- Remak Ramsey as Kennedy
- Casey Siemaszko as Doug
- Aaron Douglas as Barry
- Virginia Madsen as Lisa
- Joan Cusack as Julia

== Production ==
Principal photography for the film took place in Chicago and the surrounding area between September and November 1982. Suffield House, a private mansion in Lake Forest, played the part of Skip Burroughs' family estate, given the fictitious address of 65 Spring Creek Road, Barrington Hills. Lake Forest College was used for numerous scenes; including the hockey scenes, the exterior dorm scenes, and, most notably, the lunchroom scenes.

Bisset replaced Lesley Ann Warren for the role of Ellen Burroughs. Bisset was disappointed that scenes involving her character's backstory were cut. These included a scene at the end where her son visited her in a mental hospital. "When you're in a comedy ... It's always difficult to develop a character because they always cut for comedy, the comic effect. I lost a couple of scenes that would have explained my character better. She was more interesting in the original script. Why does she do what she does? She's a very unhappy woman. She doesn't have any relationship at home. Cliff tells her in the bedroom that she's a Burroughs and as long as she's a Burroughs she must behave. That's not much of a relationship to have with your husband. So she's a bit off balance, greatly in need of a childlike component in her life. She's been completely buckled down by Cliff. There's absolutely no fantasy aspect to her life. She's condemned to being an adult... The director sees it much more as a rites-of-passage film", Bisset said.

McCarthy attended an open call held at New York University and wound up with the lead part in the film.

Lowe said, "It was a very atypical role for me. So it's a little uncomfortable when I'm too readily associated with it. 'Oh yeah, him, he was in Class.' It was such an extroverted role, and most of my work has been just the opposite. I like the movie. I think it was fun, not the vile concoction a lot of people seem to think it was."

Madsen dislikes talking about her experience making the film, stating in a 2013 interview, "Those guys were assholes. They were really shitty to me. It was bad. Bad memories." Rob Lowe said her comment was justifiable, pointing out "her big part in that movie required her shirt to get ripped off, and looking back, it couldn't be a more egregious, vintage, lowbrow, 1980s Porky's-esque, shoehorned-in moment... I can imagine it was not much fun to do that big sequence with a bunch of laughing, ogling frat-boy actors. I mean, can you imagine putting up with me, [John] Cusack, Alan Ruck, and Andrew McCarthy at 18?"

== Reception ==
On Rotten Tomatoes the film has a 29% rating based on reviews from 14 critics.

Variety said "Class is anything but classy....[It] seems something like an unofficial remake of one of Bisset's first Hollywood efforts, the 1969 The First Time".

Vincent Canby wrote "The movie can't make up its mind whether it's a lighthearted comedy, set in what appears to be a posh New England–style prep school just outside Chicago, or a romantic drama about a teen-age boy who has a torrid affair with his roommate's mother. Either way it's pretty awful."

Roger Ebert gave the film 2 out of 4 stars and said it was a "prep-school retread of The Graduate that knows some of its scenes are funny and some are serious, but never figures out quite how they should go together;" the film is "entertaining when it's not dealing with its real subject matter, painful when it is, and agonizing when it confuses rigid mortification with humor."
