= The Breakfast Club =

1985 film by John Hughes

- Theatrical release poster by Annie Leibovitz
- Directed by: John Hughes
- Written by: John Hughes
- Produced by: Ned Tanen; John Hughes
- Starring: Emilio Estevez; Paul Gleason; Anthony Michael Hall; Judd Nelson; Molly Ringwald; Ally Sheedy
- Cinematography: Thomas Del Ruth
- Edited by: Dede Allen
- Music by: Keith Forsey
- Production companies: Universal Pictures; A&M Films; Channel Productions
- Distributed by: Universal Pictures
- Release dates: February 7, 1985 (Los Angeles); February 15, 1985 (United States)
- Running time: 97 minutes
- Country: United States
- Language: English
- Budget: $1 million
- Box office: $52.1 million

The Breakfast Club is a 1985 American coming-of-age comedy-drama film written, produced, and directed by John Hughes. It stars Emilio Estevez, Paul Gleason, Anthony Michael Hall, Judd Nelson, Molly Ringwald, and Ally Sheedy. The film tells the story of five teenagers from different high school cliques who serve a Saturday detention overseen by their authoritarian vice principal.

Hughes had written the script in 1982, and began casting for the film after the release of Sixteen Candles (1984). Filming took place from March to May 1984, and the entire film was shot at Maine North High School in Des Plaines, Illinois. Although the film is technically not an independent film due to Universal Pictures' involvement as a producer, The Breakfast Club has been popularly recognized as one; the low budget, Universal not being the primary production company, and the overall feel of the film are factors to its recognition.

The film premiered in Los Angeles on February 7, 1985, and was theatrically released by Universal Pictures on February 15, 1985. It grossed $52.1 million against a $1 million budget, and earned acclaim from critics, who consider it to be one of Hughes's most memorable and recognized works, and is considered one of the cornerstone films of the 1980s. The media subsequently referred to the film's five main actors as members of a group called the "Brat Pack". In 2015, the film was digitally remastered and was re-screened in 430 theaters in celebration of its 30th anniversary. In 2016, The Breakfast Club was selected for preservation in the United States National Film Registry by the Library of Congress as being "culturally, historically, or aesthetically significant". The film has been considered as one of the best films of the 1980s, and one of the best teen films of all time.

== Plot ==
On Saturday, March 24, 1984, five students at Shermer High School in Shermer, Illinois, report for an all-day detention: socially awkward nerd Brian Johnson, jock Andrew Clark, shy loner Allison Reynolds, popular girl Claire Standish, and rebellious delinquent John Bender. They gather in the school library and meet with their Vice Principal Richard Vernon, who warns them not to talk or move from their seats and assigns each of them the task of writing a minimum one-thousand-word essay describing who they think they are.

Bender ignores the rules and spends his time antagonizing the others and defying Vernon, who gives him eight additional weekends of detention. After lunch, the students sneak off to retrieve Bender's marijuana stash from his locker. When they see Vernon returning to the library, Bender deliberately gets caught to allow the others to sneak back in.

Locked in a storage closet as punishment, Bender is further berated by Vernon. Vernon tells him that he wants him to prove how tough he is and attempts to goad him into hitting him. Bender is visibly afraid and does not move. After Vernon leaves him, he escapes into the ceiling panels and falls into the library, where the others hide him.

The students pass the time arguing, listening to music, and smoking marijuana, gradually opening up about their home lives and their reasons for being in detention — Claire's popularity subjects her to intense peer pressure, while her bickering parents use her against each other. She received detention for skipping school to go shopping. Bender and his mother are physically abused by his father, including cigar burns and other injuries. He is serving detention for pulling the fire alarm. Andrew became influenced by jock culture and is intimidated by his father to succeed in wrestling, to the point of being unable to think for himself. He was given detention for taping a student's buttocks together in an attempt to win both his teammates' and his father's approval. Brian is under so much pressure from his parents to get top grades that he planned to suicide after getting an F in shop class. He was sent to detention for bringing a flare gun to school in order to carry out the suicide, which exploded in his locker. Allison is compulsively dishonest and has neglectful parents. She steals and hoards small things, which she claims she will use should she ever run away from home. She reveals that she showed up to detention for lack of anything better to do.

Despite their differences, the students realize they all face similar problems: Andrew and Allison bond over their complex relationships with their parents; Brian and Claire each feel anxiety over being virgins. While the group suspects that their new friendships will end once detention is over, they do admit they will look at their peers differently from now on.

Meanwhile, Vernon complains to the janitor, Carl, that students have become increasingly arrogant over the course of his teaching career, but Carl suggests that Vernon is the one who has changed and cares too much about what the students think of him.

The group convinces Brian to complete Vernon's essay on everyone's behalf. Claire gives Allison a makeover, which sparks romantic interest from Andrew, and Bender crawls back through the ceiling to the closet, where Claire challenges her "pristine" reputation by kissing him. As the students part ways, Allison and Andrew kiss, and she rips the state championship patch off his letterman jacket to keep. Claire gives Bender one of her diamond earrings, and they share their own kiss.

Vernon reads Brian's essay, which asserts that the vice principal has made petty assumptions about all of them and declares that "each one of us is a brain (Brian), an athlete (Andrew), a basket case (Allison), a princess (Claire), and a criminal (Bender). Does that answer your question? Sincerely yours, the Breakfast Club." Bender walks home across the school's football field, triumphantly raising his fist in the air.

== Cast ==
- Emilio Estevez as Andrew Clark, an athletic student in Saturday detention
- Paul Gleason as Richard Vernon, the school vice principal who oversees the Saturday detention
- Anthony Michael Hall as Brian Johnson, a brainy student in Saturday detention
- John Kapelos as Carl Reed, a school janitor
- Judd Nelson as John Bender, a delinquent student in Saturday detention
- Molly Ringwald as Claire Standish, a popular student in Saturday detention
- Ally Sheedy as Allison Reynolds, a loner student in Saturday detention
- Ron Dean as Mr. Clark, Andrew's father
- Mercedes Hall as Mrs. Johnson, Brian's mother
- Mary Christian as Brian's sister
- Tim Gamble as Mr. Standish, Claire's father
- Perry Crawford & Fran Gargano as (respectively) Mr. and Mrs. Reynolds, Allison's parents
- John Hughes as Mr. Johnson (uncredited cameo), Brian's father

== Production ==
=== Development ===
The title was originally The Lunch Bunch, but a friend of Hughes' from another school had a detention class called "The Breakfast Club", so he decided to go with that. Hughes wrote the script around the time when he was writing Sixteen Candles, but he wrote the Sixteen Candles script in mere days, and it impressed the studio executives who chose it to be his directorial debut.

=== Casting ===
Molly Ringwald and Anthony Michael Hall both starred in Hughes's 1984 film Sixteen Candles. Towards the end of filming, Hughes asked them to be in The Breakfast Club. Hall became the first to be cast, agreeing to the role of Brian Johnson; his real-life mother and sister played his character's mother and sister in the film. Ringwald was originally approached to play the character of Allison Reynolds, but she was "really upset" because she wanted to play Claire Standish (then named "Cathy" in the first draft of the script), which saw the auditions of Robin Wright, Jodie Foster, Diane Lane, and Laura Dern. She eventually convinced Hughes and the studio to give her the part. Joan Cusack was considered for the role of Allison before Ally Sheedy was ultimately cast.

Emilio Estevez was originally cast in the role of John Bender, but when Hughes was unable to find someone to play Andrew Clark, Estevez was recast. Nicolas Cage was considered for the role of John Bender, which was the last role to be cast. Alan Ruck also auditioned for the role, but the choice was narrowed down to John Cusack and Judd Nelson. Hughes originally cast Cusack, but decided to replace him with Nelson before shooting began, because Cusack did not look intimidating enough for the role. At one point, Hughes was disappointed in Nelson because he stayed in character and harassed Ringwald off-camera; the other actors had to convince Hughes not to fire him. Todd Bridges was offered to audition for an unspecified role after Hughes ran into to him on a plane, but he later walked away after one of the studio executives informed him that they didn't know how to write for black people. Rick Moranis was originally cast as the janitor, but was released by Ned Tanen, the film's producer, who felt that Moranis' portrayal as an over-the-top Russian caricature did not suit the serious nature of the film. Moranis was replaced by John Kapelos.

=== Filming ===
In 1999, Hughes said that his request to direct the film met with resistance and skepticism because he lacked filmmaking experience. He ultimately convinced the film's investors that, due to the modest $1 million budget and its single-location shoot, he could greatly minimize their risk. Hughes originally thought that The Breakfast Club would be his directorial debut. He opted for an insular, largely one-room set and wrote about high school students, who would be played by younger actors.

Principal photography began on March 28, 1984, and ended in May. Filming took place at Maine North High School in Des Plaines, Illinois, which had been closed in May 1981. The same school was used for interior scenes of Hughes's 1986 film Ferris Bueller's Day Off, which also featured exterior shots from nearby Glenbrook North High School. The appearance of the library at Maine North High, considered too small for use in the film, prompted the crew to build a virtually identical but larger set in the school's gymnasium. The actors rehearsed for three weeks and then shot the film in sequence. Nelson tried other opinions for the ending scene until eventually landing the fist pump. The dance sequence was originally scripted with Claire dancing alone, but Ringwald felt embarrassed about performing solo and Hughes agreed to have the others join her. On the Ferris Bueller's Day Off DVD commentary (featured on the 2004 DVD version), Hughes revealed that he shot the two films concurrently to save time and money, and some outtakes of both films feature elements of the film crews working on the other film. The first print was 150 minutes in length.

During a cast reunion in honor of the film's 25th anniversary, Ally Sheedy revealed that a director's cut existed; but Hughes's widow, who was also present, did not disclose any details concerning its whereabouts. In 2015, the first draft of the film's script was discovered in a Maine South High School cabinet as district employees were moving offices to a new building.

=== Poster ===
The film's poster, featuring the five characters huddled together, was photographed by Annie Leibovitz toward the end of shooting. The shot of five actors gazing at the camera influenced the way teen films were marketed from that point on. The poster refers to the five "types" of the story, using slightly different terms than those used in the film (and in a different sequence), stating "They were five total strangers with nothing in common, meeting for the first time. A brain, a beauty, a jock, a rebel and a recluse". The Breakfast Club poster "family shot", notably including Bender's raised fist, was satirized in the poster for the comedy-horror film The Texas Chainsaw Massacre 2. It also inspired the title page of chapter 29 of the manga series Akane-banashi.

== Themes ==
The main theme of the film is the constant struggle of the American teenager to be understood, both by adults and by themselves. It explores the pressure put on teenagers to fit into their own realms of high school social constructs, as well as the lofty expectations of their parents, teachers, and other authority figures. On the surface, the students have little in common with each other, but they eventually bond over a common disdain for the aforementioned peer pressure and parental expectations. Stereotyping is another theme. Once the obvious stereotypes are broken down, the characters "empathize with each other's struggles, dismiss some of the inaccuracies of their first impressions, and discover that they are more similar than different". The main adult character, Mr. Vernon, is portrayed with arguably no redeeming qualities; throughout the film, he consistently talks down to students, accesses private student information (then attempts to cover his tracks when confronted by a fellow employee) and forcefully flaunts his authority at each opportunity. He continually and aggressively challenges Bender, who is the only one of the group who chooses to stand up to him.

== Release ==
The film premiered in Los Angeles on February 7, 1985. Universal Pictures released the film in cinemas on February 15, 1985, in the United States.

=== Home media ===
The Breakfast Club was first released on VHS and LaserDisc. In 2003, the film was released on DVD as part of the "High School Reunion Collection". In 2008, a "Flashback Edition" DVD was released with several special features, including an audio commentary with Anthony Michael Hall and Judd Nelson. A 25th Anniversary Edition Blu-ray was released in 2010, and the same disc was re-released with a DVD and digital copy in 2012 as part of Universal's 100th Anniversary series.

On March 10, 2015, the 30th Anniversary Edition was released. This release was digitally remastered and restored from the original 35mm film negatives for better picture quality on DVD, Digital HD and Blu-ray. The Criterion Collection released a special edition two-disc DVD set and a Blu-ray disc on January 2, 2018. The transfer was the same as the previous release but included new features such as fifty minutes of new, deleted and extended scenes, an Electronic Press Kit, new and archival interviews, a 1985 excerpt of the Today program, a new video essay and an episode of This American Life. Criterion released the film on Ultra HD Blu-ray on November 4, 2025, based on a new 4K scan of the film.

== Reception ==
=== Critical response ===
Roger Ebert awarded three stars out of four and called the performances "wonderful", adding that the film was "more or less predictable" but "doesn't need earthshaking revelations; it's about kids who grow willing to talk to one another, and it has a surprisingly good ear for the way they speak." Gene Siskel of the Chicago Tribune gave the film three-and-a-half stars out of four, and wrote: "This confessional formula has worked in films as different as Who's Afraid of Virginia Woolf?, The Big Chill, and My Dinner with Andre and it works here too. It works especially well in The Breakfast Club because we keep waiting for the film to break out of its claustrophobic set and give us a typical teenage movie sex-or-violence scene. That doesn't happen, much to our delight." Kathleen Carroll from the New York Daily News stated, "Hughes has a wonderful knack for communicating the feelings of teenagers, as well as an obvious rapport with his exceptional cast–who deserve top grades."

Other reviews were less positive. Janet Maslin of The New York Times wrote, "There are some good young actors in The Breakfast Club, though a couple of them have been given unplayable roles", namely Ally Sheedy and Judd Nelson, adding, "The five young stars would have mixed well even without the fraudulent encounter-group candor towards which The Breakfast Club forces them. Mr. Hughes, having thought up the characters and simply flung them together, should have left well enough alone." James Harwood of Variety panned the film as a movie that "will probably pass as deeply profound among today's teenage audience, meaning the youngsters in the film spend most of their time talking to each other instead of dancing, dropping their drawers and throwing food. This, on the other hand, should not suggest they have anything intelligent to say."

Among retrospective reviews, James Berardinelli wrote in 1998: "Few will argue that The Breakfast Club is a great film, but it has a candor that is unexpected and refreshing in a sea of too-often generic teen-themed films. The material is a little talky (albeit not in a way that will cause anyone to confuse it with something by Éric Rohmer), but it's hard not to be drawn into the world of these characters."

On the review aggregator website Rotten Tomatoes, the film holds an approval rating of 87% based on 114 reviews, with an average rating of 7.60/10. The website's critics consensus reads, "If The Breakfast Club's gestures towards authenticity are occasionally undercut by trendy flourishes, its blistering emotional honesty and talented troupe of young actors catapult it to the top of the teen comedy class." Metacritic gave the film a weighted average score of 66 out of 100 based on 25 reviews from mainstream critics, considered to be "generally favorable reviews".

Writing in 2015, P. J. O'Rourke called The Breakfast Club and Ferris Bueller's Day Off "Hughes's masterwork[s]". He described the former film as an example of Hughes's politics, in that the students do not organize a protest, but "present themselves, like good conservatives do, as individuals and place the highest value, like this conservative does, on goofing off. Otherwise known as individual liberty."

=== Box office ===
In February 1985, the film debuted at No. 3 at the box office (behind Beverly Hills Cop and Witness). Grossing $46,434,721 domestically and $52,084,721 worldwide, the film was a box office success, given its $1 million budget.

=== Accolades ===
Anthony Michael Hall, Judd Nelson, Molly Ringwald, Paul Gleason and Ally Sheedy all won a Silver Bucket of Excellence Award at the 2005 MTV Movie Awards.

Award	Nominee	Result
Silver Bucket of Excellence Award	Anthony Michael Hall; Judd Nelson; Paul Gleason; Molly Ringwald; Ally Sheedy	Won

== Legacy ==
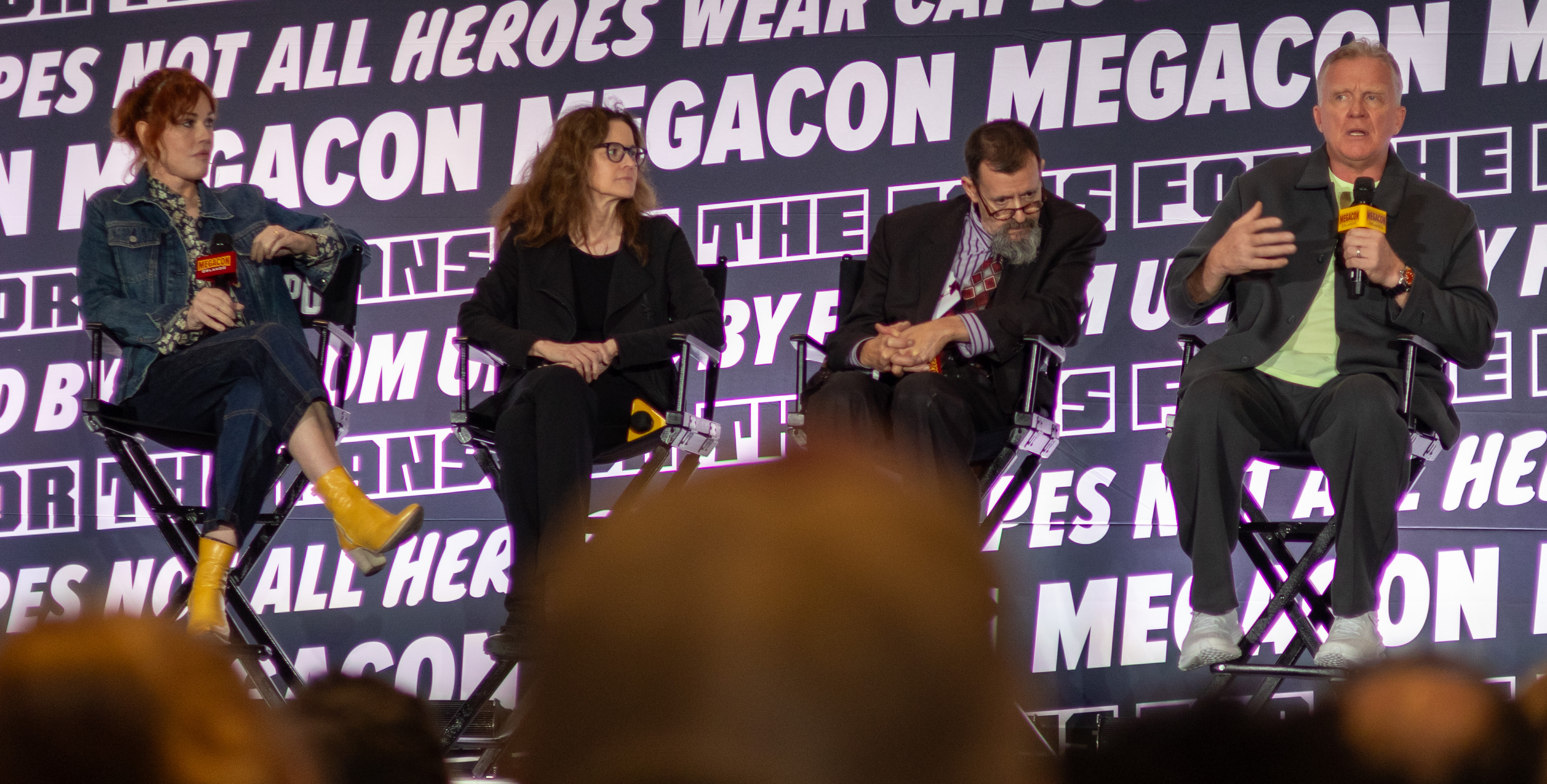
From left: Molly Ringwald, Ally Sheedy, Judd Nelson and Anthony Michael Hall in February 2025

The Breakfast Club has been called the quintessential 1980s film. In 2008, Empire magazine ranked it at number 369 on their The 500 Greatest Movies of All Time list. It later ranked at number 38 on their 2014 list. Similarly, The New York Times placed the film on its Best 1000 Movies Ever list and Entertainment Weekly ranked the film number 1 on its list of the 50 Best High School Movies. In the 2001 parody film Not Another Teen Movie, Gleason reprised his role as Assistant Principal Vernon in a short scene that parodies The Breakfast Club. To emphasize its eminent position within the canon of American coming-of-age films and its continued influence to this day, scholar Björn Sonnenberg-Schrank called The Breakfast Club "the Citizen Kane of the teen film genre". Sebastian Stan described the superhero film Thunderbolts* (2025) as "The Breakfast Club of Marvel".

In 2005, the film received the Silver Bucket of Excellence Award in honor of its 20th anniversary at the MTV Movie Awards. For the event, MTV attempted to reunite the original cast. Sheedy, Ringwald, and Hall appeared together on stage, with Kapelos in the audience; Gleason gave the award to his former castmates. Estevez could not attend because of other commitments, and Nelson appeared earlier in the show but left before the on-stage reunion, prompting Hall to joke that the two were "in Africa with Dave Chappelle". Yellowcard performed Simple Minds' anthem for the film, "Don't You (Forget About Me)", at the awards. At the 82nd Academy Awards (March 7, 2010), Sheedy, Hall, Ringwald, and Nelson all appeared in a tribute to John Hughes—who had died the prior year—along with other actors who had worked with him, including Jon Cryer from Pretty in Pink, Matthew Broderick from Ferris Bueller's Day Off, and Macaulay Culkin from Home Alone. In 2012, the Nickelodeon television series Victorious had their own spoof on the film, in the episode titled "The Breakfast Bunch".

In 2018, The New Yorker published an article written by Ringwald in which she critiqued Hughes's films "in the age of #MeToo", beginning with a discussion of how she explained to her ten-year-old daughter what happened in the scene when her character seems to be sexually assaulted under a desk. The essay provoked some to claim that Ringwald was criticizing the director who made her into a film star, but she was defended by Jenny Han for a "tender, fair-minded piece".

In April 2025, all five principal stars reunited in Chicago during a panel discussion, marking the first time the cast had been together in forty years.

== Soundtrack ==
The Breakfast Club (Original Motion Picture Soundtrack)

Soundtrack album by various artists
- Released: February 19, 1985
- Recorded: 1984
- Genres: Rock, new wave
- Length: 37:59
- Label: A&M
- Producer: various artists

Singles from The Breakfast Club (Original Motion Picture Soundtrack)
- 1. "Don't You (Forget About Me)" Released: February 20, 1985 (US); 2. "Fire in the Twilight" Released: May 1985

Audio sample
- "Don't You (Forget About Me)" by Simple Minds: file; help

The film's soundtrack, The Breakfast Club (Original Motion Picture Soundtrack), was produced by British pop musician Keith Forsey and released on February 19, 1985, by A&M Records. The album peaked at No. 17 on the US Billboard 200 album chart. The song "Don't You (Forget About Me)", performed by Scottish rock band Simple Minds, was released as a single on February 23, 1985, in the United States and reached No. 1 on the Billboard Hot 100. It was released on April 8, 1985, in the United Kingdom.

=== Track listing ===
Side one
No.	Title	Writer(s)	Performer	Length
1.	"Don't You (Forget About Me)"	Keith Forsey, Steve Schiff	Simple Minds	4:20
2.	"Waiting"	K. Forsey, S. Schiff	Elizabeth Daily	4:37
3.	"Fire in the Twilight"	Jack Hues; K. Forsey; S. Schiff	Wang Chung	3:51
4.	"I'm the Dude"	K. Forsey, S. Schiff	Keith Forsey	2:10
5.	"Heart Too Hot to Hold"	Johnson; K. Forsey; Laurie Forsey; Michael Frondelli	Jesse Johnson & Stephanie Spruill	4:25
Total length:				19:23

Side two
No.	Title	Writer(s)	Performer	Length
1.	"Dream Montage"	Chang	Gary Chang	2:37
2.	"We Are Not Alone"	DeVito; Robbie Benson; Steve Goldstein	Karla DeVito	3:39
3.	"The Reggae"	Forsey	Keith Forsey	3:07
4.	"Didn't I Tell You"	K. Forsey; L. Forsey; S. Schiff	Joyce Kennedy	4:47
5.	"Love Theme"	Forsey	Keith Forsey	4:26
Total length:				18:36

=== Overview ===
The album contains ten songs that are played partially throughout the movie, performed by bands and singers of the rock and new wave genres, including three instrumental songs by record producer Keith Forsey. Simple Minds's international hit "Don't You (Forget About Me)" is played in the opening and closing credits. A music video was made for this song and for Wang Chung's "Fire in the Twilight" (reached No 110 on the US Billboard Hot 100). Not included on the soundtrack is the "Colonel Bogey March" that the students are whistling when Principal Vernon walks into the room.

=== Critical reception ===
In a June 25, 1985 review for The Village Voice, music critic Robert Christgau gave the album a "D−" and said that it has "utterly negligible" songs, and he commended Simple Minds for trying to distance themselves from their song, "Don't You (Forget About Me)", best known for being played during the film's opening and closing credits. In a retrospective review for AllMusic, Stephen Thomas Erlewine gave the soundtrack three out of five stars and wrote that, apart from Simple Minds' "undisputed masterpiece", the album is largely "disposable" and marred by "'80s artifacts" and "forgettable instrumentals".

=== Charts ===
Chart (1985)	Peak position
Canada Top Albums/CDs (RPM)	29
US Billboard 200	17

== Cancelled sequel ==
Hughes had considered a sequel to the film, focusing on the teens reuniting years later while serving detention in university, now as the polar opposite of how they were in the first film. The film was never made prior to Hughes' death.
