= Fresh Horses (film) =

1988 coming-of-age drama film directed by David Anspaugh

- Theatrical release poster
- Directed by: David Anspaugh
- Written by: Larry Ketron
- Produced by: Richard Berg
- Starring: Molly Ringwald; Andrew McCarthy; Patti D'Arbanville; Ben Stiller
- Cinematography: Fred Murphy
- Edited by: David Rosenbloom
- Music by: David Foster; Patrick Williams
- Production company: Weintraub Entertainment Group
- Distributed by: Columbia Pictures
- Release date: November 18, 1988
- Running time: 105 minutes
- Country: United States
- Language: English
- Budget: $14 million
- Box office: $6.6 million

Fresh Horses is a 1988 American coming-of-age drama film directed by David Anspaugh, and starring Andrew McCarthy and Molly Ringwald.

== Plot ==
University of Cincinnati senior Matt Larkin has the picture-perfect life - he comes from a well-to-do family, has good grades, is well-liked by his peers, hosts Bingo games for the elderly, and is engaged to Alice. One day, after class, his best friend Tipton introduces him to Sproles, a fellow student who has a brother that works as an undercover cop. They tell Matt about their night out in the country filled with seedy characters, beer, and music in a house owned by a woman named Jean, and invites him to join them on their next visit. Matt initially scoffs at the idea, but as he ponders his imminent marriage, decides to check it out with Tipton.

The two drive out to Jean's house expecting a wild party, but find only the aftermath of the previous night. Disappointed, Matt goes to the kitchen to fetch a beer for Tipton and runs into Jewel, a neighbor who comes to Jean's house to escape her abusive stepfather. Matt is instantly drawn to her and returns to the countryside to spend more time with her. They eventually start a relationship, prompting Matt to break off his engagement with a devastated Alice.

As Matt and Jewel continue their relationship, Tipton informs Matt that Jewel is married and that she's sixteen years old. When he confronts Jewel with what he heard, she denies being underage, but admits to being married and explains that she only married her husband Green to escape her stepfather, but later finds out her husband is just as abusive and that she never consummated her marriage. Matt asks Tipton for his cousin's help in getting an annulment for Jewel and ends up having an argument with Tipton. Matt is then kicked out of his parents' house after his father discovers him and Jewel sneaking around in the middle of the night, causing Matt to move into a run down shack where the lovers would meet.

Tipton and Sproles meet Matt at a diner, and convince him that Jewel has been manipulating him. He ends up moving back into his parents house and leaves money for Jewel to use for her annulment. After drinking with Tipton and a few of their friends, Matt brings them out to the shack. Jewel barges in on them before talking to Matt privately and asking to borrow his car so she can meet with Green. When his friends tell him to leave with them, Matt refuses and waits for Jewel to come back. When she doesn't come back, Matt goes to Jean's house and she tells him that Jewel is at her mother's place.

Matt meets with Jewel to ask her what happened the night before. She tells him that she met Green at a bar and tried to make him sign the annulment papers, but he refused and she ended up being exhibited and sexually assaulted in the back of Matt's car. She then says that she saw Sproles and that he was one of her assailants. When Matt angrily confronts Sproles, he says that he saw Green holding money he won from betting, and that Jewel might have perceived it as payment to be exhibited. He tells Matt that he was merely a bystander and that he was there with his brother, who would've arrested Green and his thugs if Jewel was being mistreated. Frustrated and confused by the whole situation, Matt decides to confront Green. Matt knocks the door at Green's house, but lets himself in when no one answers. Green finds him in the living room and they begin to argue when Jewel walks in on them. She throws the annulment papers at Green then angrily breaks off her relationship with Matt before walking out of the house.

A year later, Matt returns home from graduate school to visit his friends and family for Christmas. He runs into Jewel at an ice skating rink and finds out that she's divorced from Green, is attending high school, has quit smoking, and introduces him to Steven, a classmate she's dating. Jewel then bids Matt goodbye, kisses his cheek and thanks him. A tearful Matt watches Jewel from afar as he smiles and walks away.

== Cast ==
- Molly Ringwald as Jewel
- Andrew McCarthy as Matt Larkin
- Patti D'Arbanville as Jean
- Ben Stiller as Tipton
- Leon Russom as Matt's Dad
- Molly Hagan as Ellen
- Viggo Mortensen as Green
- Kent Poole as Stephen

In addition, Doug Hutchison portrays Sproles, while Chiara Peacock appears as Alice.

== Original play ==
The film was based on a play by Larry Ketron. It debuted on February 11, 1986, Off Broadway at the WPA Theatre in New York, starring Craig Sheffer and Suzy Amis. Dann Florek directed, and the cast also included Mark Benninghofen, John Bowman, Marissa Chibas, Alice Haining and Havilland Morris.

Frank Rich of The New York Times wrote that the play:

Is more a collection of lively scenes and funny speeches than a sustained work; it doesn't so much come to a point as slow to a halt. But the evening is highly entertaining along its way -far more so than other Ketron plays, largely set in the same milieu, that have appeared at the WPA and elsewhere over the past decade. If this playwright writes rather formlessly – and can still hand inarticulate characters erudite authorial pronouncements – he has finally perfected the pitch of his comic voice. That voice is not the Deep Southern belt of Eudora Welty... but the twang of the modern border states, where new money has eroded Dixie tradition and landscape alike.

Amis's performance in particular was much praised.

== Production ==
Film rights were bought by Weintraub Entertainment, a new company from Jerry Weintraub. It would be their first production (although they distributed The Big Blue.)

"It's a passionate love story", said Ringwald. "He's a yuppie, a young guy engaged to be married. He meets me -- uneducated, almost illiterate, sexy, complex, dangerous. So mismatched they can never work out, but they're in love."

She added it was "very dark story about two very different people. It's like a love story that was doomed from the beginning. There's a lot more layers and the character goes into a lot more depth than the other characters I've done."

Her fee was reportedly between $500,000 and $1 million (equivalent to between $1.4 million to $2.8 million in 2025).

Ringwald and Andrew McCarthy had previously played mismatched lovers in Pretty in Pink and Ringwald admitted, "It was a big question in all our minds before we started the film. Are people going to see this as Pretty in Pink II? It's stupid, I'm a good actress and he's a good actor and we're good together. Once we dove in and started working, Pretty in Pink never came up."

"I think you have to use your imagination to a large degree", she said about her character. "I've never been raped. I didn't grow up the way she did. I had to use research, meet people, look through pictures. Just get a feel for it and use your imagination. Jewel is not as educated as I am, but she knows exactly what's going on."

Filming started in Cincinnati on 9 November 1987.

Filming locations in Kentucky included Campbell, Kenton, Boone and Gallatin Counties, and the city of Warsaw; In Ohio, the University of Cincinnati, the city of Cincinnati, Americana Amusement Park in Monroe, Ohio, and Kings Island amusement park, then in Deerfield Township, Warren County, Ohio; and Switzerland County, Indiana.

"It was cold", said McCarthy. "There's the whole starkness up there; it helped the mood of the movie."

== Reception ==
The film performed poorly, earning $3,074,292 in the opening weekend, and a total of $6,640,346 domestically, failing to recoup its $14 million budget. Audiences polled by CinemaScore gave the film an average grade of "D+" on an A+ to F scale.

In his review for the Los Angeles Times, Michael Wilmington said, "[t]here's a lot to admire in the film adaptation of Larry Ketron's play 'Fresh Horses'" and called the dialogue "fresh, sad and funny." He also praised the work of director Anspaugh and cinematographer Fred Murphy, saying they give the movie "a very distinctive look: moody and poetic, grainy and wistful, drenched with a sad, faraway, forget-me-not drizzle of passion and regrets." However, he concluded that the "movie refuses to jell." "Good on them for trying", said Filmink.

== See also ==
- List of films with a 0% rating on Rotten Tomatoes
