= Betsy's Wedding =

1990 film by Alan Alda

- Theatrical release poster
- Directed by: Alan Alda
- Written by: Alan Alda
- Produced by: Martin Bregman; Louis A. Stroller
- Starring: Alan Alda; Joey Bishop; Madeline Kahn; Catherine O'Hara; Joe Pesci; Ally Sheedy; Burt Young; Molly Ringwald
- Cinematography: Kelvin Pike
- Edited by: Michael E. Polakow
- Music by: Bruce Broughton
- Production companies: Touchstone Pictures; Silver Screen Partners IV; Martin Bregman Productions
- Distributed by: Buena Vista Pictures Distribution
- Release date: June 22, 1990
- Running time: 94 minutes
- Country: United States
- Language: English
- Box office: $19.7 million

Betsy's Wedding is a 1990 American romantic comedy film written and directed by Alan Alda. The film stars Alda, Joey Bishop, Madeline Kahn, Catherine O'Hara, Joe Pesci, Ally Sheedy, Bibi Besch, Burt Young and Molly Ringwald. It was theatrically released in the United States on June 22, 1990, by Buena Vista Pictures Distribution.

== Plot ==
Eddie Hopper is a construction contractor from Long Island, New York, and dad of two daughters, Connie and Betsy, who is about to be married. Money is tight in the Hopper household, but Eddie, much to the dismay of his wife, Lola, decides that it is important to throw a lavish wedding to impress the wealthy family of Betsy's fiancé Jake Lovell. Everyone in the family is throwing advice Eddie's way, even his father's ghost.

A new house Eddie is building is adding to his financial and emotional woes. In desperation, he turns to his corrupt brother-in-law, Oscar Henner, who ends up getting Eddie involved with loan sharks. Stevie Dee is sent to keep an eye on Eddie, but instead turns his gaze to Connie, who is a police officer. Betsy's wedding ultimately goes ahead as planned but is disrupted by a torrential downpour of rain.

== Cast ==
- Alan Alda as Eddie Hopper
- Joey Bishop as Mr. Hopper
- Madeline Kahn as Lola Hopper
- Anthony LaPaglia as Stevie Dee
- Catherine O'Hara as Gloria Henner
- Joe Pesci as Oscar Henner
- Molly Ringwald as Betsy Hopper
- Ally Sheedy as Connie Hopper
- Burt Young as Georgie
- Julie Bovasso as Rose Hopper
- Nicolas Coster as Harry Lovell
- Bibi Besch as Nancy Lovell
- Dylan Walsh as Jake Lovell
- Camille Saviola as Angelica Hopper
- Allan Rich as Nate Tobias
- Sully Boyar as Morris
- Frankie Faison as Zack Monroe
- Tom Mardirosian as Dale Delahaas
- Larry Block as Barber
- Helen Hanft as Fitter
- Samuel L. Jackson as Mickey

== Production ==
The plot was reportedly inspired by the marriage of Alan Alda's youngest daughter Beatrice.

== Reception ==
=== Critical response ===
Betsy's Wedding received mixed reviews from critics. On Rotten Tomatoes it has an approval rating of 56% based on reviews from 16 critics. Metacritic, which uses a weighted average, assigned the film a score of 52 out of 100, based on 21 critics, indicating "mixed or average" critics. Reviews of the film included comments such as "threadbare concoction", "narcissism flourishing like ragweed" and "unctuous".

Betsy's Wedding has been cited as launching the film career of Anthony LaPaglia. Joe Pesci was asked about the film in interviews and declined to discuss it.

=== Accolades ===
Year	Award	Category	Nominee(s)	Result	Ref.
1991	Chicago Film Critics Association Awards	Most Promising Actor	Anthony LaPaglia	Nominated	
1991	Golden Raspberry Awards	Worst Actress	Molly Ringwald	Nominated	
1991	Golden Raspberry Awards	Worst Supporting Actress	Ally Sheedy	Nominated	
