= David Blum =

American writer and editor

David Blum is an American writer and editor.

Blum was born in Queens, New York, and graduated with a degree in English literature from the University of Chicago in 1977.

He began his career as a reporter in 1979 for The Wall Street Journal. He has also worked for Esquire (where he became as associate editor in 1983), been a contributing editor at New York Magazine (1985–1992), and a regular contributor to The New York Times Magazine (1995–2000).

A 1985 New York Magazine cover story by Blum is credited for coining the term Brat Pack for a group of young 1980s actors.

In 1992, he published his first book, Flash In The Pan: The Life and Death of an American Restaurant, which was named a notable nonfiction book of the year by The New York Times Book Review. He published his second book, Tick...Tick...Tick...: The Long Life & Turbulent Times of 60 Minutes, in 2004.

In 2002, he was named an adjunct professor at the Columbia University Graduate School of Journalism.

Blum was editor-in-chief of The Village Voice from September 2006 through March 2007 (one in a string of editors the publication had in a short period of time), and editor-in-chief of the New York Press from September 2007 through June 2008. In the latter half of 2008, he briefly served as editor-in-chief of the short-lived 02138 magazine. He has also served as editorial director of its owner (and the owner of the New York Press), Manhattan Media.

In 2010, Blum joined Amazon.com as the founding editor of Kindle single, the retailer's effort to sell long-form nonfiction for its e-reader device. In 2016, Blum moved to Audible Inc. as editor-in-chief of Audible Original Publishing.

== Personal life ==
Blum is married to television writer and producer Terri Minsky.
