= Links (Mark Murphy album) =

2000 studio album by Mark Murphy

Studio album by Mark Murphy
- Released: 2001
- Recorded: 2000
- Studio: M & I Studios, New York City
- Genre: Vocal jazz
- Label: HighNote Records
- Producer: Don Sickler

Mark Murphy chronology
The Latin Porter (2000)	Links (2001)	Lucky to Be Me (2002)

Links is a studio album by Mark Murphy.

Links is the 39th album by American jazz vocalist Mark Murphy. It was recorded in 2000 when Murphy was 68 years old and released by the HighNote label in the United States in 2001. It is his second release on HighNote. This album is a collection of standards and original songs.

== Background ==
Links was recorded at the end of 2000, the same year Murphy recorded and released The Latin Porter, with most of the same personnel from his prior release on HighNote records, Some Time Ago.

Don Sickler, who worked with Murphy on Some Time Ago, returned as producer for Murphy's second project with HighNote. Lee Musiker also returned as arranger and pianist, as did bassists Steve LaSpina and Sean Smith, drummer Winard Harper, saxophonist Allen Mezquida, and trumpeter Dave Ballou.

== Recording ==
Murphy contributes an original composition, "Breathing", and the lyrics to three additional songs, one by bassist Sean Smith ("Taming of a Rose") and two by Alan Broadbent ("Don't Ask Why" and "Ode to the Road"). Murphy is joined by Paulo Braga on drums, Sérgio Brandão on bass, and Cidinho Teixeira on piano for his composition "Breathing". Memo Acevedo is featured on percussion. Tim Horner is the drummer on four tracks.

Bassist Sean Smith (on four tracks) worked frequently with Murphy. He wrote the songs "I'll Call You" and "Song for the Geese (Tema Para los Gansos)" with Murphy. Bassist Steve LaSpina (on four tracks) previously recorded with Murphy on Beauty and the Beast and Kerouac, Then and Now. Saxophonist Mezquida helped inspire Murphy to write the lyrics for "Song for the Geese" on Song for the Geese. Murphy heard Mezquida playing the melody of Sean Smith's song in a nightclub appearance with Smith's band. "I never forgot the way he played", Mark said in the liner notes to Some Time Ago. Trumpeter Dave Ballou knew Murphy from a teaching job in Italy. "I was amazed at how he played outside the song harmonically", said Murphy. Ballou previously recorded with Roseanna Vitro and Steve LaSpina.

== Reception ==
Professional ratings
Review scores
Source	Rating
The Penguin Guide to Jazz Recordings	3.5/4 stars

Richard Cook and Brian Martin assign 4 qualified stars to Links in The Penguin Guide to Jazz Recordings. (***(*), meaning, "An excellent record, with some exceptional music. Only kept out of the front rank by some minor reservations").

Scott Yanow includes Links in his list of Murphy's "other worthy recordings of the past 20 years" in his book The Jazz Singers: The Ultimate Guide.

Murphy biographer Peter Jones included "In the Land of Oo-Bla-Dee" by Milt Orent and Mary Lou Williams on his list of "10 tracks by Mark Murphy I Can't Do Without". He applauded the choice of songs on the album but found the scat singing on Alan Broadbent's "Ode to the Road" and "The Lady's in Love with You" (a hit for Glenn Miller) to be "ugly and intrusive".

Christopher Louden praised the album in his JazzTimes review. He wrote, "Mark Murphy is blessed with a magical ability to reinvent and repackage himself. From brash, young hipster to brazen pathfinder to sage elder statesman, he has managed to hold our rapt attention through each incarnation. No wonder, then, that he has outplayed and outlasted almost all of his peers, and is, at age 69, still at the top of his game. Aptly representative of Murphy’s trademark eclecticism, Links is a satisfying marriage of old, new, borrowed and blue".

== Track listing ==
1. "In the Land of Oo-Bla-Dee" (Milt Orent, Mary Lou Williams) – 5:39
2. "The Lady's in Love with You" (Frank Loesser, Burton Lane) – 7:16
3. "Don't Ask Why" (Mark Murphy, Alan Broadbent) – 7:31
4. "Wheelers and Dealers" (Dave Frishberg) – 5:26
5. "Taming of a Rose" (Murphy, Sean Smith) – 6:10
6. "Breathing" (Murphy) – 5:12
7. "A Flower Is a Lovesome Thing" (Billy Strayhorn) – 7:02
8. "Ode to the Road" (Murphy, Broadbent) – 6:18
9. "Medley: Daydream / In a Sentimental Mood" (John Latouche, Duke Ellington, Strayhorn / Manny Kurtz, Irving Mills, Ellington) – 7:15
10. "I'm Thru with Love" (Gus Kahn, Fud Livingston, Matty Malneck) – 4:47

== Personnel ==
Performance

- Mark Murphy – vocals, vocals arranger
- Lee Musiker – piano (tracks 1–5, 7–10), arranger
- Steve LaSpina – bass (tracks 2–3, 8–9)
- Sean Smith – bass (tracks 1, 4–5, 7)
- Winard Harper – drums (tracks 2–3, 8–9)
- Tim Horner – drums (tracks 1, 4–5, 7)
- Dave Ballou – trumpet (tracks 1–5, 8–9)
- Allen Mezquida – alto saxophone (tracks 1–2, 4–5, 7–9)
- Memo Acevedo – percussion
- Angela DeNiro – vocals (track 2)
- Paulo Braga – drums (track 6)
- Sérgio Brandão – bass (track 6)
- Cidinho Teixeira – piano (track 6)

Production

- Ira Yuspeh – engineer, recorded at M & I Studios, New York City (from 2000-12-27 until 2000-12-28)
- Clara Chodack, W. Fordham Murphy – assistant engineer
- Don Sickler – producer
- William Claxton – photography
- Denis Mete – cover water color of Mark Murphy
- Joe Fields – executive producer
- Peter Muller – album design
- Mark Murphy – liner notes
