= Lucky to Be Me =

2001 studio album by Mark Murphy

Studio album by Mark Murphy
- Released: 2002
- Recorded: 2001
- Studios: M&I Studios, New York City
- Genre: Vocal jazz
- Length: 54:23
- Label: HighNote Records
- Producer: Don Sickler

Mark Murphy chronology
Links (2001)	Lucky to Be Me (2002)	Memories of You: Remembering Joe Williams (2003)

Lucky to Be Me is a studio album by Mark Murphy.

Lucky to Be Me is the 40th album by American jazz vocalist Mark Murphy. It was recorded in when Murphy was 69 years old and released by the HighNote label in the United States in 2002. It is his third of five releases on HighNote. This album is a collection of standards and one original song by Mark Murphy performed with a jazz sextet.

== Background ==
Don Sickler, who worked with Murphy on Some Time Ago and Links returned as producer for Murphy's third project with HighNote. Lee Musiker also returned as arranger and pianist. Musiker was known for accompanying singers such as Chris Connor, Susannah McCorkle, Carol Sloane and Tony Bennett. Memo Acevedo, who also performed on Links, returned on percussion and Tim Horner returns on drums. Jay Leonhart and David Finck share duties on double bass. Trumpeter Scott Wendholt and Bobby Porcelli round out the sextet.

== Recording ==
The album opens with a medley of three songs from Leonard Bernstein's On the Town, set in New York City. The recording took place in New York not long after the 9/11 attacks. Murphy's said, "I wanted to sing 'New York, New York' (from the musical On The Town) first because right away those words trumpet New York and New Yorkers' courage in the wake of the tragedy of Sept. 11. I found these songs in books at the school where I taught in Graz, Austria, and in helping the students find material I was re-drawn to these three, all killer Bernstein songs."

"Dearly Beloved" is a Johnny Mercer and Jerome Kern Oscar nominated song from the 1942 movie musical You Were Never Lovelier, where it was introduced by Fred Astaire. It lost the Academy Award for Best Original Song to Irving Berlin's "White Christmas" from Holiday Inn.

"Then I'll Be Tired of You" by Arthur Schwartz and E.Y. Harburg had a special history with Murphy. Murphy said, "When I got to New York in 1953 'Then I'll Be Tired of You' was one of the 'in' songs. I got into this little piano bar thing, a place that later moved around the corner and became Jilly's [Jilly Rizzo's club, Jilly's Saloon] . . . But when I started going there 'Then I'll Be Tired of You' was one of the cult hits of a guy named Nicky DeFrancis, who sang and played piano at this particular bar. He was something else. Played like Erroll Garner and was one of those South Philadelphia crooners, of the Italian style."

Murphy often recorded Brazilian jazz and here he includes Jobim's "Photograph (Fotografia)". Murphy said, "I don't think he ever got more tension out of fewer notes; I don't believe he used more than six or seven in the entire melody. It just encapsulates his genius".

Murphy considered himself a rhythm singer. Murphy said," 'Dearly Beloved' and 'Serenade In Blue' have got natural drummers' rhythms." Referring to "Serenade In Blue" by Harry Warren and Mack Gordon, Murphy said, "it becomes such a rhythmic romp that when you get to the bridge, when does it end? Certain songs invite rhythm, even though they might have been written for another era, you know?"

"Just as Though You Were Here" was a hit for Frank Sinatra and Pied Pipers with the Tommy Dorsey band. In the liner notes, Murphy dedicated the recording to a friend from England, "for whom the song 'has deep personal meaning. Jesus, the way Lee [Musiker] plays on that. I heard him 25 years ago when he came to San Francisco with Chris Connor, and it took me all that time to get him' ".

"I Ain't Gonna Let You Break My Heart" by David Lasley was a song Murphy heard "on a jukebox in a bar near his home in the Poconos". The recording was by Bonnie Raitt, with Herbie Hancock, on her 1989 three time Grammy award-winning album Nick of Time. Murphy said, "I call it a country blues. I always tell my students to listen to this woman, because you can hear every word she sings."

Murphy contributes an original composition, "Blues for Frances Faye". It was developed spontaneously in the studio. Murphy said it recalls a singer who, "dared to be bizarre in the up-tight, button-down '50s. Did you ever see Bruce Weber's documentary 'Chop Suey'? Frances is in it, and so is that woman who used to run Vogue [Diana Vreeland]. It's so off-the-wall, I was in hysterics for practically half the film. I get the feeling that maybe Janis Joplin stumbled across Frances somewhere in a former life or something, and heard that extra-ballsy type singing"

"I Wonder What Became of Me" by Harold Arlen and Jonny Mercer was dropped from their musical St. Louis Woman. Along with Noël Coward's "If Love Were All", they form the final medley. Murphy fantasizes, "I would end my last concert with them, then walk slo-o-o-w-l-y backward into a dimming spotlight. Or, if l've learned to levitate myself by then, l'd do that. There are a couple of Noel Coward songs, I suppose they're not really in my style, but they bring tears to my eyes every time I hear them".

Murphy explains his approach in the liner notes. Speaking about his hipster bebop image he says, "I've grown beyond that, and my answer to people who can't keep up with me is, 'It isn't my fault if I grow and they can't'. I'm not saying that in a egotistic way, because I'm not a tripper. I'm just a working artist. Maybe I should have some more ego-tripping in me. It would keep me more focused. But I don't, so there you are".

== Reception ==
Professional ratings
Review scores
Source	Rating
The Penguin Guide to Jazz Recordings	3.5/4 stars

Richard Cook and Brian Martin assign 4 qualified stars to Links in The Penguin Guide to Jazz Recordings. (***(*), meaning, "An excellent record, with some exceptional music. Only kept out of the front rank by some minor reservations"). They write the release is, "a nicely paced mixed bag of good songs, several relatively unexposed . . . The voice may have frayed a little, but the mastery is absolutely intact".

Scott Yanow includes Links in his list of Murphy's "other worthy recordings of the past 20 years" in his book The Jazz Singers: The Ultimate Guide.

Murphy biographer Peter Jones praises the opening On the Town medley and Jobim's 'Photograph', but complains that "on 'Serenade in Blue' and 'Dearly Beloved', the bebopper in Murphy overwhelms the material, the yaps, yelps and slurs an unwelcome distraction from the songs".

Christopher Louden praised the album in his JazzTimes review. He wrote that Murphy's voice is superb, "made all the richer by the grit of advancing age".

== Track listing ==
1. "Lonely Town" (Leonard Bernstein, Adolph Green, Betty Comden) – 3:14
2. "Lucky to Be Me" (Bernstein, Green, Comden) – 2:58
3. "Some Other Time" (Bernstein, Green, Comden) – 4:16
4. "Dearly Beloved " (Jerome Kern, Johnny Mercer) – 4:06
5. "Then I'll Be Tired of You" (Arthur Schwartz, E.Y. Harburg) – 4:42
6. "Photograph" (Antônio Carlos Jobim, Ray Gilbert) – 6:21
7. "Serenade in Blue" (Harry Warren, Mack Gordon) – 5:58
8. "Just as Though You Were Here" (John Benson Brooks, Eddie DeLange) – 7:08
9. "I Ain't Gonna Let You Break My Heart" (David Lasley, Julie Lasley) – 4:11
10. "Blues for Frances Faye" (Mark Murphy) – 4:52
11. Medley: "I Wonder What Became of Me" / "If Love Were All" (Harold Arlen, Mercer / Noël Coward) – 6:37

== Personnel ==
Performance

- Mark Murphy – vocals, vocals arranger
- Lee Musiker – piano, arranger
- Jay Leonhart – bass (tracks 1–3, 5, 7, 10)
- David Finck – bass (tracks 4, 6, 8, 11)
- Tim Horner – drums
- Scott Wendholt – trumpet, flugelhorn
- Bobby Porcelli – flute, alto saxophone
- Memo Acevedo – percussion

Production

- Ira Yuspeh – engineer, recorded at M & I Studios, New York City (December 26–27, 2001)
- David Engelbrecht – assistant engineer
- Don Sickler – producer
- Roy Gumpel – photography
- Joe Fields – executive producer
- Junko Mayumi – design
- James Isaacs – liner notes
