= List of HIV-positive television characters =

HIV-positive characters from television shows or made-for-television movie martin.

Year(s)	Title	Network	Character	Actor	Notes
1985	An Early Frost	NBC	Michael Pierson	Aidan Quinn	The first made-for-television film to address people with AIDS.
1986	St. Elsewhere	NBC	Dr. Robert Caldwell	Mark Harmon	In "Family Feud" (aired January 29, 1986), Dr. Caldwell was diagnosed with HIV; after leaving the hospital his former colleagues are informed of his death in season six.
1986	Mr. Belvedere	ABC	Danny O'Neill	Ina Fried	"Wesley's friend" (aired January 31, 1986) is the first episode of a prime time TV sitcom to feature a character with AIDS. In the episode, a classmate of Wesley's is pulled out of school after contracting HIV from a blood transfusion. The episode is similar to the real-life story of Ryan White, the Indiana teenager who successfully sued his school when he was expelled for contracting HIV from a blood transfusion.
1986	Hill Street Blues	NBC	Eddie Gregg	Charles Levin	In "Slum Enchanted Evening" (aired March 27, 1986), Belker meets an old informant, Eddie Gregg, a gay male sex worker, who is dying of AIDS.
1987–1989	All My Children	ABC	Cindy Parker	Ellen Wheeler	Controversy was prompted in 1987 with the arrival of Cindy Parker (Ellen Wheeler), who would later fall in love with Stuart. The character was revealed to have AIDS. Through visits by now-Dr. Angie Hubbard, the show educated the public on how the disease was spread and how to prevent it. Cindy had contracted HIV from her husband, Fred, played by Mark Morrison who contracted it from sharing needles for drug use. Cindy is attacked by a vigilante hate group led by her niece, Skye Chandler. The tragedy of the attack shows the extremes of violence that occur every day to individuals with the disease. Cindy marries Stuart and he adopts her son, Scott. She dies early in 1989 in one of the show's most watched episodes.
1987	Another World	NBC	Dawn Rollo	Barbara Tyson	The first AIDS-related storyline on a daytime soap opera in the United States, Dawn was introduced as the sister of Chad Rollo and a love interest for Scott LaSalle. She soon learned that she had contracted HIV from a blood transfusion, and died of AIDS in 1988.
1987	Designing Women	CBS	Kendall Dobbs	Tony Goldwyn	In "Killing All the Right People", Kendall is a young gay man with AIDS who asks the women to design his funeral.
1987	The Equalizer	CBS	Mickey Robertson	Corey Carrier	Six-year-old boy with AIDS is protected from harassment from his neighbors by the titular character.
1988	Go Toward the Light	CBS	Ben Madison	Joshua Harris	A young couple face the realities of life with their child who is diagnosed with AIDS. The young couple (played by Linda Hamilton and Richard Thomas) try to save their young son from the virus.
1988	Midnight Caller	NBC	Mike Barnes	Richard Cox	In "After It Happened" (1x03, aired December 13, 1988), Mike is a bisexual man who deliberately infects men and women, including Tina and Kelly, with HIV. Ross is Mike's former partner, who Mike abandons when Ross gets sick. The episode was controversial, drawing protests from San Francisco AIDS groups who believed the episode would encourage violence against gay people and people with AIDS. Kay Lenz won an Emmy Award for her portrayal. She reprised her role in 1989's "Someone to Love".
1988	Midnight Caller	NBC	Tina Cassidy	Kay Lenz	In "After It Happened" (1x03, aired December 13, 1988), Mike is a bisexual man who deliberately infects men and women, including Tina and Kelly, with HIV. Ross is Mike's former partner, who Mike abandons when Ross gets sick. The episode was controversial, drawing protests from San Francisco AIDS groups who believed the episode would encourage violence against gay people and people with AIDS. Kay Lenz won an Emmy Award for her portrayal. She reprised her role in 1989's "Someone to Love".
1988	Midnight Caller	NBC	Kelly West	Julia Montgomery	In "After It Happened" (1x03, aired December 13, 1988), Mike is a bisexual man who deliberately infects men and women, including Tina and Kelly, with HIV. Ross is Mike's former partner, who Mike abandons when Ross gets sick. The episode was controversial, drawing protests from San Francisco AIDS groups who believed the episode would encourage violence against gay people and people with AIDS. Kay Lenz won an Emmy Award for her portrayal. She reprised her role in 1989's "Someone to Love".
1988	Midnight Caller	NBC	Ross Parker	J. D. Lewis	In "After It Happened" (1x03, aired December 13, 1988), Mike is a bisexual man who deliberately infects men and women, including Tina and Kelly, with HIV. Ross is Mike's former partner, who Mike abandons when Ross gets sick. The episode was controversial, drawing protests from San Francisco AIDS groups who believed the episode would encourage violence against gay people and people with AIDS. Kay Lenz won an Emmy Award for her portrayal. She reprised her role in 1989's "Someone to Love".
1989–1991	Degrassi High	CBC Television	Dwayne Meyers	Darrin Brown	Heterosexual white male teenager, infected by a summer girlfriend.
1989	The Ryan White Story	ABC	Ryan White	Lukas Haas	Documentary film. 13-year-old haemophiliac who contracted HIV from factor VIII
1990–2003	EastEnders	BBC	Mark Fowler	Todd Carty	Heterosexual male; former runaway who returned to his family after contracting HIV; died of an AIDS-related illness. He was the world's first soap opera character to contract the disease, and also the first to portray an HIV/AIDS character on a major television show outside North America.
1991	Neon Rider	CTV	Walt	Philip Granger	A social worker, he firsts tests HIV-positive in the show's 17th episode, "Saint Walt". At first he has a difficult time with the news, and consumes alcohol excessively to cope. He later begins dating Amanda (Kathe Mazur), although his HIV status puts a strain on their relationship. He comes down with Pneumocystis pneumonia in the episode "Moving On".
1991–1993	Life Goes On	ABC	Jessie	Chad Lowe	White male teenager, infected by girlfriend.
1991	A Different World	NBC	Josie Webb	Tisha Campbell	African-American college student infected by her high school boyfriend.
1991	thirtysomething	ABC	Peter Montefiore	Peter Frechette	Gay male, infected by one of his partners
1992	Something to Live for: The Alison Gertz Story	ABC	Alison Gertz	Molly Ringwald	Documentary film. Female, infected during a one-night affair
1993	And the Band Played On	HBO	Various		The shows details the original discovery of AIDS and early problems in dealing with the disease
1993–95	General Hospital	ABC	Stone Cates	Michael Sutton	White male teenager
1994	The Real World	MTV	Pedro Zamora		Openly gay, contracted HIV from one of his partners. Zamora became a well-known AIDS educator
1994–present	General Hospital	ABC	Robin Scorpio	Kimberly McCullough	white female teenager, infected by her boyfriend Stone Cates.
1995	Party of Five	Fox	Danny	Zachary Throne	In "Who Cares?" (aired February 15, 1995), Julia commits herself to an unrealistic songwriting deadline with her coffee shop friend, Danny, who is revealed to be HIV-positive, in an effort to make sure he is remembered after he dies of AIDS.
1996	Pacific Drive	Nine Network	Bethany Daniels	Melissa Tkautz	First regular HIV positive character on a TV drama in the world; character is a white model who is infected by her former boyfriend. She learns to live with disease and eventually, combination therapies begin working for her
1996	NYPD Blue	ABC	Ferdinand Holley	Giancarlo Esposito	Appears on episode 3x17 "Hollie and the Blowfish" (aired March 26, 1996); character is a police informant who robs drug dealers and was infected through drug use.
1996	Murder One	ABC	Richard Cross	Stanley Tucci	Cross is an unscrupulous businessman whose imminent death from AIDS leads to an ethical awakening.
1997	Oz	HBO	Various		Men, infected while in prison. HIV positive inmates are isolated in Unit E, a cell block exclusively for HIV positive inmates not allowed to be amongst general inmate population.
1997	In the Gloaming	HBO	Danny	Robert Sean Leonard	Aired April 20, 1997, the directorial debut of Christopher Reeve. Janet and Martin's young adult son Danny, dying of AIDS, returns home for his last months.
1998	Law & Order	NBC	Kenneth "Twist" Stark	Jason Hayes	In the April 1, 1998, episode "Carrier" (8x17), Stark was charged with murder and attempted murder for deliberately infecting women with HIV.
1999	ER	NBC	Jeanie Boulet	Gloria Reuben	African-American female adult, infected by husband.
2001–2005	Queer as Folk	Showtime	Vic Grassi	Jack Wetherall	Vic was Michael Novotney's uncle. Ben was Michael's boyfriend and a college professor. Hunter was a former hustler who became Ben and Michael's foster son.
2001–2005	Queer as Folk	Showtime	Ben Bruckner	Robert Gant	Vic was Michael Novotney's uncle. Ben was Michael's boyfriend and a college professor. Hunter was a former hustler who became Ben and Michael's foster son.
2001–2005	Queer as Folk	Showtime	James "Hunter" Montgomery	Harris Allan	Vic was Michael Novotney's uncle. Ben was Michael's boyfriend and a college professor. Hunter was a former hustler who became Ben and Michael's foster son.
2002	Takalani Sesame	SABC	Kami	Fran Brill (voice)	Five-year-old female puppet. Contracted HIV via tainted blood transfusion. World's first HIV-positive Sesame Street muppet.
2004	Everwood	The WB	Linda Abbott	Marcia Cross	Globe-trotting doctor. Contracted HIV while trying to save a dying boy in Africa.
2005	Commander in Chief	ABC	Vince Taylor	Anthony Azizi	A special White House aide to Mackenzie Allen, the President of the United States. He is blackmailed over his HIV status by members of the opposing political party, and the president initially fires him for not trusting her enough to disclose his status to her. However, she ultimately rehires him and expresses public confidence in his work.
2005	Nip/Tuck	FX	Gina Russo	Jessalyn Gilsig	Sex addict. Had a child before she knew she was infected with the virus but the baby did not contract it. Re-appeared briefly to work as a receptionist at McNamara/Troy but died soon after when she fell off a building.
2005	House	Fox	Kalvin Ryan	Matthew John Armstrong	Homosexual male; demands treatment from House though the team questions whether advanced HIV infection (AIDS) is truly causing his symptoms. Episode 2x07, "Hunting"
2005–2008	Home and Away	Seven Network	Cassie Turner	Sharni Vinson	Cassie contracted HIV after sleeping with her older boyfriend Henk, who had contracted the disease from a drug-addicted former girlfriend.
2007–2009	The Best Years	The N	Lee Campbell	Alan van Sprang	Bisexual Lee owns local hot spot nightclub Colony.
2008–2010	Hollyoaks	Channel 4	Malachy Fisher	Glen Wallace	Heterosexual male; contracted the disease and kept it a secret from girlfriend Mercedes. He told his brother Kris as he may have contracted it from a one-night stand with Merdedes. Mercedes & Malachy were to marry but ended their relationship, a row in the pub saw Mercedes reveal his status to his friends and family. The couple later married, Mercedes was tested and her results came back negative.
2008	South Park	Comedy Central	Eric Cartman	Trey Parker (voice)	In the episode "Tonsil Trouble" (12x01, aired March 12, 2008) Cartman is infected with HIV during a tonsillectomy. When Kyle Broflovski mocks him, Cartman secretly injects him with infected blood to pass on the virus. Both are subsequently cured through injections of money into the bloodstream.
2008	South Park	Comedy Central	Kyle Broflovski	Matt Stone (voice)	In the episode "Tonsil Trouble" (12x01, aired March 12, 2008) Cartman is infected with HIV during a tonsillectomy. When Kyle Broflovski mocks him, Cartman secretly injects him with infected blood to pass on the virus. Both are subsequently cured through injections of money into the bloodstream.
2009	The League	FX	Ted	Adam Brody	Recurring character in the show's fifth season. Other characters actually envy his HIV status, believing it might be the antiretroviral medication that makes him handsomer and more successful both in his career and at fantasy football than most of the rest of them are.
2010–2011	Brothers & Sisters	ABC	Saul Holden	Ron Rifkin	Saul is an older man who comes out as gay in the show's second season, and later tests HIV-positive in the fourth season. In the show's final season he enters a relationship with Jonathan, the man who had unknowingly given him HIV originally.
2010–2011	Brothers & Sisters	ABC	Jonathan Byrold	Richard Chamberlain	Saul is an older man who comes out as gay in the show's second season, and later tests HIV-positive in the fourth season. In the show's final season he enters a relationship with Jonathan, the man who had unknowingly given him HIV originally.
2014–2015	Emmerdale	ITV	Val Pollard	Charlie Hardwick	Heterosexual female; contracted the disease after having a fling in Portugal with a married man, Ian. She kept her status secret from her family, including her husband Eric. After a complaint about HIV was posted on her B&B website, Val announced her HIV to everybody in the pub. The culprit was discovered to be youngster Jacob Gallagher. Val ended her marriage with Eric after realizing that he could not accept her status. They soon reconciled after realising they could not live without each other.
2014	The Normal Heart	HBO	Ned Weeks	Mark Ruffalo	Adaptation of Larry Kramer's play The Normal Heart, considered one of the most important dramatic depictions of the early days of the HIV/AIDS crisis.
2014	The Normal Heart	HBO	Felix Turner	Matt Bomer	Adaptation of Larry Kramer's play The Normal Heart, considered one of the most important dramatic depictions of the early days of the HIV/AIDS crisis.
2014	The Normal Heart	HBO	Craig Donner	Jonathan Groff	Adaptation of Larry Kramer's play The Normal Heart, considered one of the most important dramatic depictions of the early days of the HIV/AIDS crisis.
2014	The Normal Heart	HBO	Albert	Finn Wittrock	Adaptation of Larry Kramer's play The Normal Heart, considered one of the most important dramatic depictions of the early days of the HIV/AIDS crisis.
2014	The Normal Heart	HBO	Sanford	Stephen Spinella	Adaptation of Larry Kramer's play The Normal Heart, considered one of the most important dramatic depictions of the early days of the HIV/AIDS crisis.
2014–2017	Transparent	Amazon Studios	Shea	Trace Lysette	Shea is known on the series as a yoga instructor and the friend who teaches Maura how to say "Yas queen!" She has a brief fling with Josh in season three, but has not returned to the series since that. Davina continues to make recurring appearances on the series. She is a friend of Maura's and contracted HIV when pre-transition from an older man.
2014–2017	Transparent	Amazon Studios	Davina	Alexandra Billings	Shea is known on the series as a yoga instructor and the friend who teaches Maura how to say "Yas queen!" She has a brief fling with Josh in season three, but has not returned to the series since that. Davina continues to make recurring appearances on the series. She is a friend of Maura's and contracted HIV when pre-transition from an older man.
2015	Looking	HBO	Eddie	Daniel Franzese	Bear who works in a homeless shelter for LGBT youth.
2015–2020	How to Get Away with Murder	ABC	Oliver Hampton	Conrad Ricamora	After insisting that he and his boyfriend, Connor Walsh, get tested, Oliver finds out that he is HIV positive.
2018–2021	Pose	FX	Blanca Evangelista	Mj Rodriguez	The second scene of the show (in episode 1x01) sees Blanca being diagnosed with HIV, causing her to set up her own House.
2018–2021	Pose	FX	Tony	Glamo	Tony, a former student at the dance school, dies of AIDS in hospital in episode 1x03.
2018–2021	Pose	FX	Costas	Johnny Sibilly	Costas, boyfriend of Billy Porter's Pray Tell, is dying of AIDS in hospital; we see him in episodes 1x03 and 1x05.
2018–2021	Pose	FX	Pray Tell	Billy Porter	When Pray Tell takes all the children of House Evangelista to get tested (in episode 1x04), he discovers he is HIV positive.
2021	It's a Sin	Channel 4	Ritchie Tozer	Olly Alexander	It's a Sin is a drama about the HIV/AIDS crisis as it occurred in 1980s Britain. For the sake of brevity, only characters which received top cast billing are included here.
2021	It's a Sin	Channel 4	Colin Morris-Jones	Callum Scott Howells	It's a Sin is a drama about the HIV/AIDS crisis as it occurred in 1980s Britain. For the sake of brevity, only characters which received top cast billing are included here.
2021	It's a Sin	Channel 4	Henry Coltrane	Neil Patrick Harris	It's a Sin is a drama about the HIV/AIDS crisis as it occurred in 1980s Britain. For the sake of brevity, only characters which received top cast billing are included here.
2021	It's a Sin	Channel 4	Various other characters		It's a Sin is a drama about the HIV/AIDS crisis as it occurred in 1980s Britain. For the sake of brevity, only characters which received top cast billing are included here.
2021–present	EastEnders	BBC	Zack Hudson	James Farrar	Heterosexual male; contracts HIV from sharing needles whilst taking steroids.
2021–2024	Doctors	BBC One	Luca McIntyre	Ross McLaren	A HIV-positive nurse who admits his condition to a patient who is worried about dying from the condition. The patient posts about Luca's HIV online and he receives trolling and protests from people who believe he will transmit HIV to patients.
