= Lie with Me =

Lie with Me may refer to:

- Lie with Me (2005 film), a Canadian movie
- Lie with Me (2004 TV series), a British television crime drama series
- Lie with Me (2021 TV series), an Australian/British television thriller drama series
- Lie with Me (novel), a 2017 novel by Philippe Besson
- Lie with Me (2022 film), adaptation of Besson's novel
