= Son frère =

His Brother may refer to:

- His Brother (novel), or Son frère, a novel by Philippe Besson
- His Brother (film), or Son frère, a 2003 French film based on the novel
