= David Blink =

- Born: Oakland, CA
- Genres: Afro-Cuban jazz, salsa, Meditation music, Free improvisation, Electroacoustic music
- Occupation(s): Musician, composer, teacher
- Instrument(s): Trumpet, Handpan, Banjo uke, washboard

David Blink is the director of the College of the Siskiyous Concert and Jazz bands. He plays the trumpet, and is also a composer.

David Blink got his Bachelor's degree in Applied Music with an emphasis in Jazz from the University of Nevada, Las Vegas, and his Master's degree in Music Composition from Central Washington University.

In 2015, David Blink moved to Morelia, Mexico where he formed a new Big band at the Conservatorio de Las Rosas, which became known as the Conservatorio de las Rosas Latin Jazz Orchestra.

David Blink has been a featured artist at the Festival Internacional de Música de Morelia. He created large ensemble arrangements of the famous jazz artist Eugenio Toussaint. As a electroacoustic musician and composer, he has been a featured artist at the Visiones Sonoras XI, and a visiting artist at CMMAS.

David Blink was the Yakima Valley Community College director of instrumental music and jazz studies for over ten years. While there, he also directed the Yakima Valley Community College Salsa Band. Under his direction, the YVCC Salsa Band released a CD of original music: Black Salsify. Blink is the organizer of the Yakima Valley Community College Latin Music Festival, a yearly celebration that began in 2007. The Latin Music Festival has a community-outreach portion. Professional musicians, such as Memo Acevedo from various parts of the United States teach students of all ages in Yakima and the surrounding region about music.
