= In the Absence of Men =

2001 novel by Philippe Besson

- Author: Philippe Besson
- Translator: Frank Wynne
- Language: French
- Genre: Novel
- Published: 2001
- Publisher: Éditions Julliard, Carroll & Graf
- Publication date: 2001
- Publication place: France
- English publication date: 2003
- Pages: 198
- Award: Prix Emmanuel-Roblès
- ISBN: 978-0-7867-1161-1

In the Absence of Men is a novel by Philippe Besson published originally in French by Éditions Julliard in 2001. Besson's first novel, it won the Prix Emmanuel Roblès.

== Plot ==
The novel is divided into three parts. In part one, during the summer of 1916, a French teenager named Vincent de l'Etoile experiences an intense love with a soldier named Arthur Vales who is on leave from the French front of World War I. During this time of extreme tension, the romance becomes a respite for both. Vincent also befriends a well-known French author, Marcel. The second part of the novel is a series of letters between Vincent and Arthur, and Vincent and Marcel.

== Publication history ==
The first novel by Besson, he had to send the manuscript to seven or eight publishers eventually settling on the publisher Julliard. An English translation was published in 2003.

== Awards and recognition ==
In 2001 the French edition of the novel won the Prix Emmanuel-Roblès and the first winner of Prix premier Roman de Culture et bibliothèques pour tous de la Sarthe. The English translation received reviews from several publications including Kirkus Reviews, and the Washington Post.
