= Allen Mezquida =

Allen Mezquida is an illustrator, animator, jazz saxophonist and the founder of The Jazz Dive, an independent art studio at the intersection of jazz and mid-century modern design. The Jazz Dive sells original Jazz Art including fine art prints and canvas prints.

== Biography ==
Mezquida is a jazz alto saxophonist. He was a regular figure in the '80s and '90s New York City jazz scene, playing alongside notable musicians such as Brad Mehldau, Bill Charlap, Roy Hargrove, as well as jazz legends Gerry Mulligan and Dizzy Gillespie. Mezquida recorded one album as leader – A Good Thing, which was released by Koch in 1996. His quartet for the album was Bill Mays or Brad Mehldau on piano, bassist Sean Smith, and drummer Leon Parker. In the late 1990s, Mezquida decided to try something else: he later commented that "I was feeling under appreciated", and "I was more frustrated with jazz's tiny place in the current cultural landscape than with my jazz career".

He then drew cartoons and took up animation. After moving to Los Angeles, he got work for major film studios. He later started a YouTube channel for his animated creation, Smigly, "a short cartoon about a really bitter saxophonist.”

Mezquida played saxophone on Molly Ringwald's Except Sometimes.

During the 2020 quarantine, unable to perform live, Mezquida channeled his creativity into visual art, producing a series of portraits of his favorite jazz musicians. “I’ve always been involved in making art while playing jazz, but during quarantine, I went at it like a madman. I’m still going strong even now,” he said.

== Discography ==
=== As leader ===
A Good Thing (Koch)

== As sideman ==
With Cow Bop (Bruce Forman)

- Too Hick for the Room (B4Man)

With Mark Murphy

- Links (HighNote)
- Some Time Ago (HighNote)

With Molly Ringwald

- Except Sometimes (Concord)

With Sean Smith

- Sean Smith Quartet Live! (Chiaroscuro)
