= Lie with Me (novel) =

2017 novel by Philippe Besson

- Cover for the original French edition
- Author: Philippe Besson
- Translator: Molly Ringwald
- Language: French
- Genre: Romance
- Publisher: Julliard (France); Penguin Random House (United States)
- Publication date: 5 January 2017 (France); 5 September 2019 (U.S.)
- Publication place: France
- Pages: 190 (original edition); 160 pages (English edition)
- ISBN: 2260029884

Lie with Me (French: Arrête avec tes mensonges, lit. 'Stop with Your Lies') is a novel by French writer Philippe Besson. It was published in 2017 to critical acclaim, and became a bestseller in France. It was translated into English by Molly Ringwald under the title Lie with Me and was lauded by English-language reviewers.

== Plot ==
Set in 1984 in the rural French town of Barbezieux, the novel recounts the teenage love affair between the narrator and his schoolmate, Thomas Andrieu.

== Writing ==
Besson, in a piece published in January 2020, noted the influence of The Lover by Marguerite Duras on Lie with Me:

When I threw myself into writing Lie with Me, I placed [The Lover] in front of me. I knew I was going to write about my seventeen-year-old self, about what happened the year I turned seventeen, and I have never forgotten that was the year I read The Lover. I understood that I was going to call forth my memories, that I was going to write about the memory of adolescence, like Duras.

== Reception ==
The novel became a bestseller in France. The novel won the Prix Psychologies du Roman inspiran and the Prix Maison de la Presse. The novel was a finalist for the Prix Orange du Livre.

== Film adaptation ==
The novel was adapted into a film of the same name, which premiered at the Angoulême Francophone Film Festival on 27 August 2022. It was also adapted into a play performed in January 2023 at the Théâtre de la Tempête in Paris.

== Censorship ==
In April 2025, the Lukashenko regime added the book to the "list of printed publications containing information, messages, and materials, the distribution of which could harm the national interests of Belarus".
