= Schimke =

Schimke is a surname. Notable people with the surname include:

- Jana Schimke (born 1979), German politician (CDU)
- Karin Schimke (born 1968), South African writer
- Peter Schimke (1960–2020), American piano player, songwriter, composer, session musician and producer
- Robert Schimke (1932–2014), American biochemist
