= Lee Musiker =

American musician

Lee Musiker (born May 26, 1956) is an American jazz pianist, arranger, orchestrator and conductor.

== Biography ==
Born in New York City in 1956, Mr. Musiker studied music theory and piano at the Manhattan School of Music, the Eastman School of Music and took further training at the Juilliard School. Music Director for Maureen McGovern, Jerry Lewis, Tony Bennett and others, Musiker is also responsible for recording the now infamous Buddy Rich Tapes. Musiker recorded Rich's angry outbursts to his band members by concealing a Walkman in his clothing while on tour with Rich on the early 1980s. The recordings had long circulated in bootleg form and can now be found on the internet.

== Discography ==
=== As sideman ===
With Susannah McCorkle

- Sabia (Concord Records, 1990)

With Mark Murphy

- Some Time Ago (HighNote, 2000)
- Links (HighNote 2001)
- Lucky to Be Me (HighNote 2002)

With Buddy Rich

- The Magic of Buddy Rich (HMC Records, 1984)
