= Irv Williams =

American saxophonist and composer (1919–2019)

- Born: Irvin Williams; August 17, 1919
- Died: December 14, 2019 (aged 100) Saint Paul, Minnesota
- Genres: Jazz; swing; blues
- Occupations: Saxophonist; composer
- Years active: 1925–2019

Irvin Williams (August 17, 1919 – December 14, 2019) was an American jazz saxophonist and composer. Throughout his nine-decade career, Williams focused on the Great American Songbook and the tenor sax as a solo vehicle.

== Musical history ==
His first instrument was the violin before switching to the clarinet and then to the tenor saxophone.

In 1942 Williams moved to Saint Paul (Minnesota). In his early career, he played in bands behind Ella Fitzgerald, Fletcher Henderson, Mary Lou Williams, and Billy Eckstine at venues such as the Apollo Theater or the Howard Theater. Turning down invitations to go on tour with Duke Ellington, Count Basie, or Louis Armstrong, he chose to stay and become part of the Minneapolis–Saint Paul (Twin Cities), history. While teaching in various public schools in St. Paul, he played with the late Reginald Buckner. In the Twin Cities, Williams has played at every jazz venue, past and present, including the old Flame Bar where he was often back to back with such stars as Sarah Vaughan, Dizzy Gillespie, and Johnny Hodges.

Since his 84th birthday, Williams came up with a stream of releases: That’s All (2004), Dedicated to You (2005), followed by one of his most acclaimed, Duo (2006) with piano partner Peter Schimke, and Finality (2008). In 2011, Williams recorded Duke's Mixture, a quintet with Peter Schimke, Steve Blons, Billy Peterson and Jay Epstein; the set list includes five original compositions from Williams and his vocal debut on "Until the Real Thing Comes Along", together with two Irving Berlin standards and a pair of blues tunes.

Irv Williams had a regular weekly gig at the Dakota Jazz Club in downtown Minneapolis.

== Personal life ==
Williams had nine children from two marriages.

== Honors and awards ==
- 1984 – First jazz musician to be honored by the State of Minnesota with his own "Irv Williams Day".
- 1990 – Picture appeared on the "Celebrate Minnesota" official state map
- 1995 – Named an Arts Midwest Jazz Master
- 2005 – At the KBEM Winter Jazz Festival, Irv was one of three recipients of Lifetime Achievement Awards.
- 2010 – Appeared on the cover of Saint Paul Almanac
- Inducted into the Minnesota Jazz Hall of Fame
- His former saxophone has been integrated into the "Minnesota’s Greatest Generation" exhibit at the Minnesota History Center

== Discography ==
- Keep the Music Playing (1994)
- Peace, with Strings (1996)
- STOP Look and Listen (2000)
- Encore (2001)
- That’s All (2004)
- Dedicated To You CD (2005)
- Duo - Irv Williams and Peter Schimke (2006)
- Finality (2008)
- Duke’s Mixture (2011)
- Then Was Then, Now Is Now (2014)
- Pinnacle - Irv Williams Trio (2015)

== Filmography ==
- 2012 – featured in Arts and the Mind, a documentary on PBS
- 2012 – The Funkytown Movie, music documentary by Megabien Entertainment
