= Pinnacle (album) =

Studio album by Irv Williams Trio
- Released: July 6, 2015
- Genre: Jazz
- Label: Ding Dong Music
- Producer: Billy Peterson, Steve Wiese, Steve Blons

Irv Williams Trio chronology
Then Was Then, Now Is Now (2014)	Pinnacle (2015)

Pinnacle is the first album that Irv Williams released not under his own name but as the Irv Williams Trio, on which Irv Williams on tenor saxophone is joined by long-time partner Billy Peterson on bass and Steve Blons on guitar. Its official release date is July 6, 2015 (see 2015 in music).

The Special Edition of Pinnacle consists of 13 musical tracks and highlights of an exclusive conversation, split into six segments, between the jazz saxophonist and late jazz broadcaster Leigh Kamman, whose career spanned over six decades conducting thousands of interviews with the “jazz who’s who”. This historic conversation gives insight into some rare musical history and a few funny stories. This conversation became Kamman´s last recorded interview, as he died away in October 2014.

== Track listing (Special Edition) ==
1. "Conversation – the Pinnacle Band " – 4:44
  - (Kamman, Williams)
2. "Speak Low" – 5:56
  - (Kurt Weill, Ogden Nash; Chappell & Co., Hampshire House Publishing)
3. "I Let a Song Go Out of My Heart" – 4:27
  - (Duke Ellington, Irving Mills, Harry Nemo, John Redmond; EMI Mills Music Inc., Sony/ATV Harmony)
4. "Conversation – George Hudson, Ella & St. Louis" – 3:04
  - (Kamman, Williams)
5. "Another Little Groovy Tune" – 4:12
  - (Irv Williams; Ding Dong Music)
6. "Them There Eyes" – 2:51
  - (Maceo Pinkard, Doris Tauber, William Tracey; Bourne Co.)
7. "Conversation – Teaching Jr. High School " – 2:31
  - (Kamman, Williams)
8. "Memories of You" – 3:48
  - (Eubie Blake, Andy Razaf; Shapiro Bernstein & Co. Inc., Wixen Music OBO, Razaf Music Co.)
9. "Baubles, Bangles & Beads" – 4:53
  - (Robert Wright, George Forrest; Scheffel Music Co.)
10. "Get Out of Town" – 4:55
  - (Cole Porter; Chappell & Co.)
11. "While We're Young" – 5:54
  - (Alec Wilder, Morty Palitz, Bill Engvick; Ludlow Music Inc.)
12. "Conversation – Jimmy Lunceford Band" – 2:16
  - (Kamman, Williams)
13. "These Foolish Things (Remind Me of You)" – 3:14
  - (Jack Strachey, Holt Marvel; Bourne Co.)
14. "I Concentrate on You" – 4:01
  - (Cole Porter; Chappell & Co.)
15. "You Stepped Out of a Dream" – 5:08
  - (Nacio Herb Brown, Gus Kahn; EMI Feist Catalog Inc.)
16. "Conversation – Count Basie" – 1:30
  - (Kamman, Williams, Wiese)
17. "Spring Can Really Hang You Up the Most" – 3:45
  - (Tommy Wolf, Fran Landesman; Fricon Music Co. OBO, Wolfland)
18. "Conversation – Mack the Knife & Ella, Horace Henderson “Find A Note”" – 4:01
  - (Kamman, Williams, Blons, Wiese)
19. "Lush Life" – 2:46
  - (Billy Strayhorn; Campbell Connelly & Co.)

== Personnel ==
- Irv Williams - tenor saxophone
- Billy Peterson - bass
- Steve Blons - guitar
- Steve Wiese, Billy Peterson, Steve Blons - producers
- Steve Wiese, Miles Hanson - engineers
- Monika Hurka - layout, graphic design
- Monika Hurka, Jim Vasquez, Andrea Canter - Photography
