= Julien de Saint Jean =

French actor (born 2001)

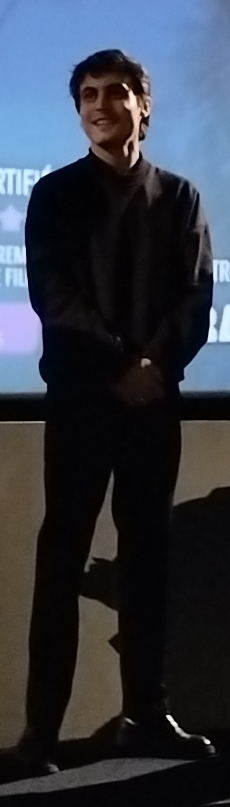
Saint Jean in 2025

Julien de Saint Jean (born 2001) is a French actor.

He grew up in Saint-Julien, near Lyon, and studied from age 15 at the Lyon Regional Conservatoire, where he met his future co-star of Lie with Me (2022), Jérémy Gillet. Saint Jean began his career in theatre.

== Filmography ==
- À propos de nous (short film, 2021)
- Mise à nu (TV, 2021)
- Emma Bovary (TV, 2021)
- Lie with Me (2022)
- The Lost Boys (2023)
- L'écho du lac (short film, 2023)
- The Count of Monte Cristo (2024)
- La piqûre (short film, 2024)
- La réparation (2024)
- Delicious (2025)
- Love Me Tender (2025)
- The Seduction (TV, 2025)
- Stay (feature film, 2026)
