= Panio Gianopoulos =

American author and editor (born 1975)

- Born: July 7, 1975 (age 51)
- Occupations: Author, editor
- Spouse: Molly Ringwald (m. 2007)
- Children: 3

Panio Gianopoulos (born July 7, 1975) is an American author and editor.

== Career ==
Panio Gianopoulos is the author of How to Get Into Our House and Where We Keep the Money, a short story collection about men and women struggling to find and keep love; Kirkus Reviews praised the stories for their humor and insights, calling the book "[w]itty, discerning, and laugh-out-loud funny.”

His stories, essays, and poetry have appeared in various magazines and newspapers, including Tin House, Salon, Northwest Review, The Rattling Wall, Chicago Quarterly Review, Big Fiction, The Brooklyn Rail, Catamaran Literary Reader, and The Los Angeles Review of Books. A recipient of a New York Foundation for the Arts Award for Non-Fiction, Gianopoulos has been included in the anthologies The Bastard on the Couch, Cooking and Stealing: The Tin House Non-Fiction Reader, and "The Encyclopedia of Exes". A former book editor, he has worked at Crown Publishing, Talk Miramax Books, Bloomsbury Publishing, and Backlit Fiction.

== Personal life ==
He has been married to the actress Molly Ringwald since 2007. They have three children, a daughter and boy-girl twins.

== Bibliography ==
- A Familiar Beast, Nouvella (2012)
- How to Get Into Our House and Where We Keep the Money, Four Way Books (2017)
