= Philippe Besson =

French writer (born 1967)

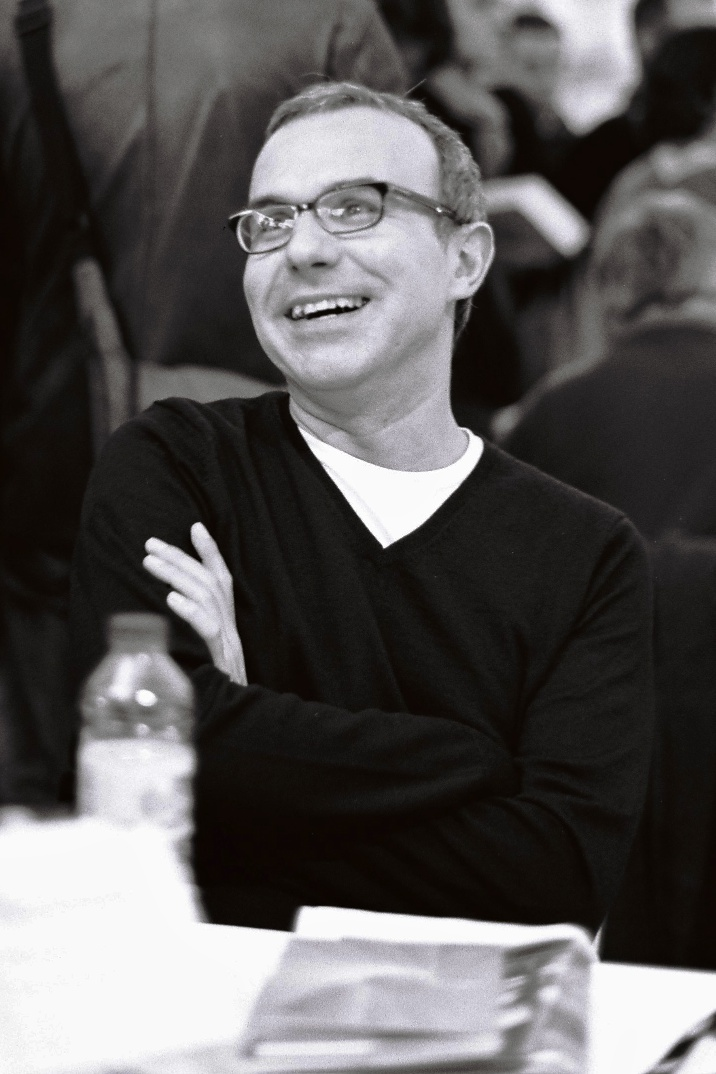
- Besson at Radio France
- Born: 29 January 1967 (age 59); Barbezieux-Saint-Hilaire, Charente, France
- Education: Ecole Supérieure de Commerce de Rouen
- Occupations: Author; Screenwriter
- Writing career
- Language: French
- Subjects: Fiction; Novel; Theater
- Notable works: In the Absence of Men; His Brother; Lie with Me
- Notable awards: Prix Emmanuel Roblès; Prix Maison de la Presse

Philippe Besson (born 29 January 1967) is a French writer, playwright and screenwriter. Besson was born in Barbezieux-Saint-Hilaire, Charente, and has written a total of 23 novels, several of which have been adapted for cinema or theater.

== Life ==
Besson grew up the child of schoolteacher father and a notary clerk mother. Besson was often mocked by his classmates because of his appearance, his clothes and his manners. During his final school year, he fell in love with a peasant's son in his village in Charente, but they were forced to hide their relationship. Besson attended l'École supérieure de commerce de Rouen, now called Neoma Business School.

In 1999, Besson, a law graduate, was inspired to write his first novel, En l'absence des hommes, while reading of accounts of ex-servicemen during the First World War. The novel won the Prix Emmanuel Roblès. Besson's second novel, Son Frère was shortlisted for the Prix Femina, and adapted for cinema by Patrice Chéreau in 2003. The film was well received and won the Silver Bear at the Berlin Film Festival.

Besson's novel Arrête avec tes mensonges (published in English under the title Lie with Me) received critical acclaim, became a bestseller in France, and won several awards including the Prix Maison de la Presse and Prix Psychologies du roman inspirant. The book was adapted in 2022 into a movie of the same name, which premiered in the Angoulême Francophone Film Festival on August 27, 2022. The novel was also adapted into a play performed in January 2023 at the Théâtre de la Tempête in Paris.

== Major works ==
- En l'absence des hommes, Éditions Julliard, 2001, ISBN 9782260015642
  - In the Absence of Men, translated by Frank Wynne, Heinemann 2003, Carroll & Graf, 2003, ISBN 978-0-7867-1161-1
- Son frère, Julliard, 2001, ISBN 978-2-260-01586-4
  - His Brother, translated by Frank Wynne, Heinemann, 2004, ISBN 978-0-434-01211-4
- L'arrière saison, Julliard, 2002, ISBN 978-2-260-01610-6 (inspired by Edward Hopper's painting Nighthawks)
- Un garçon d'Italie, Julliard, 2003, ISBN 978-2-260-01642-7 (which was shortlisted for both the Prix Goncourt and the Prix Médicis.)
- Les Jours fragiles, Julliard, 2004, ISBN 978-2-260-01641-0 (focussing on the last days of Rimbaud, it has been optioned by François Dupeyron for the cinema.)
- Un instant d'abandon: roman, Julliard, 2005, ISBN 978-2-260-01681-6
- Se résoudre aux adieux: roman, Julliard, 2007, ISBN 978-2-260-01726-4
  - The Accidental Man
- Arrête avec tes mensonges, Éditions Julliard, 2017, ISBN 9782260029885
  - Lie with Me, translated by Molly Ringwald, Scribner, 2019, ISBN 9780241987094
- Un Personnage de Roman - Macron par Besson, French and European Publications Inc, 2017, ISBN 978-1547902231
