= A Good Thing (album) =

Studio album by Allen Mezquida
- Released: 1996 (CD)
- Genre: Jazz
- Label: Koch

A Good Thing is an album by jazz alto saxophonist Allen Mezquida.

== Music and recording ==
One of the tracks is a Mezquida original. The album was released on CD by Koch in 1996.

== Reception ==
The AllMusic reviewer stated that Mezquida "has a thoughtful and lightly swinging style while displaying a great deal of inner tension."

Disillusioned with jazz, Mezquida subsequently turned to drawing cartoons.

Professional ratings
Review scores
Source	Rating
AllMusic	4/5 stars

== Track listing ==
1. "Rip Van Winkle"
2. "Revelation"
3. "The Way You Look Tonight"
4. "Tears"
5. "Father Flanagan"
6. "Waltzin' Gold"
7. "A Good Thing"
8. "Ballad for the Carpenter"

== Personnel ==
- Allen Mezquida – alto sax
- Bill Mays – piano
- Brad Mehldau – piano
- Sean Smith – bass
- Leon Parker – drums
