= When It Happens to You: A Novel in Stories =

2012 novel by Molly Ringwald

- First edition
- Author: Molly Ringwald
- Language: English
- Genre: Young adult
- Publisher: It Books
- Publication date: 2012
- Media type: Print (hardback & paperback)
- ISBN: 0-06-180946-2

When It Happens to You: A Novel in Stories is a young adult novel written by American actress Molly Ringwald.

== Summary ==
The novel is centered on a couple named Phillip and Greta, whose marriage is in trouble.
