= Except Sometimes =

Studio album by Molly Ringwald
- Released: April 9, 2013
- Recorded: 2012–13
- Genre: Jazz, pop
- Length: 43:18
- Label: Concord Records
- Producer: Peter Smith

Molly Ringwald chronology
Except Sometimes (2013)	Going Home Alone (2013)

Except Sometimes is the debut studio album of American singer-songwriter Molly Ringwald released on April 9, 2013, through Concord Records. It is a jazz record that follows a tradition of the Ringwald family set by her father. "I grew up in a home filled with music and had an early appreciation of jazz since my dad was a jazz musician (pianist Bob Ringwald). Beginning at around age three I started singing with his band and jazz music has continued to be one of my three passions along with acting and writing. I like to say jazz music is my musical equivalent of comfort food. It's always where I go back to when I want to feel grounded," Ringwald said in a statement. The album received generally mixed to positive reviews, with many critics praising Ringwald's vocals. The closing track of the album is a cover version of Simple Minds' "Don't You (Forget About Me)" which was part of the soundtrack of the movie The Breakfast Club that starred Ringwald. Ringwald dedicated this track "to the memory of J.H." This refers to John Hughes, Ringwald's director in The Breakfast Club and many of her other films.

== Background and release ==
Long before she became known as a Golden Globe-nominated actress, Ringwald was singing. She started performing with her pianist father’s jazz band when she was three and has never stopped. Ringwald recorded Except Sometimes with Peter Smith (who also produced), on piano, Clayton Cameron on drums, Allen Mezquida on alto saxophone, and Trevor Ware on bass. Together, they put a new spin on such jazz and musical standards as "The Very Thought of You", "I Get Along Without You Very Well (Except Sometimes)", "I'll Take Romance", "Sooner or Later", and "Where Is Love". "It was really hard to narrow it down", Ringwald said, of selecting the album's 10 tracks. "It was basically songs that I felt connected to and songs that I felt we played together well as a band. As much as I love traditional jazz, my real interest is more modern, more from the Great American Song Book." The album was released on April 9, 2013.

== Development ==
Ringwald has always wanted to release an album, but during the beginning of her career she felt the time wasn't right to release an album, as she felt no one would have been interested in the type of music she wanted to sing, so she decided to just focus on acting. She was cast in Tempest, and for the next few decades, her public focus was on acting, as she starred in such films as Fresh Horses, Betsy's Wedding, King Lear, The Pick-Up Artist, and, of course, her trio of films with John Hughes, Sixteen Candles, The Breakfast Club and Pretty In Pink. "Once I started to act I felt like I had to make that decision," she says. Plus, during the '80s, "I didn't think there was a place for the music that I was interested in," she says. "There was no Madeline Peyroux, Diana Krall, Norah Jones… I didn't feel like anybody was going to listen to the kind of music that I wanted to sing. I thought, I'll just keep singing with my dad and focus on my acting." She later began to work on her debut album in early 2012 with an intended 2013 release date. She felt people would have interest in her music at this time of her career and wanted to experiment with jazz music as that's what she grew up listening to.

== Musical style and influences ==
Speaking of the album's influences, Ringwald said, "I had quite the musical repertoire; it was pretty much traditional jazz but there was some Bessie Smith and Helen Kane, the original Betty Boop." Inspirations for the album also included Ella Fitzgerald, Blossom Dearie, and Susannah McCorkle. "Blossom Dearie was the only one I got to see live. Susannah's recordings have really influenced me. I think she was really special in her gifts of interpretation and how much humanity she brought to the songs."

== Critical reception ==
Editors at AllMusic rated this album 2 out of 5 stars, with critic Stephen Thomas Erlewine writing that the album is distinguished from other instances of actors making albums "by a more-adventurous-than-usual selection of songs... and a nicely intimate vibe". The album received generally positive reviews. Jonathan Widran of Music Connection said, "Fans of the '80s teen icon, and skeptics alike, may wonder why she is suddenly turning her artistic attention to jazz, but Molly Ringwald has not only got it in her DNA—her dad, Bob Ringwald, is a notable pianist and bandleader—but she was recording with him long before she began acting. Ringwald lends her cool, sultry vocals and strong instinctive phrasing to a colorful mix of standards, sweetly balancing the playful swing and gentle intimacy with the help of her ensemble of top musicians, led by pianist Peter Smith. Jazz radio has rightly jumped first on her graceful twist on 'Don't You (Forget About Me)', which infectiously blends her past and present and resonates emotionally beyond its inclusion as a nostalgic novelty." In a more mixed review, Ted Scheinman of Slant Magazine said, "On the spectrum of vanity projects, Except Sometimes far outstrips Gwyneth Paltrow's country-western excursions without ever quite achieving the distinction and charm of Zooey Deschanel singing trad jazz over ukuleles. Deschanel punches above her weight, vocally speaking, but Jonathan Lethem once wrote that the secret to good popular singing lies in the proper negotiation between your limitations and your aspirations. Here, it doesn't even feel like Ringwald's punching; her signature tic is to start each line an eighth note or so too late, a technique that feels less effortless than lazy (pregnant pauses do not constitute phrasing). The most self-aware moment is the closing song, a soft-jazz take on 'Don't You (Forget About Me)', the iconic theme song from The Breakfast Club. Reframing the song with a jazz combo highlights the rather dopey lyrics, but that appears to be part of the joke. 'You wouldn't be buying this CD if my name wasn't Molly Ringwald,' is the message—and on this score, at least, she straight-up nails it."

== Track listing ==
Except Sometimes track listing
No.	Title	Writer(s)	Length
1.	"Sooner or Later"	Stephen Sondheim	4:48
2.	"I Get Along Without You Very Well (Except Sometimes)"	Hoagy Carmichael	4:43
3.	"I Believe in You"	Frank Loesser	4:12
4.	"I'll Take Romance"	Oscar Hammerstein II; Ben Oakland	3:56
5.	"The Very Thought of You"	Ray Noble	4:42
6.	"Exactly Like You"	Jimmy McHugh; Dorothy Fields	2:41
7.	"Where Is Love?"	Lionel Bart	4:50
8.	"Pick Yourself Up"	Jerome Kern; Dorothy Fields	2:02
9.	"Ballad of the Sad Young Men"	Thomas J. Wolf Jr.; Frances Landesman	6:30
10.	"Don't You (Forget About Me)"	Keith Forsey; Steve Schiff	4:54
Total length:			43:18

== Charts ==
Chart performance for Except Sometimes
Charts (2013)	Peak position
Heatseekers Albums	21
Jazz Albums	7
Australian Albums Chart	23
