= Lie with Me (2022 film) =

2022 film by Olivier Peyon

- Theatrical release poster
- French: Arrête avec tes mensonges
- Directed by: Olivier Peyon
- Screenplay by: Olivier Peyon; Vincent Poymiro; Arthur Cahn; Cécilia Rouaud
- Based on: Lie with Me by Philippe Besson
- Produced by: Anthony Doncque; Miléna Poylo; Gilles Sacuto
- Starring: Guillaume de Tonquédec; Victor Belmondo; Guilaine Londez; Jérémy Gillet; Julien de Saint Jean
- Cinematography: Martin Rit
- Edited by: Damien Maestraggi
- Music by: Thylacine; Bravinsan
- Production company: TS Productions
- Distributed by: KMBO
- Release dates: 27 August 2022 (FFA); 22 February 2023 (France)
- Running time: 98 minutes
- Country: France
- Language: French
- Budget: €2.1 million ($2.3 million)
- Box office: $636,052

Lie with Me (French: Arrête avec tes mensonges, lit. 'Stop with Your Lies') is a 2022 French romantic drama film co-written and directed by Olivier Peyon, based on the 2017 novel of the same name by Philippe Besson.

== Synopsis ==
In Cognac, France in 1984, schoolboys Stéphane Belcourt and Thomas Andrieu conduct a clandestine love affair. While Thomas initiates their growing friendship, he is conflicted about being gay, and feels obligated to remain in Cognac to take over the family farm.

In the present day, Stéphane, now a famous novelist, agrees to be the guest of honour at a celebration for a famous brand of cognac brandy, Baussony, even though he does not drink alcohol. He returns to his hometown for the first time in 35 years, where he meets Lucas, Thomas's son. Thomas has died the previous year. At first it seems Belcourt was invited by the Baussony owner's wife, but it is later revealed the invitation was Lucas's idea (who has read all of Stéphane's books), alarming Stéphane. Stéphane learns that Thomas left his family and killed himself. Stéphane and Lucas go on an occasionally painful journey of discovery about who Thomas really was and why he did what he did throughout his life.

== Cast ==
- Guillaume de Tonquédec as Stéphane Belcourt
  - Jérémy Gillet as young Stéphane Belcourt
- Victor Belmondo as Lucas Andrieu
- Julien de Saint Jean as Thomas Andrieu
- Guilaine Londez as Gaëlle Flamand
- Pierre-Alain Chapuis as Monsieur Dejean, owner of Baussony

== Reception ==
The film was positively reviewed in The New Statesman.

Two reviews in The Guardian both gave the film 3/5 stars, calling it "handsome but ploddingly predictable".

A review in BFI Sight and Sound called the film "plausible, if a tad indulgent" with "much to appreciate".
