= Éditions Julliard =

French publisher

- Parent company: Editis
- Founded: 1942
- Founder: René Julliard
- Country of origin: France
- Headquarters location: 22 rue du Pont-Neuf 75001 Paris
- Key people: Christian Bourgois; Élisabeth Gille; Vanessa Springora (Director 2019-present); Adrien Bosc (literary director 2024-present)
- Publication types: Books
- Official website: lisez.com/editeurs/julliard

Éditions Julliard is a French publishing house and was founded in 1942 by René Julliard. Julliard was known as a discoverer and publisher of talents, in particular Françoise Sagan and Jean d'Ormesson. After Julliard's death in July 1962, the managing director, Christian Bourgois, took over the publishing house.

== History ==
Éditions Julliard was soon repurchased by the publishing house Presses de la Cité. Christian Bourgois created his own publishing house in 1966.

In 1953, André Frank and Jean-Louis Barrault created the review of the Renaud-Barrault books (Les Cahiers Renaud-Barrault), published at Éditions Julliard until Julliard's death, then at Éditions Gallimard.

Éditions Julliard was revived in 1988, when Christian Bourgois decided to appoint Élisabeth Gille as literary director. They sought out and published new talents, such as Lydie Salvayre and Régine Detambel, but also the great names of Éditions Julliard history, like Françoise Sagan.

Christian Bourgois and Élisabeth Gille left the publishing house at the beginning of 1992, following internal disagreements with the Presses de la Cité. François Bourin was managing director from 1992-1995.

Betty Mialet and Bernard Barrault have acted as managing directors of Éditions Julliard since 1995.

== Published authors since 1995 ==
The list of published authors since 1995 includes:

- Philippe Besson
- Jacques-André Bertrand
- Laurent Bénégui
- Philippe Djian
- Philippe Jaenada - winner of the Prix Femina 2017
- Yasmina Khadra
- Mazarine Pingeot
- Barbara Pravi
- Denis Robert
- Danièle Saint-Bois
- Jean Teulé

== Published authors since 2019 ==
Under the directorship of Vanessa Springora since her appointment in 2019, Editions Julliard has published the following among others:

- Rachid Benzine
- Philippe Besson
- Charlotte Casiraghi - writer of La Fêlure, winner of the Prix Mosanostra 2026, shortlisted for the Prix Fitzgerald 2026, selected for the Prix Philippe Sollers 2026.
- Sarah Chiche
- David Diop
- Irène Frain
- Patrick Grainville
- Julia Kerninon
- Valentin Musso
- Erik Orsenna
- Philippe Pujol
- Abdellah Taïa - winner of the Prix Décembre 2024
