= I Ain't Gonna Let You Break My Heart Again =

Song by Bonnie Raitt

from the album Nick of Time
- Released: March 21, 1989
- Studio: Capitol Studios
- Genre: Americana; rock; blues rock
- Length: 2:38
- Label: Capitol
- Songwriters: David Lasley; Julie Lasley
- Producer: Don Was

Music video
- "I Ain't Gonna Let You Break My Heart Again" on YouTube

"I Ain't Gonna Let You Break My Heart Again" is a song by American blues musician Bonnie Raitt from her Nick of Time album. It was written by David Lasley and Julie Lasley. Raitt sings the song accompanied by Herbie Hancock, playing solo piano. It was produced by Don Was, engineered and mixed by Ed Cherney.

== Background ==
Lasley had persuaded a security guard to give Raitt a cassette with his song "I Ain't Gonna Let You Break My Heart Again", which she took home with her. He related in an interview how sometime later, the tape fell on her head from a box in her closet.

In making the album, Raitt was not concerned with making a commercial album. Her management, the record company and she felt that if she made a record that was artistically true, picking songs that she liked from the heart, it would work. She commented "I waited a long time to be grown-up enough to sing [it]". "Every song on there is about somebody who had to have lived this long." Raitt wasn't concerned with how the songs fit together or that "on the Herbie Hancock one ["I Ain't Gonna Let You Break My Heart Again"] everyone's gonna think I'm tryin' to be too like Linda Ronstadt."

Raitt adamantly said, "If anybody had any doubts about how I feel, they can just listen to those three songs," citing "I Ain't Gonna Let You Break My Heart Again"..."The songs are cathartic and I will be not denied. I will get what I deserve. When you get beat up, you eventually stop taking it.".

== Recording ==
Herbie Hancock was Raitt's first choice to accompany her on piano and he agreed. They recorded the song at Capitol Studio B with Don Was producing and Ed Cherney engineering. Raitt described "I’d never recorded with Herbie before, or done anything that exciting as far as being, “On your mark, get set, go” with one of the great geniuses of forever. It was a very stretching and exciting and hairy and rewarding session." They recorded two takes, the first longer and the second, shorter. "We did a couple takes only, because it's such an emotionally wrenching song."

"The song is just a jewel. I mean every word I sing, and I pick songs where I have to really mean every lyric — and this one I had been meaning for a long time [laughs]. I’d been wanting to record it for at least 15 years." - Bonnie Raitt "The only fixes we had to do on the vocal...are the couple of lines where she started crying while we were doing it" - Don Was

== Composition and style ==
The recording is rootsy and stripped-down, Hancock on piano accompanying Raitt singing a woeful ballad.

== Critical reception ==
Pacific Stars And Stripes cites three titles writing: "Nick of Time contains music worthy of such titles as..."I Ain't Gonna Let You Break My Heart Again". Jeff Turrentine, for the Austin Daily Texan, wrote "even more genuinely soulful are Raitt's torchy, plaintive ballads of lost love...Raitt tells her sad tale as Herbie Hancock provides a lush blanket of chords, and one can almost imagine her reclining atop the Steinway in some smokey barroom." Dick Hogan of the Cedar Rapids Gazette describes "Bonnie spins a tale of woe over Herbie Hancock's lone piano"

== Covers ==
- Louise Setara
- Jane Monheit
