= His Brother (novel) =

2001 novel by Philippe Besson

- Author: Philippe Besson
- Original title: Son frère
- Translator: Frank Wynne
- Language: French
- Genre: Fiction
- Set in: Île de Ré
- Publisher: Julliard
- Publication date: 2001
- Publication place: France
- English publication date: 2004
- Media type: Print
- Pages: 151
- ISBN: 2-260-01586-7
- Dewey Decimal: 843.92

His Brother (French: Son frère) is a novel by Philippe Besson. It was published by Julliard in Paris in 2001. It was later published as a softcover issue.

It was translated into English by Frank Wynne, published in 2004 by Heinemann (ISBN 9780434012114).

== Adaptations ==
In 2003, Patrice Chéreau adapted the text for a feature film of the same name, Son frère (His Brother).
