= Peter Schimke =

American musician (1960–2020)

- Born: Peter Adam Schimke; Minnesota, United States
- Genres: rock; pop; jazz; R&B
- Occupations: Musician; songwriter; composer; producer; actor
- Instrument: piano
- Years active: 1975–February 23, 2020
- Website: peterschimke.com

Peter Schimke was an American piano player, songwriter, composer, session musician and producer. Growing up in a musical environment, Schimke started performing live in his early teens.

== Career ==
Schimke was born in Minneapolis, Minnesota. After sitting in on vocals, keyboards and drums with bands throughout his teens, Schimke's first professional gig was with the New Psychenauts and went on as the lead singer of the Swingin' Combo; both bands formed part of the early Minneapolis rock scene that launched The Replacements and Hüsker Dü. Simultaneously, Schimke began composing for prominent Minneapolis theater companies. At about the same time, he played his first professional rock gig on keyboard with blues harmonica legend Charlie Musselwhite at the Blue Max on Maui. While living in New York, Peter performed at a steady Monday night gig at the Dean Street Café with Craig Bailey of the Ray Charles Band.

Schimke toured, performed and/or recorded with many artists, such as Billy Preston, Sam Moore, Iffy, Likehell, Art Farmer, Tom Harrell, Fareed Haque, Mark Murphy, Frank Morgan, David Friedman, Jose Neto, Mike Gordon, Gregoire Maret (Pat Metheny), Danny Gottlieb, Mark Egan, Emil Richards, Pete Escovedo (Latin Orchestra), Steve Wilson, members of the Wynton Marsalis group (Wes Anderson, Lincoln Goines, Rodney Whitaker), Charlie Persip Big Band, Bill Perkins, Tino D'Geraldo, Jackie Ryan (Ronnie Scott's in London), Julee Cruise of "Twin Peaks" (Warner Brothers American Tour and London Palladium), Billy Peterson, Estaire Godinez, El Buho, Jeff Sipes, Victor Wooten, Rita Coolidge, Tony Joe White, Gonzalo Lasheras.

At the time of his death, Schimke was working on a solo album.

== Discography ==
- Dave Sletten: Black Moon (1994)
- Mark Murphy: Latin Porter (2000)
- DJ Free / Soulfood: Spiritual Massage (2002)
- Soulfood: Serenity (2002)
- Soulfood: Shaman's Way (2002)
- Soulfood: Latino Groove (2002)
- Brent Lewis / Soulfood: Yoga Rhythm (2002)
- Soulfood: Yoga Dream (2003)
- DJ Free / Soulfood: Celestial Meditations (2003)
- Irv Williams: That's All (2004)
- That Band: Springsteel (2004)
- Moodfood and Jadoo with Sevara: Sensan (2005)
- Irv Williams: Dedicated to You (2005)
- DJ Free / Soulfood: Mystic Canyons (2005)
- Moodfood: Ice (2005)
- Enrique Toussaint: Comunidad (2006)
- DJ Free / Brent Lewis / Soulfood: Yoga Groove (2006)
- Irv Williams & Peter Schimke: Duo (2006)
- Dean Evenson: Spa Rhythms (2006)
- Ron Cohen / DJ Free / Soulfood: Cafe Santa Fe (2006)
- Soulfood: Tantric Chill (2006)
- Soulfood: Power Yoga (2006)
- Marcos Casals & Peter Schimke: Santander / Minneapolis (2007)
- Irv Williams: Finality (2007)
- Soulfood: Spascapes (2007)
- Chris Morrissey Quartet: The Morning World (2008)
- Power Music / Soulfood: Buddha Chill (2008)
- Holly Long: Leaving Kansas (2008)
- Chris Morrissey: Morning World (2009)
- Estaire Godinez Band: This Time (2010)
- Irv Williams: Duke's Mixture (2011)
- Mark Murphy: The Latin Porter
- Stuart D’Rozario: Songs About Now
- James Curry: A Brand New Suit
- Varietals: Volume 1
- Iffy: Biota Bondo

for references see cduniverse.com or allmusic.com

== Filmography ==
- Legends Rock, live TV show (2004)
- The Funkytown Movie, music documentary (2012)
