= Alison Gertz =

American AIDS activist (1966–1992)

- Born: Alison L. Gertz; February 27, 1966; New York City, U.S.
- Died: August 8, 1992 (aged 26); Westhampton Beach, New York, U.S.
- Cause of death: AIDS-related pneumonia
- Education: Horace Mann School; Parsons The New School for Design
- Occupation: AIDS activist

Alison L. Gertz (February 27, 1966 – August 8, 1992) was an American AIDS activist in the late 1980s and early 1990s. Gertz died of AIDS-related pneumonia.

== Early life ==
Gertz was born in Manhattan and was raised in an apartment on Park Avenue. She was the only child of Jerrold Gertz, a real estate executive, and his wife Carol, the co-founder (with Adriana Mnuchin, wife of Robert Mnuchin) of a woman's clothing store chain, Tennis Lady. She attended the Horace Mann School, and later studied art at Parsons The New School for Design.

== Diagnosis ==
In summer 1988, Gertz developed a persistent fever and chronic diarrhea. She was hospitalized and underwent testing to determine the cause of her illness. Gertz was never tested for AIDS because doctors did not consider her to be in a "high-risk group" for the disease. Two weeks later, she developed pneumonia. A bronchoscopy revealed that Gertz had AIDS.

Gertz later found out that she had contracted HIV from a 27-year-old man named Cort Brown. He was a bisexual bartender whom Gertz met at Studio 54 when she was 16. They had their only sexual encounter in 1982. He died of AIDS in 1988.

== Activism ==
In 1989, Gertz chose to publicly share her story and did an interview with The New York Times. She hoped to educate others about AIDS and dispel the myths and misconceptions surrounding the disease. She stated:

All the AIDS articles are about homosexuals or poor people on drugs, and unfortunately a lot of people just flip by them. They think it doesn't apply to them. They can't turn the page on me. I could be one of them, or their daughter. They have to deal with this. I want to talk to these kids who think they're immortal. I want to tell them: I'm heterosexual, and it took only one time for me.

She became an AIDS activist, appearing on numerous television shows and also speaking with teenagers on the subject of safe sex. Gertz and her parents also founded The AIDS groups Concerned Parents for AIDS Research and Love Heals. In 1989, Gertz's foundation, Love Heals, along with Martin Himmel Health Foundation, hired Tony Schwartz to create public service announcements on AIDS awareness. The scripts and correspondence are housed at the Library of Congress in the Tony Schwartz Collection. During Gertz's time as an activist, she was voted Woman of the Year by Esquire magazine and received the Secretary's Award for Excellence in Public Service from the United States Department of Health and Human Services.

In March 1992, ABC aired a television movie based on her life, starring Molly Ringwald. In the 24 hours after the movie aired, the federal AIDS hotline received a record 189,251 calls.

== Death ==
On August 8, 1992, Gertz died of AIDS-related pneumonia at her family's summer home in Westhampton Beach, New York, at the age of 26. A memorial service for Gertz was held at the New York Society for Ethical Culture on September 24, 1992, in Manhattan.

== In popular culture ==
Gertz was referred to in the song "Life Support" from the rock musical Rent. At the beginning of the song, various members of the group say their names. Jonathan Larson used the names of his HIV-positive friends as the characters in this song. At the beginning of the song, the character who refers to herself as "Ali" was named after Gertz.

An episode of Beverly Hills 90210 entitled "Isn't It Romantic?" was inspired by Gertz's story.
