= Élisabeth Gille =

Élisabeth Gille (20 May 1937 in Paris – 30 September 1996) was a French translator and writer. She was the younger daughter of the French-Russian-Jewish writer Irène Némirovsky and Michel Epstein. She was the author of Le Mirador (1992), an imaginary biography of her mother. In addition to her book about her mother, she was also the primary editor at the French publishing house, Denoël. She died shortly after her novel, Un pays de cendres, based on the story of her and her sister Denise's survival, was published.
