= Barbezieux-Saint-Hilaire =

- Commune
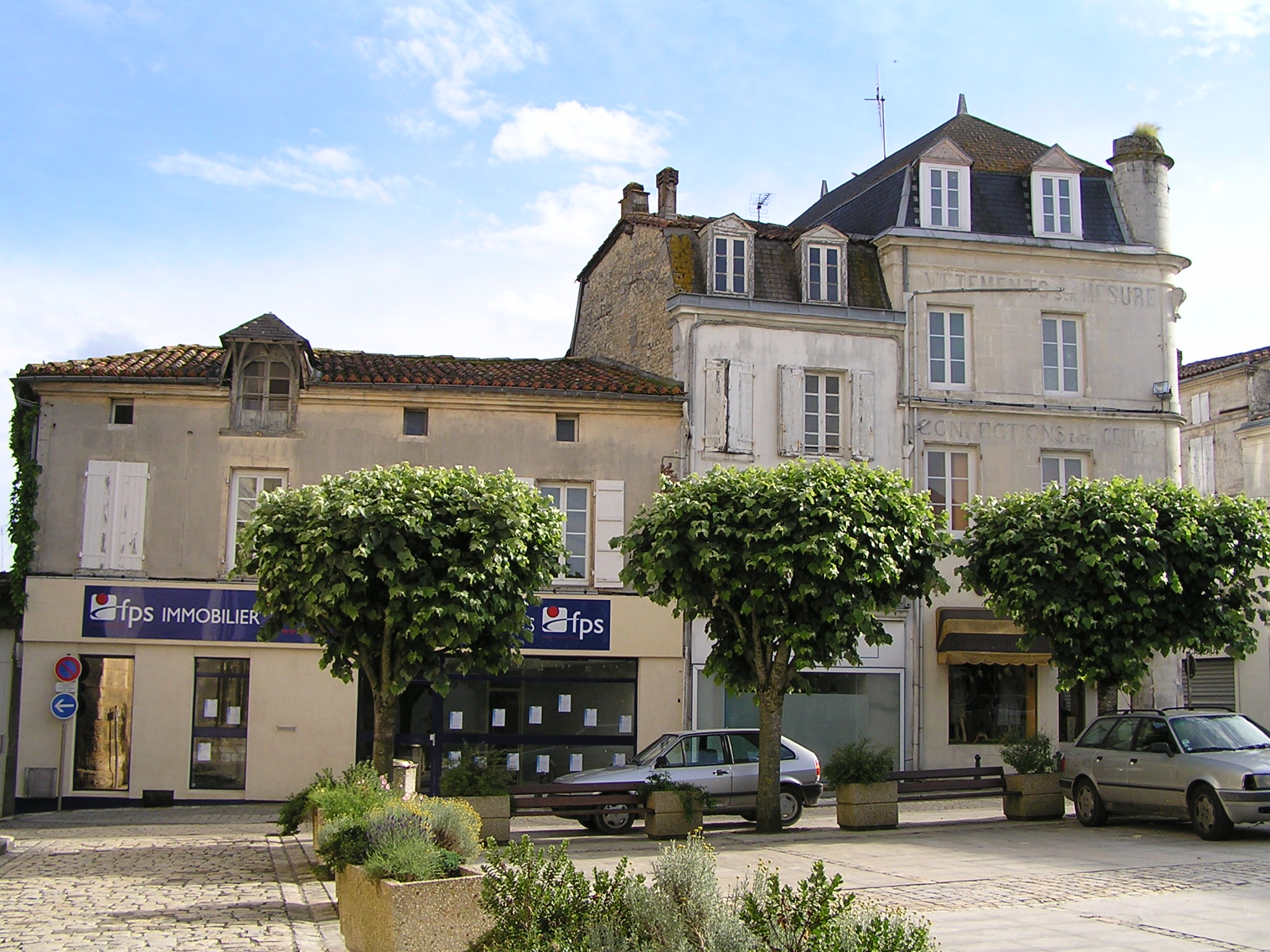
- The church square in Barbezieux

- Coat of arms
- Location of Barbezieux-Saint-Hilaire
- Location within France Location within Nouvelle-Aquitaine
- Coordinates: 45°28′25″N 0°09′15″W
- Country: France
- Region: Nouvelle-Aquitaine
- Department: Charente
- Arrondissement: Cognac
- Canton: Charente-Sud
- Intercommunality: 4B Sud-Charente

Government
  - Mayor (2026–32): Vincent Renaudin
- Area^{1}: 26.55 km^{2} (10.25 sq mi)
- Elevation: 79 m (259 ft)
- Highest elevation: 131 m (430 ft)
- Lowest elevation: 32 m (105 ft)
- Population (2023): 4,726
  - Density: 178.0/km^{2} (461.0/sq mi)
- Time zone: UTC+01:00 (CET)
  - Summer (DST): UTC+02:00 (CEST)
- INSEE/Postal code: 16028 /16300
- ^{1} French Land Register data, which excludes lakes, ponds, glaciers > 1 km^{2} (0.386 sq mi or 247 acres) and river estuaries.

Barbezieux-Saint-Hilaire (French pronunciation: [baʁbəzjø sɛ̃t‿ilɛʁ]) is a commune in the Charente department, Southwestern France. The commune was formed in 1973 by the merger of the former communes Barbezieux and Saint-Hilaire. With about 4,700 inhabitants, it forms the most important town in Southern Charente.

Barbezieux is a fortified hill town on the historic route south west from Paris – Poitiers to Bordeaux – Spain, now served by the N10, which bypasses Barbezieux. The commune is listed as a Village étape. The town rises from narrow streets of unspoilt, typically Charentais buildings to the medieval chateau, which dominates the western approach.

== Population ==
Historical population

Year	Pop.	±% p.a.
1793	2,740	—
1800	1,984	−4.51%
1806	2,452	+3.59%
1821	3,061	+1.49%
1831	2,756	−1.04%
1841	3,335	+1.93%
1846	3,514	+1.05%
1851	3,574	+0.34%
1856	3,700	+0.70%
1861	3,878	+0.94%
1866	3,881	+0.02%
1872	3,910	+0.12%
1876	4,007	+0.61%
1881	4,102	+0.47%
1886	4,090	−0.06%
1891	4,104	+0.07%
1896	4,229	+0.60%
1901	4,080	−0.71%

Year	Pop.	±% p.a.
1906	4,204	+0.60%
1911	4,312	+0.51%
1921	4,106	−0.49%
1926	4,231	+0.60%
1931	4,079	−0.73%
1936	4,243	+0.79%
1946	4,243	+0.00%
1954	4,229	−0.04%
1962	4,546	+0.91%
1968	4,851	+1.09%
1975	5,198	+0.99%
1982	5,103	−0.26%
1990	4,774	−0.83%
1999	4,819	+0.10%
2007	4,645	−0.46%
2012	4,823	+0.75%
2017	4,672	−0.63%
2023	4,726	+0.19%

Source: EHESS and INSEE (1968–2023)

== Wine ==
Barbezieux also forms part of the Petite Champagne area of cognac wine growing, second only to the finest Grande Champagne and is in the heart of the vineyards producing cognac and the local drink Pineau de Charente.

== Services ==
Barbezieux has twice weekly markets; foires and other public entertainments; lido; cinema; sporting and equestrian facilities, a high school, and a hospital.

== Tourism ==
Barbezieux is a centre for touring the South Charente and also a short drive from the coast. For tourists and cyclists following the Chemin de St Jacques to Compostella, the Voie Verte, or Green Way, is the former railway line, running approx 40 km. south from Barbezieux towards Bordeaux. There is accommodation for those wishing to visit the town including a Chambres D'Hôtes in the restored 18th century Maison de Maitre, hosting a fine collection of Modern Art, to be found in Rue de L'Alma in the heart of the old town.

== St Mathias Church ==
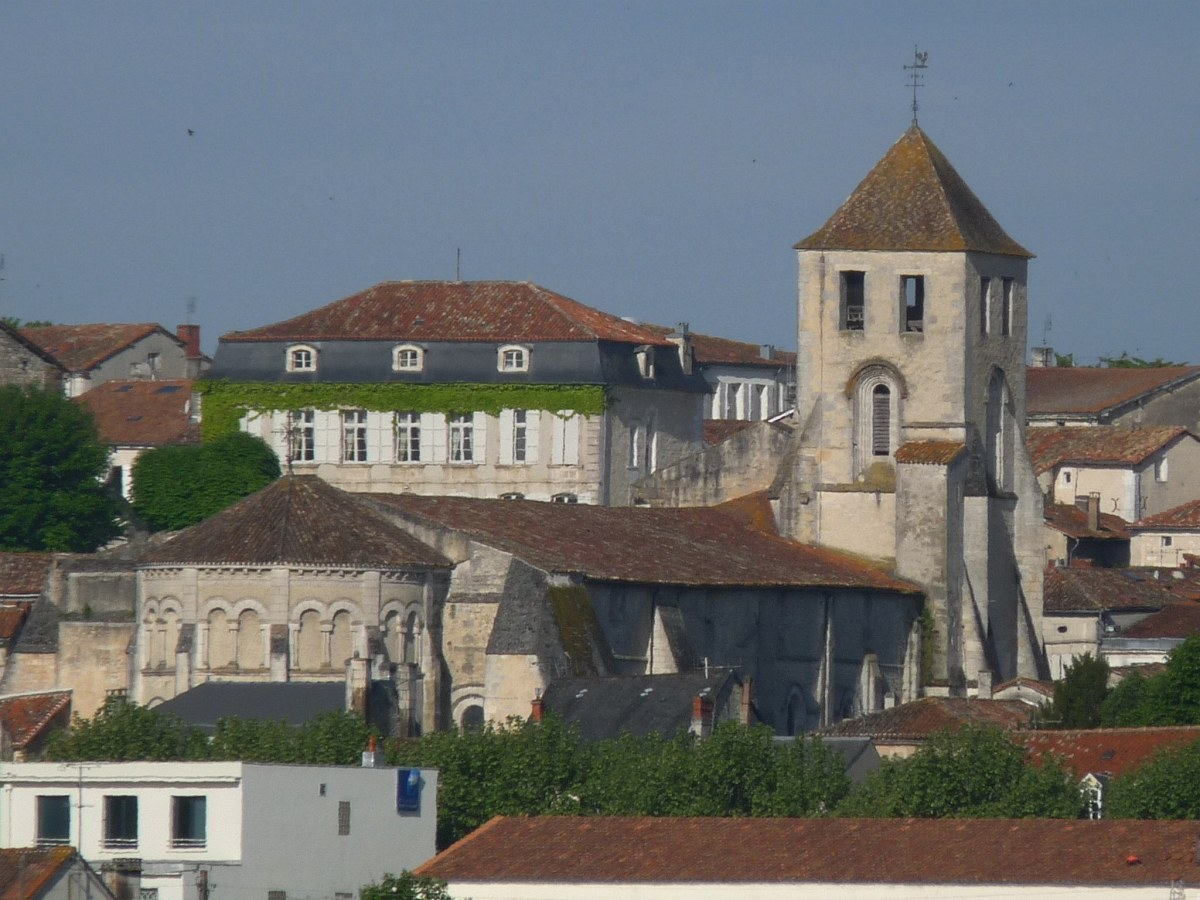
View of St Mathias, Barbezieux

The main church of Barbezieux, St Mathias, was built in the twelfth century and is one of the largest in the Diocese of Angoulême. Entering the church, there is the statue of St Mathias. At one time, the Apostle's head is said to have been kept in the church. The church has been altered over the centuries and had major restoration in the 1970s. It is a fine example of a Romanesque church, well used by the community.

== Notable people ==
- Philippe Besson (born 1967), writer
- Corine Pelluchon (born 1967), philosopher and professor
- Renaud Lavillenie (born 1986), pole vaulter
- Valentin Lavillenie (born 1991), pole vaulter

== Town twinning ==
- Wolfratshausen (Germany) since 1970, in Bavaria.
- Vignola (Italy) since 1982, in Emilia-Romagna, Province of Modena.
- Chardonne (Switzerland) since 1986, in the canton of Vaud.

== See also ==
- Communes of the Charente department
