= Something to Live for: The Alison Gertz Story =

1992 television film directed by Tom McLoughlin

- Genre: Drama
- Written by: Deborah Joy LeVine
- Directed by: Tom McLoughlin
- Starring: Molly Ringwald; Lee Grant; Perry King; Martin Landau
- Theme music composer: David Shire
- Country of origin: United States
- Original language: English

Production
- Executive producers: Joan Barnett; Jack Grossbart
- Cinematography: Shelly Johnson
- Editors: Charles Bornstein; Sidney Wolinsky
- Running time: 100 minutes
- Production companies: Grossbart Barnett Productions; Spectacor Films

Original release
- Network: ABC
- Release: March 29, 1992

Something to Live for: The Alison Gertz Story (also known in UK as Fatal Love) is a 1992 American television film based on the life of prominent AIDS activist Alison Gertz. It originally aired on ABC on March 29, 1992, approximately four months before Gertz's death.

== Plot summary ==
Alison Gertz (played by Molly Ringwald) is an affluent and self-assured Manhattanite. At the age of sixteen, Gertz meets a bartender named Darren and has a one-night stand with him. This results in her contracting HIV. Gertz overcomes her fears and becomes an advocate educating high school and college students about AIDS and its possible threats to sexually active people of those ages.

== Background ==
A federal AIDS information number released after the film generated a record 189,251 calls within 24 hours of the film's showing, mostly from women.

In an early-1992 article published in various daily newspapers across America, author Jerry Buck noted that Ringwald had described the role as "nerve-wracking", however her portrayal of the real-life AIDS patient Alison Gertz fulfilled a personal need to combat the disease. Ringwald had stated "I'd been wanting to do something to help in the fight against AIDS, but I didn't know what to do. I didn't think I would be very good at raising funds, since Madonna and Elizabeth Taylor are doing a terrific job. I wanted to do something to increase public awareness. When the script came along I knew this was it. It shows that AIDS is not just a gay problem and is spreading rapidly among heterosexuals. Young people are very vulnerable because they're experimenting sexually, yet often feel it can't affect them."

In the same article, it was stated that Ringwald first became interested in the story when Gertz's diaries were submitted to a production company the actress had at Columbia Pictures. Ringwald did not pursue it at the time, but when a script for the film was sent to her, she accepted. Buck also noted that Ringwald sought to learn all she could about Alison Gertz during a brief meeting with her before filming began. Ringwald stated "I pretty much wanted to get a fix on what this girl was all about. I wanted to see how she talked, how she dressed, what her apartment was like. I'd never played a real person before. Then when I started to play her I let it all go. I'm not an impersonator. No matter how good an actress I am I couldn't be her completely. Ali understood and supported that. The way I looked at it she could be any girl. She could be me... But I did feel a special responsibility. It was nerve-wracking." It was also noted that the actress wanted the movie to show all of Gertz's moods and colors, from depressed and angry to very positive. Ringwald stated "We did one scene where we tried to emphasize safe sex yet be romantic. We used two condoms. I think it's important to show condoms in a romantic scene."

== Cast ==
- Molly Ringwald – Alison Gertz
- Lee Grant – Carol Gertz
- Perry King – Mark
- Roxana Zal – Tracy
- George Coe – Dr. Feldman
- Christopher Meloni – David
- Kim Myers – Lindy
- Peter Spears – Peter
- Robert Bauer – Ben
- Victor Brandt – Dr. Siege
- Janet MacLachlan – Mrs. Barrett
- Martin Landau – Jerry Gertz
- Ren Hanami – Younger Nurse
- Jody Montana – Darren

== Critical reception ==
Allmovie gave the film three out of five stars and wrote:

"Something to Live For: The Alison Gertz Story was one of a myriad of early 1990s TV movies centering around the AIDS issue. Perhaps if it had been made five years earlier, and perhaps if it didn't have its characters speaking fluent pop profundities, Something to Live For might have been one of the truly important made-for-TV AIDS sagas."

Picks and Pans (People magazine) reviewed the movie upon release, giving an A grade and writing:

"As Gertz, Molly Ringwald gives a richly nuanced performance, fighting through denial, anger and the other stages of impending mortality until she finds courage in adversity. Ringwald is supported by one of the season's strongest casts. Director Tom McLoughlin frames the story in an engrossing fashion, jumping back and forth in time. Using tints, smoke and echoes, he also manages to evoke the fevered state of serious illness. Rarely is a cautionary tale told so artfully."

New York Magazine gave a favorable review upon release and wrote:

Something to Live For is television in its Social Worker Mode, which is not a form I sneer at. TV's been downright heroic in the plague years and may be all the conscience we've got. And Ali's presentable in prime time for the same reason she's presentable in junior high schools: She is young, gifted, white, female, cute, equally innocent of leather bars and IV drugs, upper-middle class, and Upper East Side. Such unfairness ought never to have happened to such a sweetheart. Ringward is bratty and brave. As her parents, Lee Grant and Martin Landau are better than their money. Roxana Zal is a girlfriend who thinks she should've been afflicted. Peter Spears is a gay friend who explains the facts of death. There's a scary scene with Perry King, two condoms, and a scrub-down out of The Andromeda Strain.

Film Review, Issue 1 (Orpheus Pub.) gave the film three out of five stars, calling the film a "harrowing true-life story."
