= The Latin Porter =

Live album by Mark Murphy
- Released: 2000
- Recorded: January 19–20, 2000
- Venue: Dakota Bar and Grill, St. Paul, Minnesota
- Genre: Vocal jazz
- Length: 1:06:43
- Label: Go Jazz
- Producer: Leo Sidran

Mark Murphy chronology
Some Time Ago (1999)	The Latin Porter (2000)	Links (2000)

The Latin Porter is a live album by Mark Murphy.

The Latin Porter is the 38th album by American jazz vocalist Mark Murphy. It was recorded in 2000 when Murphy was 68 years old and released by the Go Jazz label in Germany and the United States in 2000. The album is a collection of Cole Porter songs performed live with a jazz sextet and with guest trumpeter Tom Harrell at the Dakota Bar and Grill, January 19 and 20, 2002, St. Paul, MN.

== Background ==
After completing Some Time Ago Murphy recorded The Latin Porter as a onetime release on the label Go Jazz, before his new contract with Joe Field's new label HighNote took effect. This live set of Cole Porter songs recorded in January 2000 at the Dakota Bar in St Paul, Minnesota also featured trumpeter Tom Harrell. Murphy says on the recording, "Cole Porter proved that you don't have to be poor to write a good song. Everything that's old is becoming new again - even me, folks."

Murphy had recently won the 2000 Downbeat Magazine Reader's Poll as Male Vocalist of the Year and would win again in 2001.

== Recording ==
The album was produced by Leo Sidran. This was the Grammy and Oscar winning multi-instrumentalist, singer-songwriter, arranger, sound engineer podcaster and musical producer's only album with Murphy. Sidran hired pianist Peter Schimke, considered a Latin specialist, as musical director. Schimke hired trombonist Al Bent to do the arrangements. Peter Jones says, "The songs are all rendered Latin style, heavy on percussion". Bent had recorded previously with Cal Tjader, Pete Escovedo, and Santana, among others. Murphy improvises heavily, using scat, vocalese, and wordless improvisation. Extended time is given to instrumental solos from the band.

Tom Harrell previously recorded with Murphy on Satisfaction Guaranteed and The Artistry Of Mark Murphy. Other than Harrell, the remaining musicians forming the septet had not previously recorded with Murphy.

== Reception ==
Professional ratings
Review scores
Source	Rating
AllMusic	4.5/5 stars

AllMusic assigns the album 4.5 stars. Alex Henderson writes, "Murphy manages to keep the Porter songbook fresh and exciting...every Porter standard on this excellent CD gets a Latin makeover". He writes of Murphy's performance, "Besides, the veteran singer is so risk-taking and distinctive that even the most overdone warhorses can be interesting in his hands...he also unearths a few of Porter's lesser-known gems, including "Looking at You" and "Experimental." He concludes by saying, "The Latin Porter is, without question, one of 2000's most rewarding jazz vocal releases".

Scott Yanow, in his book The Jazz Singers: The Ultimate Guide, includes the album in his list of "other worthy recordings of the past 20 years" by Mark Murphy.

Murphy biographer Peter Jones, calls the release, "another fine album".

Michael Pronko writes, "The Latin Porter, released last year, deftly braids together his highly improvisational style with the sophisticated bounce of Cole Porter's compositions and lilting Latin rhythms".

== Track listing ==
1. "I Get a Kick Out of You" (Cole Porter) – 9:38
2. "In the Still of the Night" (Porter) – 7:30
3. "Dream Dancing" (Porter) – 7:15
4. "Get Out of Town" (Porter) – 5:42
5. "Looking at You" (Porter) – 6:09
6. "I've Got You Under My Skin" (Porter) – 4:33
7. "All of You" (Porter) – 9:41
8. "Everything I Love" (Porter) – 8:33
9. "Experimental" (Porter) – 7:41

== Personnel ==
Performance

- Mark Murphy – vocals, original concept
- Tom Harrell – trumpet
- Mark Van Wageningen – bass
- Peter Schimke – piano, music director
- Daniel Gonzalez – drums
- Esther Godinez – percussion, backup vocal
- Al Bent – trombone, arranger

Production

- Steve Wiese – mixing, recording engineer, recorded at Dakota Bar and Grill January 19 and 20, 2002, St. Paul, MN
- Leo Sidran – producer, mixing
- George Marino – mastering
- Gonzalo Lasheras – production assistance
- Mike Dvorak – photography
