= Molly Ringwald =

American actress and writer (born 1968)

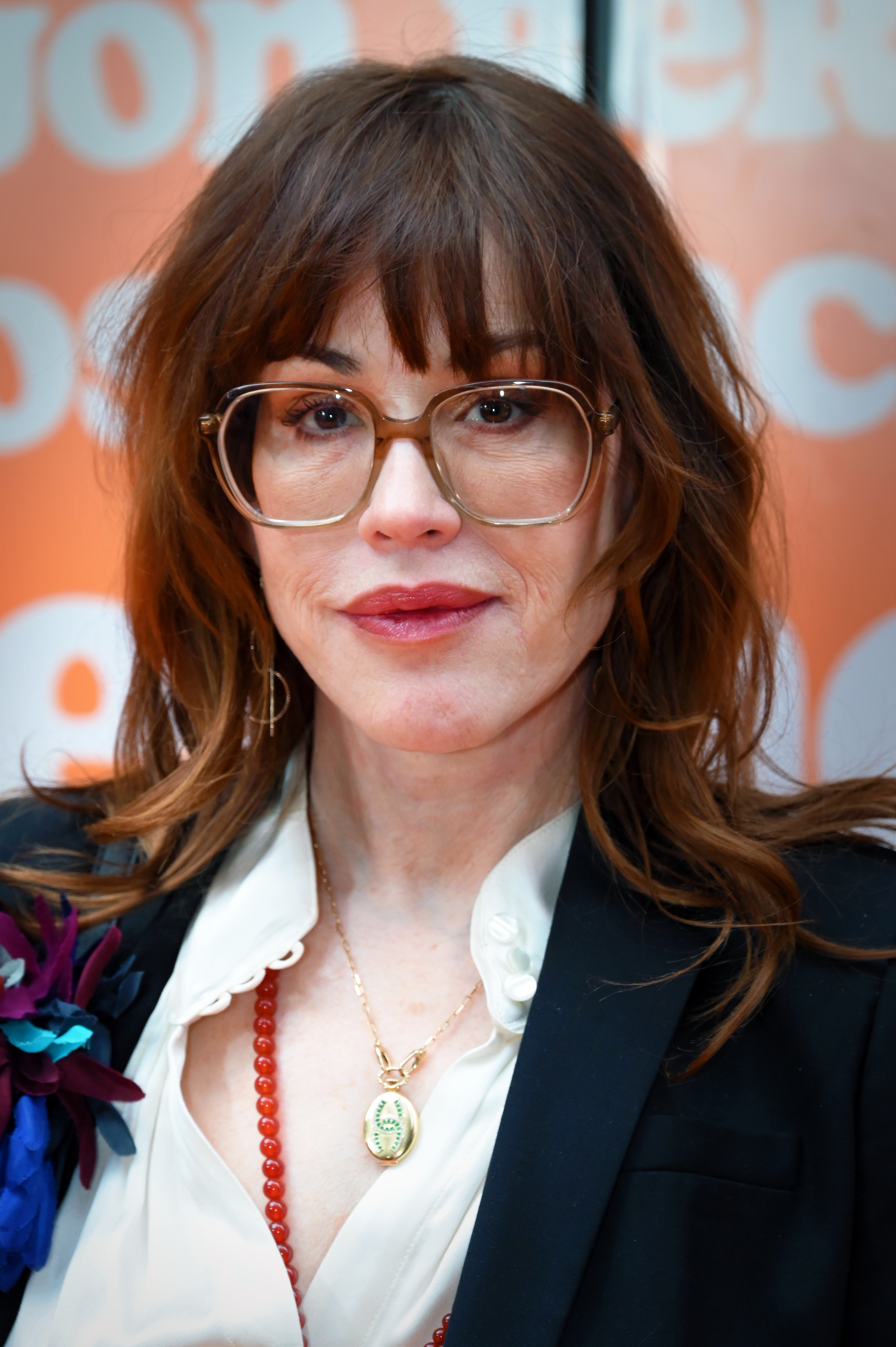
- Ringwald in 2026
- Born: Molly Kathleen Ringwald; February 18, 1968 (age 58); Roseville, California, U.S.
- Occupations: Actress; singer; dancer; writer; model
- Years active: 1977–present
- Spouses: Valéry Lameignère (m. 1999; div. 2002) Panio Gianopoulos (m. 2007)
- Children: 3

Molly Kathleen Ringwald (born February 18, 1968) is an American actress, writer, and translator. She began her career as a child actress on the sitcoms Diff'rent Strokes and The Facts of Life (both 1979–1980) before being nominated for a Golden Globe Award for her starring role in the drama film Tempest (1982). Ringwald became a teen idol following her lead roles in filmmaker John Hughes's teenage films Sixteen Candles (1984), The Breakfast Club (1985), and Pretty in Pink (1986). These films led to the media referring to her as a member of a group of actors known as the "Brat Pack."

Ringwald's final starring roles as a teenager were in The Pick-up Artist (1987), For Keeps (1988), and Fresh Horses (1988). In the 1990s, she starred in the films Betsy's Wedding (1990) and Teaching Mrs. Tingle (1999), as well as starring in multiple French films after a move to Paris. Ringwald also returned to television, with main roles as Frannie Goldsmith in the ABC miniseries The Stand (1994) and Carrie Donovan on the ABC sitcom Townies (1996). In the 2000s, she had a main role as Anne Juergens on the ABC Family series The Secret Life of the American Teenager (2008–2013).

In the 2010s, Ringwald had starring roles in the films Jem and the Holograms (2015), and Siberia (2018), and a main role as Paige Wayney on the Family Channel television series Raising Expectations (2016–2018). In the late 2010s and 2020s, she experienced a career resurgence with a recurring role as Mary Andrews on the CW series Riverdale (2017–2023), and a starring role in The Kissing Booth film series (2018–2021). Ringwald later had main roles as Shari Dahmer on the first season of the Netflix biographical anthology series Monster (2022) and Joanne Carson on the second season of the FX biographical anthology series Feud (2024).

== Early life and education ==
Ringwald was born in Roseville, California, in 1968 the daughter of Adele Edith (née Frembd), a cook, and Robert Scott Ringwald, a blind jazz pianist. Ringwald has two siblings and an older brother who died before she was born. She is of German and Swedish descent. She started her acting career at age five, appearing in a stage production of Alice in Wonderland as the Dormouse. The next year, she recorded Molly Sings: I Wanna Be Loved by You, a music album of Dixieland jazz with her father and his group, the Fulton Street Jazz Band. Ringwald graduated from the Lycée Français de Los Angeles.

== Career ==
In 1978 at the age of 10, Ringwald was chosen to play Kate in the West Coast production of Annie. In 1979, Ringwald appeared on the TV series Diff'rent Strokes and was selected to become part of the large cast of that show's spin-off, The Facts of Life. She played Molly Parker, a perky, feminist student at Eastland Girls School. At the beginning of the second season, the show underwent a major revamp, and most of the cast, including Ringwald, were cut from the show. Ringwald later said that Nancy McKeon replaced her to play a new character named Jo.

In 1980, Ringwald performed as a lead vocalist on two Disney albums. On the patriotic album Yankee Doodle Mickey, Ringwald sang "This Is My Country" and "The Star-Spangled Banner". She later performed one track, "The First Noel", on a Disney Christmas album, Disney's Merry Christmas Carols. Turning toward motion pictures, she got a key supporting role in the 1982 film Tempest, directed by Paul Mazursky with top casting director Juliet Taylor, and was nominated for a Golden Globe award for the role.

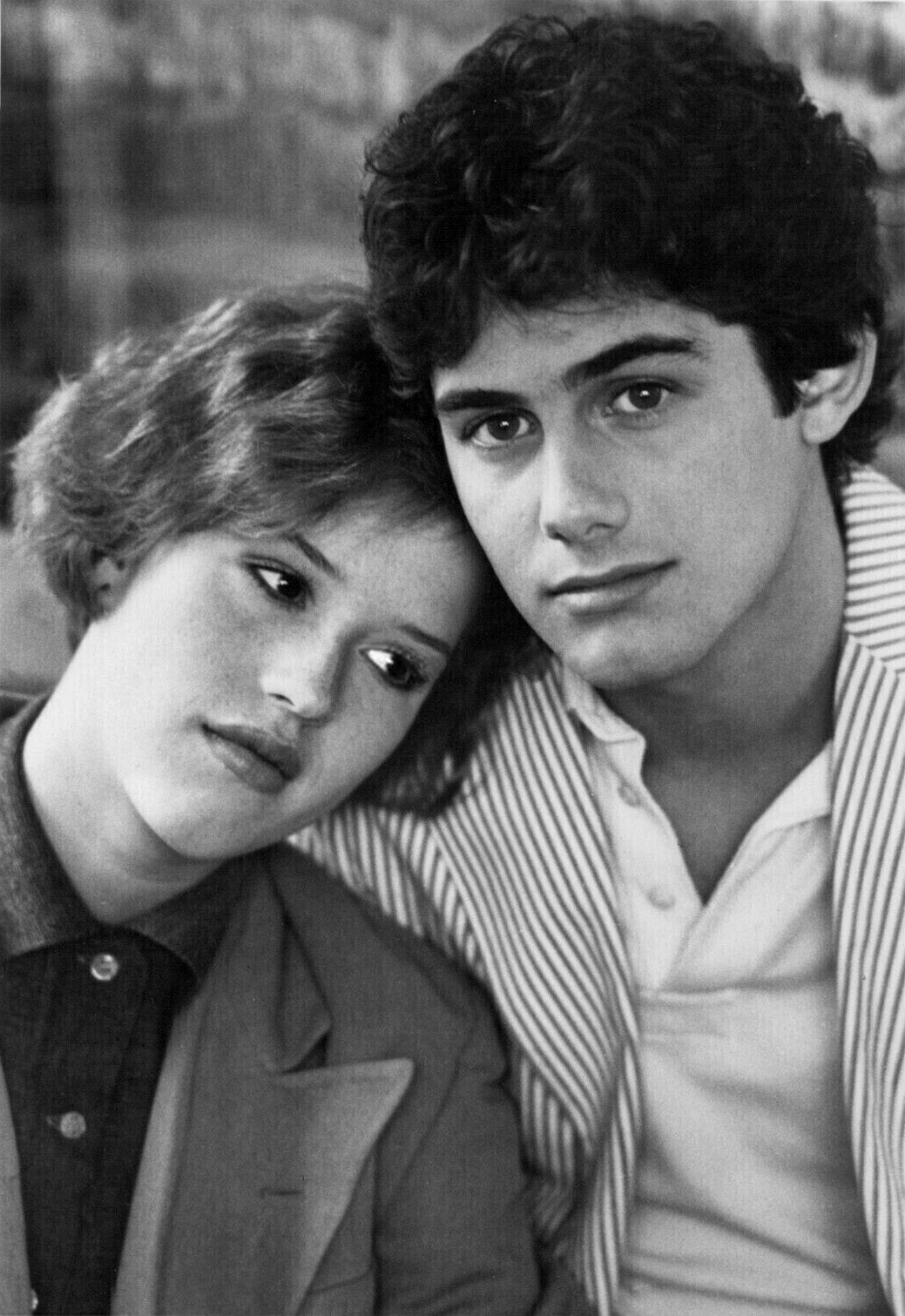
Ringwald with Zach Galligan in Surviving, 1985

Ringwald rose to prominence with her breakout role in Sixteen Candles (1984). She was cast as Samantha Baker, a girl whose sixteenth birthday is forgotten by her family. Ringwald's performance gained critical acclaim; many called her acting engaging. Ringwald later said, "It is not a good idea to do remakes of great classic films" when asked if there would be a remake to Sixteen Candles. Ringwald was regarded as a member of the Brat Pack of 1980s teen actors but has said she was not really part of that group. Ringwald gained more success when she was cast in another John Hughes film, The Breakfast Club (1985), which was a commercial and critical success. Ringwald was cast as Claire Standish, a spoiled, wealthy beauty who is in detention for skipping class to go to the mall. Ringwald's performance gained strong reviews.

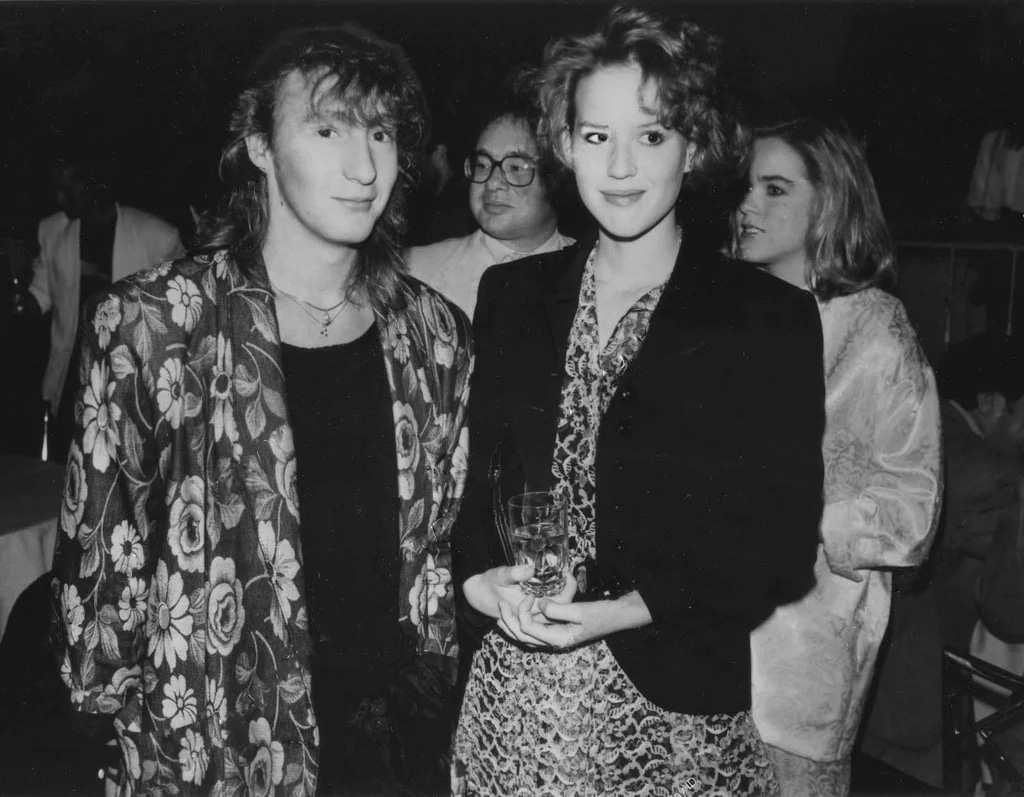
Ringwald with Julian Lennon at the Billboard Music Video Convention, 1985

The following year, still in high school, she was cast as Andie Walsh in another successful Hughes film, Pretty in Pink (1986). When first asked to be in Pretty in Pink, Ringwald was reluctant, but after seeing how hard it was for the producers to find a replacement for her, she decided she would portray Andie in the film. Ringwald was offered a role in another John Hughes film, Some Kind of Wonderful (1987), but turned down the role as she felt it was too similar to the other films she worked on with Hughes. After Pretty In Pink, she wanted to act in more mature roles. Ringwald was featured on the cover of the May 26, 1986, issue of Time.

Ringwald was set to star in another Hughes film, Oil and Vinegar, but the film was scrapped when Hughes refused to rewrite the script. The film would have been about a soon-to-be-married man and a hitchhiking girl talking about their lives during the length of a car ride. In 1987, she was cast as Randy Jensen in The Pick-up Artist, opposite Robert Downey, Jr. in one of his first lead roles.

The following year, she starred in For Keeps, a commercial success that received mixed reviews from critics but was well received by audiences. It is considered Ringwald's final teen movie. Ringwald portrayed Darcy Elliot, the editor at her high school paper, who becomes pregnant by her long-term boyfriend Stan, portrayed by Randall Batinkoff. Her performance received positive reviews. The film was praised by some critics for showing the struggles of teen pregnancy. She was later cast in Fresh Horses. The film was met with generally negative reviews and underperformed at the box office. The film also starred Andrew McCarthy, who previously worked with Ringwald in Pretty in Pink.

Ringwald was turned down for leading roles in Working Girl and The Silence of the Lambs, later commenting that: "I didn't really feel like darker roles were available to me. The ones that I wanted to do, I didn't get." Ringwald reportedly turned down the female lead roles in Pretty Woman and Ghost.

In the mid-1990s, Ringwald, who had been educated at the Lycée Français de Los Angeles and is fluent in French, moved to Paris and starred in several French movies. She returned to the United States intermittently to appear in American movies and television. In 1990, Ringwald appeared in the James Scott-directed Strike It Rich alongside Robert Lindsay and John Gielgud. That same year she starred in Betsy's Wedding as Betsy Hopper. This film gained generally mixed reviews despite being a commercial success. Ringwald later starred in Something to Live for: The Alison Gertz Story (1992).

In 1994, she was cast as Frannie Goldsmith in the TV miniseries The Stand, an adaptation of Stephen King's 1978 novel of the same name. Ringwald's performance was generally well received. She next played the leading role in the film Malicious (1995) as Melissa Nelson, a disturbed woman who has an affair with a college star baseball player. She later starred in the ABC sitcom Townies. She appeared as a blind woman on the critically acclaimed cable series Remember WENN. She starred with Lara Flynn Boyle and Teri Hatcher in the 1998 made-for-television film Since You've Been Gone. In 1999, she played the starring role of "Li'l Bit" in Paula Vogel's play How I Learned to Drive at the Mark Taper Forum in Los Angeles. In 2000, she appeared in an episode of Showtime's The Outer Limits, "Judgment Day".

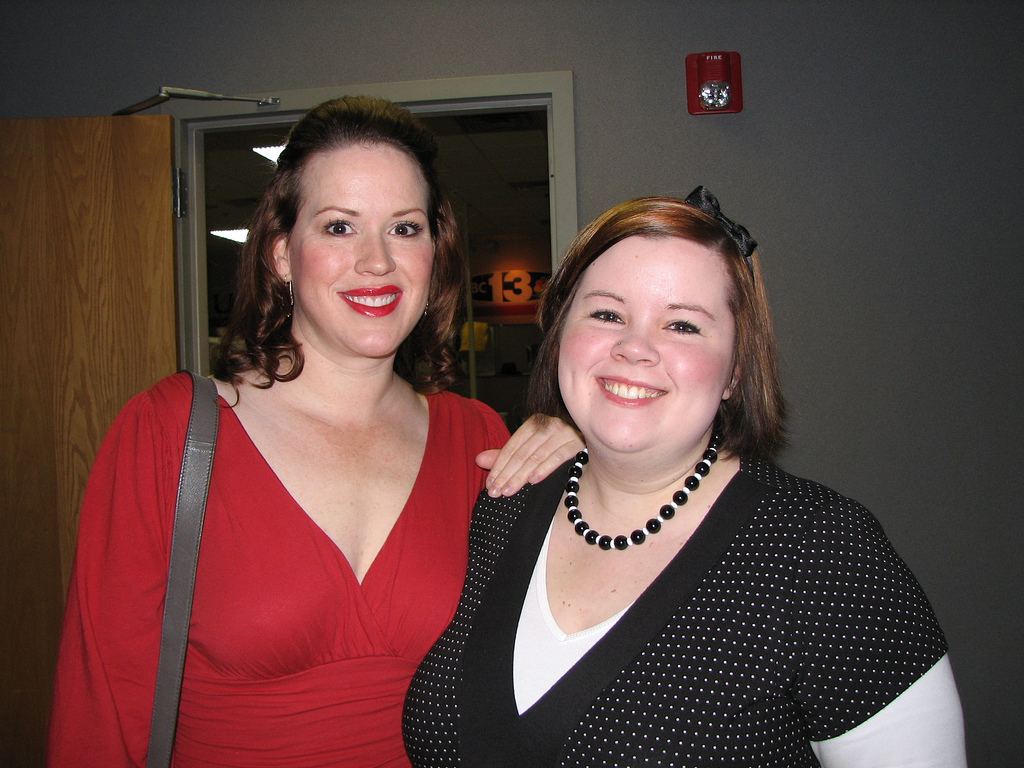
Ringwald (left) with a fan, 2007

In 2000, Ringwald appeared in the ensemble restaurant-themed film In the Weeds, and in 2001 she had a cameo in the commercially successful Not Another Teen Movie that earned her an MTV Movie Award nomination. In theater, she wore a "Green, Green Dress" as Susan in Jonathan Larson's Off-Broadway musical tick, tick... BOOM!, and headlined as Sally Bowles in Broadway's long-running revival of Cabaret from 2001 to 2002. In 2003, Ringwald appeared in Enchanted April on Broadway.

In 2004, she starred in the play Modern Orthodox on Broadway, opposite Jason Biggs and Craig Bierko. In 2006 she starred in the television film The Wives He Forgot, and that fall and winter starred as Charity Hope Valentine in the national tour of the Broadway revival of the musical Sweet Charity. She also played a supporting role as Molly McIntire's mother Helen in Molly: An American Girl on the Home Front. Ringwald starred in the ABC Family network's series The Secret Life of the American Teenager, which ran for five seasons and 121 episodes between 2008 and 2013.

Ringwald played Madame Frechette in the 2014 Lifetime Christmas film Wishin' and Hopin' and Aunt Bailey in the 2015 film Jem and the Holograms. In 2016, she was cast as Amy in the crime-drama film King Cobra. Ringwald had a recurring role as main character Archie Andrews's mother Mary Andrews on The CW television series Riverdale. After initially only appearing as a guest, Ringwald took a more prominent role in the series following the death of Luke Perry who played Archie's father.

== Other ventures ==
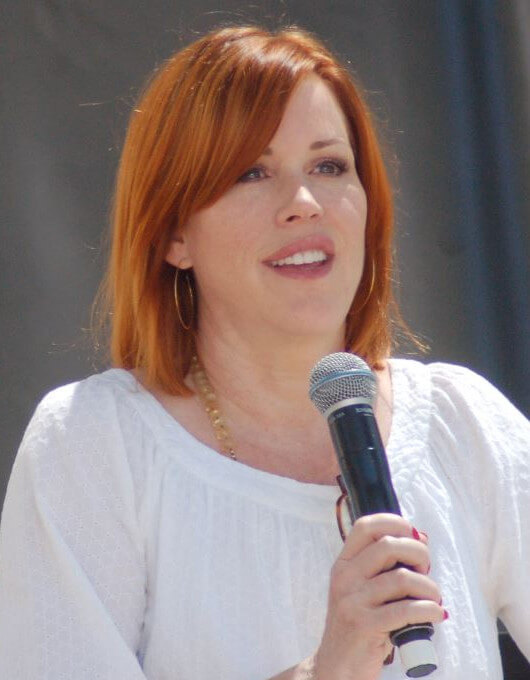
Ringwald in 2013

Ringwald has translated two books from French to English. The first was the novel Lie with Me by Philippe Besson. The second was My Cousin Maria Schneider by Vanessa Schneider, a book about the French actress Maria Schneider, whose career was largely defined by a sex scene with Marlon Brando in the film Last Tango in Paris despite her many other accomplishments as an actress.

Ringwald read the audiobook edition of the 2012 novel The Middlesteins by Jami Attenberg. In 2013, Ringwald released Except Sometimes, a jazz record. It follows a tradition in jazz for the Ringwald family set by her father. "I grew up in a home filled with music and had an early appreciation of jazz since my dad was a jazz musician. Beginning at around age three I started singing with his band and jazz music has continued to be one of my three passions along with acting and writing. I like to say jazz music is my musical equivalent of comfort food. It's always where I go back to when I want to feel grounded," Ringwald said in a statement.

In 2014, Ringwald began writing an advice column for The Guardian, answering questions about "love, family, or life in general". In February 2024, Ringwald made her runway modeling debut at New York Fashion Week, walking for Batsheva.

== Public image ==
Ringwald stated she was very aware of her public image during her teen years and she tried to be a good role model for her fans. When asked about For Keeps (1988), Ringwald said, "I didn't want to give the wrong message to teenagers. I sort of felt a certain responsibility – I mean, I was a very, very famous teenager and I thought a lot of teenagers were looking up to me and emulating me, and I really didn't want to make a movie that said in any way that having a baby at that age was going to be easy."

== Personal life ==
In the 1980s, Ringwald dated musician Dweezil Zappa and rapper Ad-Rock of the hip-hop group Beastie Boys.

In the mid-1990s, Ringwald, who had been educated at the Lycée Français de Los Angeles and is fluent in French, moved to Paris and starred in several French movies.

Ringwald married Valéry Lameignère, a French writer, in Bordeaux, France, on July 28, 1999; they divorced in 2002. She married Panio Gianopoulos, a Greek-American writer and book editor, in 2007. They have a daughter and boy-girl twins. Her pregnancy was written into the storyline of The Secret Life of the American Teenager. She was the subject of an episode in season 7 of the genealogy series Who Do You Think You Are?.

== Filmography ==
=== Film ===
Molly Ringwald film work
| Year | Title | Role | Notes |
|---|---|---|---|
| 1982 | Tempest | Miranda Dimitrius | |
| 1983 | Spacehunter: Adventures in the Forbidden Zone | Niki | |
| 1984 | Sixteen Candles | Samantha "Sam" Baker | |
| 1985 | The Breakfast Club | Claire Standish | |
| 1986 | Pretty in Pink | Andie Walsh | |
| 1987 | P.K. and the Kid | P.K. Bayette | |
| 1987 | King Lear | Cordelia | Directed by Jean-Luc Godard |
| 1987 | The Pick-up Artist | Randy Jensen | |
| 1988 | For Keeps | Darcy Bobrucz | |
| 1988 | Fresh Horses | Jewel | |
| 1990 | Strike It Rich | Cary Porter | |
| 1990 | Betsy's Wedding | Betsy Hopper | |
| 1993 | Face the Music | Lisa Hunter | |
| 1994 | Some Folks Call It a Sling Blade | Theresa Tatum | Short film |
| 1995 | Baja | Bebe Stone | |
| 1995 | Seven Sundays | Janet Gifford | |
| 1995 | Malicious | Melissa Nelson | |
| 1996 | Bastard Children | Susan | |
| 1997 | Office Killer | Kim Poole | |
| 1999 | Requiem for Murder | Anne Winslow | |
| 1999 | Teaching Mrs. Tingle | Miss Banks | |
| 1999 | Kimberly | Nancy | |
| 2000 | Cut | Vanessa Turnbill / Chloe | |
| 2000 | The Brutal Truth | Penelope | |
| 2000 | In the Weeds | Chloe | |
| 2000 | The Translator | Julie Newman | Short film |
| 2001 | Cowboy Up | Connie | |
| 2001 | Not Another Teen Movie | Flight Attendant | |
| 2008 | Guest of Cindy Sherman | Herself | Documentary |
| 2010 | Wax On, F*ck Off | Herself | Short film |
| 2014 | Electric Boogaloo: The Wild, Untold Story of Cannon Films | Herself | Documentary |
| 2015 | Jem and the Holograms | Aunt Bailey | |
| 2015 | Bad Night | The Collector | |
| 2016 | King Cobra | Amy Kocis | |
| 2017 | SPF-18 | Faye Cooper | |
| 2018 | All These Small Moments | Carla Sheffield | |
| 2018 | The Kissing Booth | Mrs. Flynn | |
| 2018 | Siberia | Gabby Hill | |
| 2020 | The Kissing Booth 2 | Mrs. Flynn | |
| 2021 | The Kissing Booth 3 | Mrs. Flynn | |
| 2023 | Judy Blume Forever | Herself | Documentary |
| 2023 | Bad Things | Ms. Auerbach | |
| 2025 | Montauk | Wolcott | |
| 2026 | Run Amok | Aunt Val | |
| 2026 | One Night Only | Linda | |

=== Television ===
Molly Ringwald television work
| Year | Title | Role | Notes |
|---|---|---|---|
| 1979–1980 | Diff'rent Strokes | Molly Parker | 2 episodes |
| 1979–1980 | The Facts of Life | Molly Parker | Main role (Season 1–2); 14 episodes |
| 1983 | Packin' It In | Melissa Webber | Television film |
| 1985 | Surviving: A Family in Crisis | Lonnie Carson | Television film |
| 1986 | Tall Tales & Legends | Jenny Smith | Episode: "Johnny Appleseed" |
| 1990 | Women & Men: Stories of Seduction | Kit | Television film |
| 1992 | Something to Live for: The Alison Gertz Story | Alison Gertz | Television film |
| 1994 | The Stand | Frannie Goldsmith | Lead role |
| 1996 | Townies | Carrie Donovan | Lead role |
| 1996 | Remember WENN | Angela Colton | Episode: "Sight Unseen" |
| 1998 | Saturday Night Live | Anne Frank | Voice; episode: "Steve Buscemi/Third Eye Blind" |
| 1998 | Twice Upon a Time | Beth Sager | Television film |
| 2000 | The $treet | Devyn Alden | Episode: "Propheting on Losses" |
| 2000 | The Outer Limits | Allison Channing | Episode: "Judgment Day" |
| 2006 | Medium | Kathleen Walsh | Episode: "The Darkness is Light Enough" |
| 2006 | The Wives He Forgot | Charlotte Saint John | Television film |
| 2006 | Molly: An American Girl on the Home Front | Helen McIntire | Television film |
| 2008–2013 | The Secret Life of the American Teenager | Anne Juergens | Main cast |
| 2011 | Psych | Nurse McElroy | Episode: "Shawn, Interrupted" |
| 2011 | RuPaul's Drag U | Herself | Episode: "Like a Virgin" |
| 2014 | Rainbow Brite | Dark Princess | Voice; 3 episodes |
| 2014 | Wishin' & Hopin' | Madame Frechette | Television film |
| 2016–2018 | Raising Expectations | Paige Wayney | Main cast |
| 2016 | Odd Mom Out | Joy Greene | 2 episodes |
| 2016 | Doc McStuffins | Darla | Voice; 4 episodes |
| 2017–2023 | Riverdale | Mary Andrews | Recurring role; 36 episodes |
| 2018 | Drop the Mic | Herself | Episode: "Odell Beckham Jr. vs. Shawn Mendes / Molly Ringwald vs. Jon Cryer" |
| 2019 | Tales of the City | Mrs. Duncan | 2 episodes |
| 2021 | Creepshow | Mrs. Porter | Episode: "Sibling Rivalry" |
| 2022 | The Bear | Al-Anon Moderator | Episode: "Brigade" |
| 2022 | Monster | Shari Dahmer | Main cast (Season 1) |
| 2023 | Single Drunk Female | Alice | Episode: "Shiva" |
| 2023 | HouseBroken | Milly | Voice; episode: "Who Got Burned?" |
| 2024 | Feud | Joanne Carson | 5 episodes (Season 2) |

== Discography ==
- Molly Sings: I Wanna Be Loved by You (1975)
- Except Sometimes (2013)
- Going Home Alone (2013)

== Bibliography ==
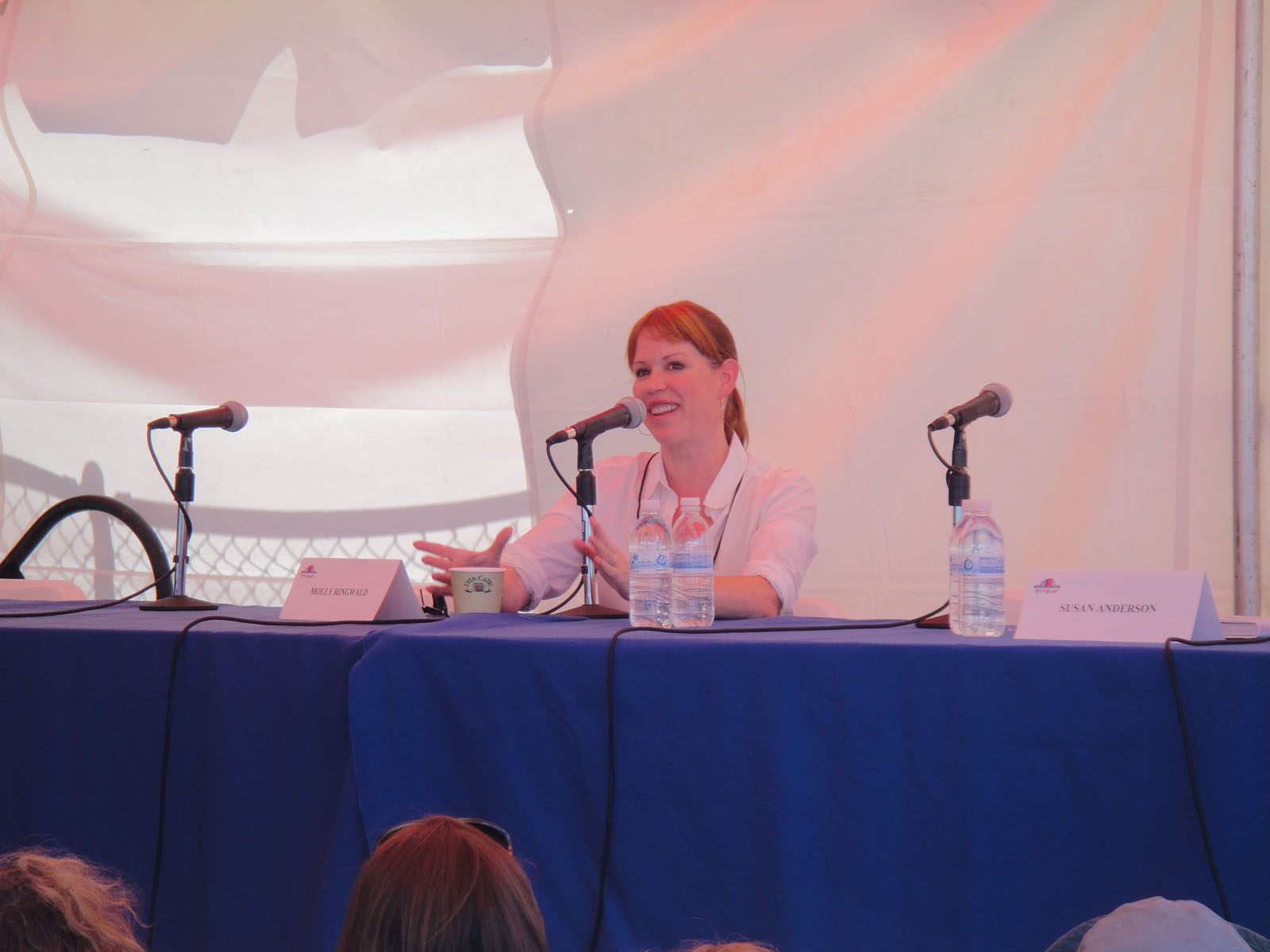
Ringwald at the WeHo Book Fair in 2010

- Getting the Pretty Back: Friendship, Family, and Finding the Perfect Lipstick (2010)
- When It Happens to You: A Novel in Stories (2012)
- Lie with Me (2019) by Philippe Besson, as translator
- My Cousin Maria Schneider: A Memoir (2023) by Vanessa Schneider, as translator

== Awards and nominations ==
| Year | Award | Category | Nominated work | Result |
|---|---|---|---|---|
| 1982 | Young Artist Awards | Best Young Supporting Actress in a Motion Picture | Tempest | Nominated |
| 1983 | Golden Globe Awards | New Star of the Year – Actress | Tempest | Nominated |
| 1985 | Young Artist Awards | Best Young Actress in a Motion Picture: Musical, Comedy, Adventure or Drama | Sixteen Candles | Won |
| 1989 | Kids' Choice Awards | Favorite Movie Actress | For Keeps | Nominated |
| 1991 | Golden Raspberry Awards | Worst Actress | Betsy's Wedding | Nominated |
| 2002 | MTV Movie & TV Awards | Best Cameo | Not Another Teen Movie | Nominated |
| 2005 | MTV Movie & TV Awards | Silver Bucket of Excellence Award | The Breakfast Club | Won |
| 2009 | Teen Choice Awards | Choice TV Parental Unit | The Secret Life of the American Teenager | Nominated |
