= Some Time Ago =

- Photography by Bill Claxton

Studio album by Mark Murphy
- Released: 2000
- Recorded: December 27–28, 1999
- Studio: M&I Recording Studios, New York
- Genre: Vocal jazz
- Length: 54:00
- Label: HighNote Records
- Producer: Don Sickler

Mark Murphy chronology
Song for the Geese (1997)	Some Time Ago (2000)	The Latin Porter (2000)

Some Time Ago is the 37th album by American jazz vocalist Mark Murphy. It was recorded in 1999 when Murphy was 68 years old and was released by the HighNote Records label in the United States in 2000. The album is a collection of jazz bebop tunes and standards, with Murphy backed by a jazz quintet.

== Background ==
Some Time Ago was Murphy's first of five releases on Joe Fields' label HighNote after Fields sold Muse Records to Joel Dorn. Fields. inspired by mentor Bob Weinstock's development and sale of Prestige Records to Fantasy Records for a large profit, had always intended to sell Muse. He almost immediately formed HighNote Records with his son and signed on Murphy.

Murphy started professionally in the 1950s when bebop was flourishing. In the liner notes, James Gavin describes the loneliness and financial hardships that the life of a touring jazz singer involves. He says, Murphy "takes us from the wild exhilaration of bebop to a darker place that Mark knows well".

Murphy won the 2000 Downbeat Magazine Reader's Poll as Male Vocalist of the Year and would win again in 2001.

== Recording ==
The album was produced by American jazz trumpeter, arranger Don Sickler, his first recording project with Murphy. Lee Musiker was hired as arranger and pianist. Musiker had previously backed many singers including Meredith d'Ambrosio, Audra McDonald, Judy Collins, Susannah McCorkle, Margaret Whiting, Ann Hampton Callaway, Mandy Patinkin, Helen Merrill, Dawn Upshaw, Barbara Cook and played in Buddy Rich's band. He would also work with Murphy on Links (HighNote, 2000). Murphy said: "I've had many wonderful musicians on records, but when you get exactly who you want, the synergy just flows so beautifully. The way Lee plays for me and my reaction to him is just magic time. That doesn't happen every day, but when it does it makes the whole kettle of cuckoos crazy."

Bassist Sean Smith (on four tracks) wrote the songs "I'll Call You" and "Song for the Geese (Tema Para los Gansos)" with Murphy and would record with him again on Links in 2000. Bassist Steve LaSpina (on five tracks) previously recorded with Murphy on Beauty and the Beast and Kerouac, Then and Now. "They both played like angels," Mark said in the liner notes. This was jazz drummer Winard Harper's first recording with Murphy. Harper had previously worked with Ray Bryant, Betty Carter, Etta Jones and Houston Person.

This the first recording made by saxophonist Allen Mezquida with Murphy, although Mezquida had been part of the inspiration for Murphy's "Song for the Geese" on the 1997 album Song for the Geese. Murphy heard Mezquida playing the melody of Sean Smith's song in a nightclub appearance with Smith's band and was inspired to write lyrics for the tune. "I never forgot the way he played," Mark said in the liner notes. Trumpeter Dave Ballou knew Murphy from a teaching job in Italy. "I was amazed at how he played outside the song harmonically," said Murphy. Ballou had previously recorded with Roseanna Vitro and Steve LaSpina.

Don Sickler suggested the bebop tunes on this album. Tadd Dameron's bebop tune "A Blue Time" later became "There's No More Blue Time" with Georgie Fame's lyrics added in the 1990s. Murphy said: "It's the most wonderful natural jazz tune. It's what I call a time song. It was almost written for a drummer to sing." "Bohemia After Dark" is a tribute to New York City jazz club Cafe Bohemia written by Oscar Pettiford. It became a Julian "Cannonball" Adderley staple in his live performances. The lyrics were added later by pianist Ronnie Whyte, a friend of Murphy's. "Mark's jagged scat chorus, with its yelps, trills, and leaps into falsetto, owes as much to the avant-garde of the '60s as it does to bop," writes Gavin. Cedar Walton's "Mosaic" recorded by Art Blakey and Jimmy Rowles became "Life's Mosaic" years later when lyrics were added by Joan and Paula Hackett. It was also recorded by Vanessa Rubin. Jazz pianist and composer James Williams, who worked with Art Blakey, wrote "You're My Alter Ego", his best known melody, with lyrics by Pamela Watson.

Gavin call the ballads on the album "painfully raw". Murphy previously recorded "That Old Black Magic" in 1958 on This Could Be the Start of Something with arrangement by Bill Holman, and it became a minor hit for Murphy. Peter Jones, in his Murphy biography This is Hip: The Life of Mark Murphy, says of Jimmy Rowles's "The Peacocks", it is "a terrifyingly difficult tune to sing, which Murphy nailed in one take". Murphy said of Norma Winstone's lyrics, "The way she twines in the words fascinated me. The song just takes you away to a different place." Rowles had previously accompanied Murphy on his Capitol Records albums, This Could Be the Start of Something, Mark Murphy's Hip Parade, and Playing the Field. Rowles had also been the pianist for singers Billie Holiday, Ella Fitzgerald, and Peggy Lee.

Argentine jazz pianist, singer and composer Sergio Mihanovich wrote the ballad "Sometime Ago". It has been recorded in instrumental versions by Cannonball Adderley, Bill Evans, Art Farmer, Stan Getz, Joe Pass, George Shearing, Clark Terry, and vocal versions by singers June Christy, Roseanna Vitro, Norma Winstone, and Irene Kral. "With Every Breath I Take" is from Cy Coleman's musical City of Angels with lyrics by David Zippel. Murphy often included the verse to standards in his recordings and in the closing ballad medley Murphy sings the rarely performed verse of "Why Was I Born?" by Jerome Kern and Oscar Hammerstein II. Speaking of Frank Sinatra's "I'm a Fool to Want You" Murphy said, "I've been fantasizing about doing that tune for twenty years," it is a "fantasy world" of "an older person, who lives a lot in memory".

== Reception ==
Professional ratings
Review scores
Source	Rating
AllMusic	2.5/5 stars
The Virgin Encyclopedia of Popular Music	4/5 stars
The Penguin Guide to Jazz	4/5 stars

AllMusic assigns the album 2.5 stars. David R. Adler writes: "One either loves Mark Murphy's style or one does not. The veteran vocalist is at his best when scatting...On the other hand, he seems a little rough-edged and indelicate on ballads". But he singles out for praise his be-bop scat on "There's No More Blue Time", his "breakneck version" of "That Old Black Magic", the hard bop "You're My Alter Ego" and "Life's Mosaic," the ballads "Some Time Ago", and the closing standards medley, "Why Was I Born? / I'm a Fool to Want You." He highly praises each of the accompanying musicians. He says, "Hip and adventurous, yet always tasteful, the band makes these tunes come alive as much as Murphy does".

Scott Yanow, in his book The Jazz Singers: The Ultimate Guide, includes the album in his list of "other worthy recordings of the past 20 years" by Mark Murphy.

Colin Larkin assigns the record 4 stars in The Virgin Encyclopedia of Popular Music. Four stars means, "Excellent. A high standard album from this artist and therefore highly recommended".

The Penguin Guide to Jazz Recordings assigns 4 qualified stars ***(*). This means "An excellent record, with some exceptional music, only kept out of the front rank by some minor reservations". Richard Cook and Brian Morton write, "Here approaching 70, Murphy has all the command and serene eloquence of the great jazz instrumental seniors. Of course the voice isn't the limber trumpet of his youth, but listeners shouldn't expect some kind of old man's wisdom as the premier emotion - "I'm A Fool To Want You", ... is as torn and uncomprehending as any tyro in romance could express. At the same time, it takes enormous mastery to make such a convincing, beautiful matter out of 'The Peacocks' (with Norma Winstone's exceptional lyric)".

Murphy biographer Peter Jones says: "Allen Mesquida on alto sax and Dave Ballou on trumpet (Murphy had met Ballou in Italy while both were teaching there)...are in dazzling form, the tracks being long enough for them to stretch out". He writes of Murphy's performance: "He keeps his scatting to a minimum, and amid the thrilling bebop of Cedar Walton's "Life's Mosaic" and "That Old Black Magic", there is also darkness. On the medley of "Why Was I Born?" and "I'm a Fool to Want You", the first done as a ballad, the second as a slow rhumba, Murphy sings some desperately sad and lonely a cappella lyrics, ruminating on the purpose of a life lived alone."

Will Friedwald said that "Murphy comes up with more good, not overdone tunes than just about anyone else.... As soon as he started singing 'The Peacocks', virtually every singer in New York started singing 'The Peacocks'."

Describing Murphy's voice and performance, James Gavin says that "time has only made his reedy bass-baritone richer. His vocal trademarks remain: the Ben Webster-like slides, the flashes of off-the-wall humor, the horn-player approach combined with a stark insight into words. He's not afraid to let his voice break or drop down to a husky whisper; pretty sounds alone would not suit the story he has to tell."

Joel Siegel praised the album in his JazzTimes review. He called the album one of Murphy's finest releases and found Murphy to be in excellent voice with first-rate accompanists. He wrote: "Murphy achieves an expressive breakthrough, communicating emotion with a simplicity and directness he’s never before achieved on record". He called Murphy "arguably the most influential jazz singer of his generation, not only as an artistic inspiration for younger performers but as a teacher, cheerleader and guest artist on the recordings of emerging vocalists. In many ways, he’s an excellent role model - restlessly creative, unwilling to compromise, constantly seeking new artistic challenges."

== Track listing ==
No.	Title	Lyrics	Music	Length
1.	"There's No More Blue Time"	Clive Powell (Georgie Fame)	Tadd Dameron	5:17
2.	"Peacocks" (Known as "A Timeless Place" with lyrics)	Norma Winstone	Jimmy Rowles	8:50
3.	"Bohemia After Dark"	Ronny Whyte	Oscar Pettiford	5:22
4.	"With Every Breath I Take"	David Zippel	Cy Coleman	5:12
5.	"You're My Alter Ego"	Pamela Watson	James Williams	6:15
6.	"Life's Mosaic"	John Hackett, Paula Hackett	Cedar Walton	6:30
7.	"Some Time Ago"	Sergio Mihanovich	Mihanovich	5:23
8.	"That Old Black Magic"	Johnny Mercer	Harold Arlen	5:38
9.	"Medley: Why Was I Born? / I'm a Fool to Want You"	Oscar Hammerstein II / Joel Herron, Frank Sinatra, Jack Wolf	Jerome Kern / Herron, Sinatra, Wolf	5:35
Total length:				54:00

== Personnel ==
Performance

- Mark Murphy – vocals, original concept
- Allan Mezquida – alto saxophone
- Steve LaSpina – bass (tracks 1, 2, 3, 5, 8)
- Sean Smith – bass (tracks 4, 6, 7, 9)
- Lee Musiker – piano, arranger
- Winard Harper – drums
- Dave Ballou – trumpet

Production

- Ira Yuspeh – engineer, recorded at M&I Recording Studios December 27–28, 1999, New York City, New York
- Don Sickler – producer, mixing
- Joe Fields – executive producer
- James Gavin – liner notes
- Annalee Valencia – art direction, design
- Bill Claxton – photography
