= Memo Acevedo =

- Born: Guillermo Memo Acevedo; Santa Fe de Bogotá, Colombia
- Genres: Afro-Cuban jazz, bossa nova, Latin jazz, rock, pop
- Occupations: Musician, bandleader, composer, educator
- Instruments: Drumset, Cuban, Brazilian & Colombian percussion
- Years active: 1967–present

Memo Acevedo is a drummer from Colombia who performs Latin/Brazilian jazz.

== Career ==
Born Guillermo 'Memo' Acevedo in Santa Fe de Bogotá, Colombia, he became as a young man a successful musician drumming for the pioneer Rock band 'The Flippers'(three years). Wanting to pursue further horizons he moved to Madrid, Spain where he lived for three years recording Blues/Rock and Pop with bands such as The Pekenikes(Spain);. Mexico became Acevedo's new playground for two years. By the mid-1970s, he moved to Toronto where we would remain for approximately two decades.

Starting in 1977 and continuing for almost twenty years, Acevedo led the Latin Jazz/Salsa band 'Banda Brava'. During this period, he also led Memo Acevedo and the Jazz Cartel. In 1986 joined the Humber College Percussion Faculty where he Founded and directed the first (in Canada) Cuban-Brazilian Jazz Ensemble, and taught private lessons on drum set & percussion for 10 years. Acevedo is included in the Canadian 'Who's Who'.

Most of Acevedo's recordings have been as a sideman. The exception is his self-produced 1993 album Building Bridges (Concord, 1993) which included guest performances by Tito Puente, Gonzalo Rubalcaba, Dave Valentin. He has worked with Bruce Cockburn, Irakere, Mark Murphy, Stephen Stills, Tom Scott, Gregory Hines, Frankie Valli and performed in The Lion King musical. He has also worked with The Propellerheads, Hilton Ruiz, Jackie and Roy, Toshiko Akiyoshi, Louie Bellson, Cachao, Joe Cuba and Vikki Carr among many.

In 1996 he moved to New York City where he was a professor at New York University (14 years), Drummers Collective (16 years), held numerous Clinics, workshops and performed as a free-lance musician beside leading his 10 piece band, Manhattan Bridges Orchestra, a.k.a. MBO.

He's been awarded the Percussive Arts Society President's Industry Award in 2011., the Montreal Drum Festival 'Lifetime Achievement' award, a JUNO award, (equivalent to the Grammy), two Jazz Report Magazine awards as 'best percussionist' 1994 and 1995, K0SA Music 'Lifetime achievement' award, the 'Gitana Tropical' Recognition award from Cuba's Ministry of Culture, The AD's National Award for best TV commercial, Rubbermaid's 'Unbeatable' (Composer/performer) and NYC's Lehman College Jazz Festival's 'Distinguish Artist' award.

Acevedo performed as guest faculty at the Yakima Valley Community College Latin Music Festival for nine years, and K0SA Percussion Camp for 13 years. He is a featured artist on the K0SA DVD (Hudson Music)'Lessons with the Masters'. He's the co-author of Drummers Collective book 'Afro-Caribbean & Brazilian Rhythms for the Drums'. He also created & designed his own drum stick 'Revolution', manufactured and promoted by the Promark stick company, and previously Regal Tip.

== Discography ==
- Building Bridges (1993, The Jazz Alliance)
