= Anthony Hall =

Anthony Hall may refer to:

- Anthony Hall (antiquarian) (1679–1723), English clergyman and academic
- Anthony Hall (criminal) (1937–2011), British convicted murderer
- Anthony Hall (athlete) (born 1950), American javelin thrower
- Anthony Hall (conspiracy theorist), Canadian former professor and conspiracy theorist
- Anthony Michael Hall (born 1968), American actor
- Anthony William Hall (1898–1947), UK royalty claimant
- J. Anthony Hall, British software engineer

== See also ==
- Tony Hall (disambiguation)
- St. Anthony Hall, an undergraduate literary society
