= Laurence Gardner =

British author and lecturer

- Born: Barry Laurence Gardner; 17 May 1943; Hackney, London, United Kingdom
- Died: 12 August 2010 (aged 67)
- Occupation: Author

Laurence Gardner (17 May 1943 – 12 August 2010) was a British author and lecturer. He wrote on various topics including historical-religious speculation such as the Jesus bloodline.

== Biography ==
Laurence Gardner was born Barry Laurence Gardner in Hackney, London. He was married to Angela and they had one child together and two children from a previous marriage. He was a stockbroker before becoming an author. Gardner was also an artistic painter, working alone and with Canadian artist Peter Robson, and was also known in the United States for his radio telephone-ins. He was involved with the AngloAmerican Lorna Doone Society, Dulverton, UK, along with Dr.Whitman Pearson USA and both were instrumental in commissioning the Lorna Doone statue that stands at the Exmoor NP entrance, Dulverton. His first books, authored as Barry Gardner, were "Who Was Lorna Doone" 1989 Brendon Arts Limited and "Lorna Doone's Exmoor" 1990 B.A.L. (Ref.Lorna's Author: A Statue and a Stone 2019 David Blackmore, Blackmore Books, Chester, UK) It is notable that Gardner's later work, Bloodline, is dedicated to Pearson. Gardner's book Bloodline of the Holy Grail was published during 1996. The book was serialized in The Daily Mail and was a best seller. He used his books to propose several theories, including a belief that Jesus and Mary Magdalene had married and had children, whose descendants included King Arthur and the House of Stuart. In Lost Secrets of the Sacred Ark he claimed that the Ark of the Covenant was a machine for manufacturing "monatomic gold" – a supposed elixir which could be used to extend life. His books also included theories about Freemasonry, the Knights Templar, the Holy Grail, and proposed connections between Atenism and Judaism.

Gardner referred to himself as "Chevalier Labhran de Saint Germain", and "Presidential Attaché to the European Council of Princes" (the existence of which cannot be verified) also "Prior of the Celtic Churches Sacred Kindred of Saint Columba". He also claimed to be Jacobite Historiographer Royal of the Royal House of Stewart. He was an endorser of Michel Roger Lafosse, in particular his claims to be descended from the House of Stuart, which Gardner claimed was descended from Jesus Christ. Some historians and scholars regard him as a conspiracy theorist, and treat his work as pseudohistory. Lafosse's claims have been dismissed.

Gardner was interviewed for the Killing Joke music documentary film later released in 2013, The Death and Resurrection Show, in which he stated that, "The Christian God is an Extraterrestrial".

Gardner died on 12 August 2010 after a prolonged illness. His book, The Origin of God, was published in 2010 as a print on demand book from the Dash House Publishing Company, established by his widow. It is described as "a biographical exploration of the deiform character variously known as Yahweh, Allah, or simply The Lord. It seeks to uncover and evaluate his original identity...". His final book Revelation of the Devil, a companion to The Origin of God, was published by Dash in 2012.

== Bibliography ==
- Bloodline of the Holy Grail: The Hidden Lineage of Jesus Revealed (1996) (ISBN 1-85230-870-2)
- Genesis of the Grail Kings: The Astonishing Story of the Ancient Bloodline of Christ and the True Heritage of the Holy Grail (1999) (ISBN 0553817744)
- Illustrated Bloodline of the Holy Grail (2000) (ISBN 1862047707)
- Bloodline of the Holy Grail: The Hidden Lineage of Jesus Revealed, Author's Special Edition (2001) (ISBN 1-903773-06-7)
- Realm of the Ring Lords: The Myth and Magic of the Grail Quest (2003) (ISBN 1931412146)
- Lost Secrets of the Sacred Ark: Amazing Revelations of the Incredible Power of Gold (2004) (ISBN 0-00-714295-1)
- The Magdalene Legacy: The Jesus and Mary Bloodline Conspiracy (2005) (ISBN 0007200854)
- The Shadow of Solomon: The Lost Secret of the Freemasons Revealed (2005) (ISBN 1578634040)
- The Grail Enigma: The Hidden Heirs of Jesus and Mary Magdalene (2008) (ISBN 0007266944)
- The Origin of God (2010) (ISBN 9780956735706)
- Revelation of the Devil (2012) (ISBN 9780956735744)
