= Lucia Oskerova =

Slovak actress (born 1990)

- Lucia Oskerová
- Born: 1990 (age 35–36); Bratislava, Czechoslovakia
- Occupation: Actress
- Years active: 2004–present
- Spouse: Anthony Michael Hall (m. 2020)
- Children: 1

Lucia Hall (née Oskerova; born 1990) is a Slovak-Canadian actress, business owner, and former model.

== Early life ==
Lucia Oskerova was born in Bratislava, Slovakia, which was then a part of Czechoslovakia. She graduated with a degree in Design and Architecture from the British Columbia Institute of Technology.

== Career ==
Oskerova, who began her career at the age of fifteen, became a Fashion Week star, walking for Dolce & Gabbana, Prada, Dior, Chanel, Fashion Rocks, Leone, Bob oli and Vetrina. Oskerova is best known for playing in films and such as Smallville (2005) and Once Upon a Time in Hollywood (2019).

Oskerova is the owner of BrowLush, a business that offers beauty services in West Los Angeles.

== Personal life ==
She has been in a relationship with actor Anthony Michael Hall since the summer of 2016. They became engaged on 7 September 2019, and married in 2020. In February 2023, she and her husband, Anthony Michael Hall, announced that they were expecting their first child. Their son was born in June 2023.

Oskerova speaks four languages and enjoys travelling.

== Filmography ==
=== Film ===
Year	Title	Role	Notes
2004	White Chicks	Fashion model	uncredited
2006	Windup	Russian spy	
2009	National Lampoon's Ratko: The Dictator's Son	Teuta	
2009	Driven to Kill	Beautiful woman	uncredited
2015	The Tragedy	Anna	
2017	War Machine	Parisian	uncredited
2018	Adolescence	Roller girl	
2018	The Last Sharknado: It's About Time	Luzia Ozer	
2019	Once Upon a Time in Hollywood	Jay Sebring's date	uncredited
2019	VHYes	Stardust	
2020	Human Zoo	Casting director	
2020	TMI	Janet Pace	
2021	South by Southwest	Brenda Page	
2023	Diane	Diane Harris	Main role
2023	The Discernment	Nadia	
2023	A Good Girl	Kim	

=== Television ===
Year	Title	Role	Notes
2005	Smallville	Sorority girl	one episode
2006	Very Bad Men	Rhonda	one episode
2007	Painkiller Jane	Model Rebbeca	one episode
2007	About a Girl	Sarah	one episode
2008	Battlestar Galactica: The Face of the Enemy	Cylon	one episode
2009	The Guard	Climbing woman	one episode
2012	Bir zamanlar Osmanli: Kiyam	Kumru	one episode
2015	Z Nation	Loveable Leslie	one episode
2016	Conan	Model Lucia	
2016	Dirty Talk	Nicole	
2018	9-1-1	Hot Blonde	uncredited
2020	Get Me Out	Michelle	
2021	The Fog of Murder	Ranae	one episode
2021	Atypical	Lemon	one episode
2026	Nation's Dumbest	self	episode 9: 'Family Teacher Conference'; reality show where her husband, Anthony Michael Hall, was a contestant
