= Tony Hall =

Tony Hall may refer to:

- Tony P. Hall (born 1942), American politician, representative and ambassador
- Tony Hall, Baron Hall of Birkenhead (born 1951), former Director-General of the BBC
- Tony Hall (Australian footballer) (born 1964), Australian rules footballer
- Tony Hall (California politician) (born 1942), former member of San Francisco Board of Supervisors
- Tony Hall (footballer, born 1969), played for East Fife, Berwick and some Irish clubs
- Tony Hall (journalist), South African journalist and member of the South African Congress of Democrats
- Tony Hall (music executive) (1928–2019), British music executive and former record producer and DJ
- Tony Hall (musician), American bassist, guitarist and vocalist from New Orleans
- Tony Hall (botanist), Kew Gardens Expert, former manager of the Alpine House; see List of botanists by author abbreviation (T–V)

== See also ==
- Anthony Hall (disambiguation)
