= Nation's Dumbest =

American game show

- Genre: Game show; Reality show
- Based on: Norges dummeste
- Directed by: Harbinder Singh
- Presented by: Jack Whitehall
- Country of origin: United States
- Original language: English
- No. of seasons: 1
- No. of episodes: 10

Production
- Executive producers: Ryan O'Dowd; Krystal Whitney; Jenny Groom; James Breen; Michael O'Sullivan
- Camera setup: Multi-camera
- Running time: 43-44 minutes
- Production companies: Montreaux Films; Insight Productions; BBC Studios; Fox Entertainment

Original release
- Network: Fox
- Release: July 15, 2026 – present

Nation's Dumbest is an American game reality show that premiered on Fox on July 15, 2026. Hosted by Jack Whitehall, the series is based on the Norwegian game show of the same name.

On October 27, 2026, the series was renewed for a second season.

== Format ==
Twelve celebrities compete against each other in educational-style challenges to prove they are not the "nation's dumbest".

Each episode is divided into four challenges. The first is an individual logic puzzle the contestant must complete within an allotted time limit, the second are individual challenges set within a classroom where the contestant must get the correct answer, and the third is a physical team-based challenge. If there are 3 contestants left, the team challenge is replaced with a solo field challenge.

Throughout the first three challenges, the contestants compete for gold stars, which correspond to the number of answers they can get wrong in the final challenge, referred to as the "final exam". Contestants start off with two stars and will gain a star if they win a challenge or lose one if they lose a challenge. No contestant can have more than three stars or less than one.

In the final exam, the remaining contestants are asked increasingly difficult trivia questions by the host. When a contestant loses all of their gold stars by answering incorrectly, they "flunk" and remain in the competition for another week. The last remaining contestant "graduates" and is removed from the competition. In the final episode, the contestants will gain an extra podium with 3 extra stars during the final exam. The last remaining contestant at the end is declared the "winner" and earns the title of "nation's dumbest".

Contestants who fail to participate in two challenges are disqualified, or "expelled", from the competition.

== Contestants ==
Contestant	Notability	Age	Residence	Result
Elle King	Singer-Songwriter	37	Nashville, Tennessee	Graduated 1st on July 15, 2026
Dr. Drew Pinsky	Television Personality/Physician	67	Pasadena, California	Graduated 2nd on July 22, 2026
Andrew Yang	Entrepreneur/Former Presidential Candidate	51	Manhattan, New York	Graduated 3rd on July 29, 2026
Carmen Electra	Actress/Model	54	Los Angeles, California	Expelled on August 5, 2026
Jon Heder	Actor	48	Vancouver, Washington	Graduated 4th on August 5, 2026
Steve-O	Stunt Performer/Comedian	52	Sumner County, Tennessee	Graduated 5th on August 12, 2026
Ice-T	Rapper/Actor	68	Edgewater, New Jersey	Graduated 6th on August 19, 2026
Matt Leinart	Former NFL Quarterback	43	Manhattan Beach, California	Graduated 7th on August 26, 2026
JoJo Siwa	Singer/Performer	23	Palm Springs, California	Graduated 8th on September 2, 2026
Anthony Michael Hall	Actor	58	Playa del Rey, Los Angeles	Graduated 9th on September 9, 2026
Hilaria Baldwin	Television Personality	42	Greenwich Village, New York	Graduated 10th on September 16, 2026
Chase Hudson	Musician/Influencer	24	Los Angeles, California	Nation's Dumbest on September 16, 2026

== Elimination table ==
Place	Contestant	Episodes									
Place	Contestant	1	2	3	4	5	6	7	8	9	10
11th	Chase	6th	9th	5th	4th	7th	5th	4th	3rd	3rd	DUMBEST
10th	Hilaria	4th	10th	8th	6th	3rd	2nd	2nd	2nd	2nd	GRAD
9th	Anthony Michael	8th	5th	9th	8th	6th	4th	5th	4th	GRAD	
8th	JoJo	11th	2nd	2nd	7th	4th	6th	3rd	GRAD		
7th	Matt	5th	8th	4th	5th	2nd	3rd	GRAD			
6th	Ice-T	10th	11th	7th	2nd	5th	GRAD				
5th	Steve-O	3rd	3rd	6th	3rd	GRAD					
4th	Jon	9th	6th	3rd	GRAD						
Expelled	Carmen	12th	7th	10th	EXPE						
3rd	Andrew	2nd	4th	GRAD							
2nd	Dr. Drew	7th	GRAD								
1st	Elle	GRAD									

== Production ==
On November 4, 2025, it was announced that Fox had ordered the series. On May 7, 2026, it was announced that the series would premiere on July 15, 2026, with the host and contestants announced on the same date.

On October 27, 2026, the series was renewed for a second season.

== Episodes ==
No.	Title	Original release date	Prod. code	U.S. viewers (millions)	Rating (18-49)
1	"Back to School"	July 15, 2026	NAD-101	1.99	0.3/5
Episode 1 Results: Logic Test: Homecoming Sash: Ice-T: Lost the challenge and was sent to the classroom.; Matt: Won the challenge and was sent to the classroom.; JoJo: Won the challenge and was sent to the classroom.; Andrew: Lost the challenge and was sent to the classroom.; Jon: Won the challenge and was sent to the classroom.; Chase: Lost the challenge and was sent to the classroom.; Dr. Drew: Lost the challenge and was sent to the classroom.; Anthony Michael: Lost the challenge and was sent to the classroom.; Hilaria: Lost the challenge and was sent to the classroom.; Steve-O: Lost the challenge and was sent to the classroom.; Carmen: Lost the challenge and was sent to the classroom.; Elle: Won the challenge and was sent to the classroom.; Logic Test Results: Hilaria: 1 star; Carmen: 1 star; Anthony Michael: 1 star; Jon: 3 stars; Chase: 1 star; Ice-T: 1 star; Elle: 3 stars; Matt: 3 stars; Dr. Drew: 1 star; Steve-O: 1 star; JoJo: 3 stars; Andrew: 1 star; The Classroom: First Round: Chase: Charles Darwin is credited with being the father of what theory?; Answer: Gravity (INCORRECT/Correct Answer: Evolution); Carmen: What color do you get by mixing red and blue paint?; Answer: Purple (CORRECT); Elle: What is the name of the process by which natural forces like water, wind or ice wear away at the Earth?; Answer: Eroding (CORRECT); Ice-T: What do you play a bongo drum with?; Answer: Your hands (CORRECT); Matt: What is at the center of our Solar System?; Answer: The sun (CORRECT); Hilaria: The 3 Primary Branches of the U.S. government are the Executive, the Legislative, and what?; Answer: Judicial (CORRECT); Andrew: What exercise combines a squat, plank, pushup, and jump in one fluid movement?; Answer: A squat thrust (INCORRECT/Correct Answer: A burpee); Anthony Michael: Question never shown; Answer: (INCORRECT/Correct Answer: Answer never shown); Jon: Question never shown; Answer: (INCORRECT/Correct Answer: Answer never shown); Dr. Drew: Question never shown; Answer: (CORRECT; Answer never shown); Steve-O: Question never shown; Answer: (CORRECT; Answer never shown); JoJo: Question never shown; Answer: (INCORRECT/Correct Answer: Answer never shown); First Round Results: Hilaria: 2 stars; Carmen: 2 stars; Anthony Michael: 1 star; Jon: 2 stars; Chase: 1 star; Ice-T: 2 stars; Elle: 3 stars; Matt: 3 stars; Dr. Drew: 2 stars; Steve-O: 2 stars; JoJo: 2 stars; Andrew: 1 star; Second Round (Animals): Stand on an animal that lays eggs.; Hilaria: Platypus (CORRECT); Carmen: Lizard (CORRECT); Anthony Michael: Scorpion (INCORRECT); Jon: Turtle (CORRECT); Chase: Rooster (INCORRECT); Ice-T: Duck (CORRECT); Elle: Ostrich (CORRECT); Matt: Armadillo (INCORRECT); Dr. Drew: Fish (CORRECT); Steve-O: Penguin (CORRECT); JoJo: Snail (CORRECT); Andrew: Owl (CORRECT); Stand on an animal that can run faster than Usain Bolt.; Hilaria: Moose (CORRECT); Carmen: Rabbit (CORRECT); Jon: Hippo (INCORRECT); Ice-T: Giraffe (CORRECT); Elle: Ostrich (CORRECT); Dr. Drew: Cheetah (CORRECT); Steve-O: Alligator (INCORRECT); JoJo: Horse (CORRECT); Andrew: Bear (CORRECT); Stand on an animal that is a carnivore.; Hilaria: Owl (CORRECT); Carmen: Gorilla (INCORRECT/Correct answer: Herbivore); Ice-T: Rhino (INCORRECT); Elle: Cheetah (CORRECT); Dr. Drew: Bear (INCORRECT/Correct answer: Omnivore); JoJo: Snake (CORRECT); Andrew: Alligator (CORRECT); Second Round Results: Hilaria: 3 stars; Carmen: 1 star; Anthony Michael: 1 star; Jon: 1 star; Chase: 1 star; Ice-T: 1 star; Elle: 3 stars; Matt: 2 stars; Dr. Drew: 1 star; Steve-O: 1 star; JoJo: 3 stars; Andrew: 2 stars; Team Challenge: Geography: Team Hilaria: Hilaria, Chase, Matt, Dr. Drew, Steve-O, Andrew (WINNERS); The Colosseum (Italy) (CORRECT); The Sphinx (Egypt) (CORRECT); Mount Rushmore (North Dakota) (INCORRECT/Correct Answer: South Dakota); Team Elle: Elle, Carmen, Anthony Michael, Jon, Ice-T, JoJo; Mount Everest (Nepal; incorrectly said Pakistan) (CORRECT); Christ the Redeemer (Brazil) (CORRECT); The Sphinx (Libya) (INCORRECT/Correct Answer: Egypt); Stonehenge (England; failed to place in time); Team Challenge Results: Hilaria: 3 stars; Carmen: 1 star; Anthony Michael: 1 star; Jon: 1 star; Chase: 2 stars; Ice-T: 1 star; Elle: 3 stars; Matt: 3 stars; Dr. Drew: 2 stars; Steve-O: 2 stars; JoJo: 3 stars; Andrew: 3 stars; Final Exam: Question 1: What is the nickname of the trophy handed out at the Academy Awards?; Answer: Oscar; Question 2: What part of a cow produces milk?; Answer: Udder; Question 3: What day of the month is Cinco de Mayo celebrated on?; Answer: 5th; Question 4: YouTuber James Stephen "Jimmy" Donaldson is known online by what nickname?; Answer: MrBeast; Question 5: What music star has a product line named Fenty Beauty?; Answer: Rihanna; Question 6: What kind of doctor specializes in treating feet?; Answer: Podiatrist; Question 7: What does the Latin phrase "Carpe Diem" mean in English?; Answer: Seize the Day; Question 8: Who played Katniss Everdeen in the Hunger Games movies?; Answer: Jennifer Lawrence; Question 9: What is the name of the family dog on The Simpsons?; Answer: Santa's Little Helper; Question 10: What popular Mexican food's name translates to "Little Donkey" in English?; Answer: Burrito; Question 11: What famous actor/director was born Albert Einstein?; Answer: Albert Brooks; Question 12: What is the world's biggest island?; Answer: Greenland; Final Exam Results: Carmen: First one sent back to the classroom.; Answers Right: N/A; Answers Wrong: 1 (Incorrectly answered Woman; lost all stars); JoJo: Second one sent back to the classroom.; Answers Right: N/A; Answers Wrong: 1 (Incorrectly answered Gold Guys; 2 stars remained), 2 (Incorrectly answered Nipple; 1 star remained), 3 (Incorrectly answered 15th; lost all stars); Ice-T: Third one sent back to the classroom.; Answers Right: 1, 2 (Misspelled it as Utters), 3; Answers Wrong: 4 (Incorrectly answered JSJD; lost all stars); Jon: Fourth one sent back to the classroom.; Answers Right: 1, 2, 3, 4; Answers Wrong: 5 (Incorrectly answered Beyoncé; lost all stars); Dr. Drew: Fifth one sent back to the classroom.; Answers Right: 1, 2 (Misspelled it as Utter), 3; Answers Wrong: 4 (Incorrect answer not shown; 1 star remained), 5 (Incorrectly answered J.Lo (Jennifer Lopez); lost all stars); Anthony Michael: Sixth one sent back to the classroom.; Answers Right: 1, 2, 3, 4; Answers Wrong: 5 (Incorrectly answered SZA; lost all stars); Chase: Seventh one sent back to the classroom.; Answers Right: 1, 2 (Misspelled it as Utters), 3, 5; Answers Wrong: 4 (Incorrect answer not shown; 1 star remained), 6 (Incorrectly answered Pediologist; lost all stars); Matt: Eighth one sent back to the classroom.; Answers Right: 1, 3, 4, 6; Answers Wrong: 2 (Incorrectly answered Teet; 2 stars remained), 5 (Incorrectly answered Swift (Taylor Swift); 1 star remained), 7 (Incorrectly answered Sophisticated; lost all stars); Hilaria: Ninth one sent back to the classroom.; Answers Right: 1, 2, 3, 4, 5, 6; Answers Wrong: 7 (Incorrectly answered Fair; 2 stars remained), 8 (Incorrectly answered Not AB (Alec Baldwin); 1 star remained), 9 (Incorrectly answered Fido; lost all stars); Steve-O: Tenth one sent back to the classroom.; Answers Right: 1, 2, 3, 4, 6, 7, 8; Answers Wrong: 5 (Incorrectly answered Miley Cyrus; 1 star remained), 9 (Incorrectly answered Baxter; lost all stars); Andrew: Eleventh one sent back to the classroom.; Answers Right: 1, 2, 3, 4, 5, 6, 7, 8, 9; Answers Wrong: 10 (Incorrectly answered El Poco Mole; 2 stars remained), 11 (Incorrectly answered Woody Allen; 1 star remained), 12 (Incorrectly answered Antarctica; lost all stars); Elle: Graduated with 1 star.; Answers Right: 1, 2 (Misspelled it as Utters), 3, 4, 5, 6, 7, 8, 9, 10; Answers Wrong: 11 (Incorrectly answered Alfred Hitchcock; 2 stars remained), 12 (Incorrectly answered Easter; 1 star remained); Graduated: Elle
2	"Airhead-to-Head"	July 22, 2026	NAD-102	1.61	0.3/4
Episode 2 Results: Logic Test: Lightbulb: Hilaria: Lost the challenge and was sent to the classroom.; Chase: Lost the challenge and was sent to the classroom.; Matt: Lost the challenge and was sent to the classroom.; Jon: Won the challenge and was sent to the classroom.; Anthony Michael: Lost the challenge and was sent to the classroom.; JoJo: Won the challenge and was sent to the classroom.; Ice-T: Won the challenge and was sent to the classroom.; Steve-O: Won the challenge and was sent to the classroom.; Andrew: Won the challenge and was sent to the classroom.; Dr. Drew: Lost the challenge and was sent to the classroom.; Carmen: Won the challenge and was sent to the classroom.; Logic Test Results: Hilaria: 1 star; Carmen: 3 stars; Anthony Michael: 1 star; Jon: 3 stars; Chase: 1 star; Ice-T: 3 stars; Matt: 1 star; Dr. Drew: 1 star; Steve-O: 3 stars; JoJo: 3 stars; Andrew: 3 stars; The Classroom: First Round: Chase: Second balloon popped.; What is the eighth month of the year?; Answer: August (CORRECT); What was the 50th state to join the U.S.?; Answer: Hawaii (CORRECT); If you are listing the U.S. States alphabetically, which comes last?; Answer: (PASSED/Correct Answer: Wyoming); Dr. Drew: Won the round.; What is the fifth word of The Star-Spangled Banner?; Answer: See (CORRECT); True or False: Wearing double the condoms will give you double the protection.; Answer: False (CORRECT); Anthony Michael: First balloon popped.; How many U.S. States begin with the letter "F"?; Answer: 1 (CORRECT); What pair of organs in the body take in oxygen and expel carbon dioxide?; Answer: The nose (INCORRECT/Correct Answer: The lungs); What is the last letter in this question?; Answer: N (CORRECT); Carmen: Won the round.; What are the two egg-shaped male reproductive glands responsible for producing testosterone?; Answer: Testicles (CORRECT); How many letters are there in the word alphabet?; Answer: 24 (INCORRECT/Correct Answer: 8); What is the last word in the classic "Happy Birthday" song?; Answer: You (CORRECT); Second Round: Ice-T: Third balloon popped.; What does 3+2 equal?; Answer: 5 (CORRECT); What is the only method of contraception that is 100% risk-free?; Answer: Something sex (INCORRECT/Correct Answer: Abstinence); Steve-O: Fourth balloon popped.; What day of the month is Christmas celebrated on?; Answer: December 25th (CORRECT); What is at the end of the word rainbow?; Answer: (WASN'T ABLE TO ANSWER/Correct Answer: W); Matt: Won the round.; What is the third letter of the alphabet?; Answer: C (CORRECT); JoJo: Won the round.; True or False: You can't get pregnant if you have intercourse in a pool.; Answer: False (CORRECT); Third Round: Jon: Sixth balloon popped.; What is the biological process of developing or coming of age during adolescence called?; Answer: Puberty (CORRECT); In the nursery rhyme "Little Jack Horner," what did he pull out of his pie?; Answer: (PASSED/Correct Answer: A plum); What singer had a hit song with "Sexual Healing" in 1982?; Answer: Marvin Gaye (CORRECT); Andrew: Fifth balloon popped.; What two months of the year have exactly five letters?; Answer: March and April (CORRECT); True or False: Female condoms exist.; Answer: (PASSED/Correct Answer: True); Question never shown; Answer: 1 (INCORRECT/Correct Answer: Answer never shown); Question never shown; Answer: Archaeologist (INCORRECT/Correct Answer: Answer never shown); Hilaria: Won the round.; A popular term for getting intimate on a date is Netflix and ____?; Answer: Sex (INCORRECT/Correct Answer: Chill); Popular television dermatologist Sandra Lee is better known by what name?; Answer: Dr. Pimple Popper (CORRECT); The Classroom Results: Hilaria: 2 stars; Carmen: 3 stars; Anthony Michael: 1 star; Jon: 2 stars; Chase: 1 star; Ice-T: 2 stars; Matt: 2 stars; Dr. Drew: 2 stars; Steve-O: 2 stars; JoJo: 3 stars; Andrew: 2 stars; Team Challenge: Spelling Beam: Team JoJo: JoJo, Chase, Steve-O, Dr. Drew, Anthony Michael, Andrew (WINNERS); Mistake (CORRECT); February (CORRECT); Haphazard (CORRECT); Etiquette (INCORRECT; misspelled as ettiquette) (Jojo was the first one out); Mischief (INCORRECT; misspelled as mischef) (Chase was the second one out); Team Carmen: Carmen, Hilaria, Matt, Ice-T, Jon; Phlegm (INCORRECT; misspelled as Fhlegm) (Carmen was the first one out); Embarrass (INCORRECT; misspelled as Embarass) (Hilaria was the second one out); Guarantee (INCORRECT; misspelled as Garantee) (Matt was the third one out); Ticklish (CORRECT); Privilege (INCORRECT; misspelled as privelege) (Ice-T was the fourth one out); Team Challenge Results: Hilaria: 1 star; Carmen: 2 stars; Anthony Michael: 2 stars; Jon: 1 star; Chase: 2 stars; Ice-T: 1 star; Matt: 1 star; Dr. Drew: 3 stars; Steve-O: 3 stars; JoJo: 3 stars; Andrew: 3 stars; Final Exam: Question 1: What does the letter "G" stand for in the popular acronym ROYGBIV?; Answer: Green; Question 2: In the nursery rhyme, what frightened Miss Muffet away?; Answer: A spider; Question 3: In cosmetic surgery, what does "BBL" stand for?; Answer: Brazilian Butt Lift; Question 4: If you are wearing a pair of thongs, what do you have on?; Answer: Sandals or Flip Flops; Question 5: In the snack "Ants on a log," what are the ants?; Answer: Raisins or Chocolate Chips; Question 6: What letter designates the most common blood type in humans?; Answer: O; Question 7: What is the main ingredient in tofu?; Answer: Soybeans; Question 8: What is the largest land animal native to North America?; Answer: Bison; Final Exam Results: Ice-T: First one sent back to the classroom.; Answers Right: N/A; Answers Wrong: 1 (Incorrectly answered Gangster; lost all stars); Hilaria: Second one sent back to the classroom.; Answers Right: N/A; Answers Wrong: 1 (Incorrectly answered Greak; lost all stars); Chase: Third one sent back to the classroom.; Answers Right: N/A; Answers Wrong: 1 (Incorrectly answered Genius; 1 star remained), 2 (Incorrectly answered Puppet; lost all stars); Matt: Fourth one sent back to the classroom.; Answers Right: 1; Answers Wrong: 2 (Incorrectly answer not shown; lost all stars); Carmen: Fifth one sent back to the classroom.; Answers Right: 2; Answers Wrong: 1 (Incorrectly answered Gabriel; 1 star remained), 3 (Incorrectly answered Big Bubble Booty; lost all stars); Jon: Sixth one sent back to the classroom.; Answers Right: 1, 2; Answers Wrong: 3 (Incorrectly answered Big Boob Lift; lost all stars); Anthony Michael: Seventh one sent back to the classroom.; Answers Right: 2; Answers Wrong: 1 (Incorrectly answered Giving; 1 star remained), 3 (Incorrectly answered Big Booty Love; lost all stars); Andrew: Eighth one sent back to the classroom.; Answers Right: 1, 2, 5 (Answered Raisins); Answers Wrong: 3 (Incorrectly answered Big Bariatric Liposuction; 2 stars remained), 4 (Incorrectly answered A bathing suit; 1 star remained), 6 (Incorrectly answered Type A; lost all stars); Steve-O: Ninth one sent back to the classroom.; Answers Right: 3, 4 (Answered Sandals), 5 (Answered Chocolate), 6; Answers Wrong: 1 (Incorrectly answered Great; 2 stars remained), 2 (Incorrectly answer not shown; 1 star remained), 7 (Incorrectly answered Curds; lost all stars); JoJo: Tenth one sent back to the classroom.; Answers Right: 1, 3, 4 (Answered Shoes), 5 (Answered Raisins), 6; Answers Wrong: 2 (Incorrectly answered Puppet; 2 stars remained), 7 (Incorrectly answered Mushroom; 1 star remained), 8 (Incorrectly answered Horse; lost all stars); Dr. Drew: Graduated with 1 star.; Answers Right: 2, 3, 4 (Answered Sandal Shoes "Flip Flops"), 6, 7, 8; Answers Wrong: 1 (Incorrectly answered Go; 2 stars remained), 5 (Incorrectly answered Peanuts; 1 star remained); Graduated: Dr. Drew
3	"Duel of Fools"	July 29, 2026	NAD-103	1.58	0.3/5
Episode 3 Results: Logic Test: Water Bottle: Andrew: Won the challenge and was sent to the classroom.; Anthony Michael: Lost the challenge and was sent to the classroom.; Steve-O: Lost the challenge and was sent to the classroom.; Hilaria: Won the challenge and was sent to the classroom.; Chase: Won the challenge and was sent to the classroom.; Ice-T: Won the challenge and was sent to the classroom.; Matt: Won the challenge and was sent to the classroom.; Jon: Won the challenge and was sent to the classroom.; JoJo: Won the challenge and was sent to the classroom.; Carmen: Absent; Logic Test Results: Hilaria: 3 stars; Carmen: 1 star; Anthony Michael: 1 star; Jon: 3 stars; Chase: 3 stars; Ice-T: 3 stars; Matt: 3 stars; Steve-O: 1 star; JoJo: 3 stars; Andrew: 3 stars; Final Test Rankings: #1. Andrew; #2. Steve-O; #3. Anthony Michael & Hilaria; #4. JoJo & Matt; #5. Jon, Chase & Ice-T; #6. Carmen; The Classroom: Chess Club: Match 1: Andrew vs. Steve-O; Andrew: (WINNER) (0:07); In what state is Seattle located?; Answer: Washington (CORRECT); What is the most popular search engine in the world?; Answer: Google (CORRECT); What is the name for an animal doctor?; Answer: Veterinarian (CORRECT); Apart from World Champion, what is the highest title a player can earn in chess?; Answer: Grandmaster (CORRECT); What Breaking Bad spinoff series told the story of a lawyer, Saul Goodman?; Answer: Better Call Saul (CORRECT); Steve-O: Arachnophobia is the fear of what?; Answer: Spiders (CORRECT); What gas is typically used to fuel an outdoor grill?; Answer: Propane (CORRECT); What actor stars as the title character in the John Wick films?; Answer: Keanu Reeves (CORRECT); What is the name of the living snowman, played by Josh Gad, in the movie Frozen?; Answer: Frosty (INCORRECT/Correct Answer: Olaf); What famous vampire lives in a castle in Transylvania?; Answer: Dracula (CORRECT); What kind of animal is Brian Griffin in the TV show Family Guy?; Answer: (WASN'T ABLE TO ANSWER/Correct Answer: A dog); Match 2: Anthony Michael vs. Hilaria; Anthony Michael: The drink "Arnold Palmer" is half tea, and half what?; Answer: Lemonade (CORRECT); What popular movie series tells the love story between Bella Swan and Edward Cullen?; Answer: Twilight (CORRECT); Hilaria: (WINNER) (0:21); What city is the White House located in?; Answer: Washington D.C. (Anthony Michael accidentally answered before Hilaria); What is the more common name for a human cranium?; Answer: The brain (Anthony Michael accidentally answered before Hilaria/Correct Answer: The skull); What ancient Chinese medicine involves inserting needles to balance energy flow?; Answer: Acupuncture (CORRECT); Match 3: JoJo vs. Matt; JoJo: What sport is Serena Williams famous for playing?; Answer: Tennis (CORRECT); Aretha Franklin is known as the "Queen of" what?; Answer: Soul (CORRECT); In what type of clothing are you likely to find a Windsor knot?; Answer: (PASSED/Correct Answer: Dress shirts); What is the nickname for the legendary Loch Ness Monster?; Answer: (PASSED/Correct Answer: Nessie); The butterfly, freestyle, and breaststroke are all types of what?; Answer: Swimming strokes (CORRECT); Question never continued.; Matt: (WINNER) (0:07); What was the first ever cryptocurrency?; Answer: (PASSED/Correct Answer: Bitcoin); What Italian city is famous for its canals?; Answer: Venice (CORRECT); What kind of acid makes lemons sour?; Answer: Citric (CORRECT); In what city did the famous Boston Tea Party take place?; Answer: Boston (CORRECT); Match 4: Chase vs. Jon; Chase: What is the Spanish word for "no"?; Answer: No (CORRECT); What rock singer is known as "The Boss"?; Answer: (PASSED/Correct Answer: Bruce Springsteen); What are the blood vessels that carry blood away from the heart called?; Answer: (PASSED/Correct Answer: Arteries, arterioles, and the aorta); In what continent can you find the world's biggest rainforest?; Answer: South America (CORRECT); What cartoon featured a psychedelic van called the "Mystery Machine"?; Answer: Scooby-Doo (CORRECT but ran out of time); Jon: (WINNER) (0:20); What does the "L" in BLT stand for?; Answer: Lettuce (CORRECT); What NBA legend's nickname is King James?; Answer: (PASSED/Correct Answer: LeBron James); What word starting with the letter "B" is the name for a severe snowstorm?; Answer: Blizzard (CORRECT); Match 5: Carmen vs. Ice-T; Carmen: What color dress is typically worn by brides in the U.S.?; Answer: White (CORRECT); In the fairy tale The Ugly Duckling what does the duckling grow up to be?; Answer: Ugly (INCORRECT/Correct Answer: A beautiful swan); What country is the comic book superhero Black Panther from?; Answer: (PASSED/Correct Answer: Wakanda); Grandmaster Flash was a pioneer of what kind of music?; Answer: Hip-Hop (CORRECT); Jack White is the lead singer of what Rock and Roll Hall of Fame band?; Answer: (WASN'T ABLE TO ANSWER/Correct Answer: The White Stripes); Ice-T: (WINNER) (0:26); How many rings are there in the Olympic logo?; Answer: 5 (CORRECT); Sodium Chloride is the scientific name for what?; Answer: Salt (CORRECT); The Classroom Results: Hilaria: 3 stars; Carmen: 1 star; Anthony Michael: 1 star; Jon: 3 stars; Chase: 2 stars; Ice-T: 3 stars; Matt: 3 stars; Steve-O: 1 star; JoJo: 2 stars; Andrew: 3 stars; Team Challenge: Picture Day: Team Jon: Jon, Hilaria, Carmen, Ice-T, Steve-O; Team JoJo: Jojo, Anthony Michael, Chase, Matt, Andrew (WINNERS); Team Challenge Results: Hilaria: 2 stars; Carmen: 1 star; Anthony Michael: 2 stars; Jon: 2 stars; Chase: 3 stars; Ice-T: 2 stars; Matt: 3 stars; Steve-O: 1 star; JoJo: 3 stars; Andrew: 3 stars; Final Exam: Question 1: According to her 2006 hit song, what part of Shakira's anatomy "Don't Lie"?; Answer: Hips; Question 2: In what sport might you use the terms birdie, bogey, and bunker?; Answer: Golf; Question 3: What is the northernmost state in the U.S.?; Answer: Alaska; Question 4: What messaging app with a ghost as its logo allows viewers to share photos that disappear after being viewed?; Answer: Snapchat; Question 5: How many bagels are in a baker's dozen?; Answer: 13; Question 6: What are people from Switzerland called?; Answer: Swiss; Question 7: Chicago boasts two Major League Baseball Clubs: The Cubs and what other team?; Answer: White Sox; Question 8: What artist is known for his "Blue Period"?; Answer: Pablo Picasso; Question 9: The slang term "iced out" means something covered in what?; Answer: Diamonds; Question 10: What continent is India a part of?; Answer: Asia; Final Exam Results: Carmen: First one sent back to the classroom.; Answers Right: 1; Answers Wrong: 2 (Incorrectly answered Soccer; lost all stars); Anthony Michael: Second one sent back to the classroom.; Answers Right: 2; Answers Wrong: 1 (Incorrectly answered The Booty; 1 star remained), 3 (Incorrectly answered Washington S.T.; lost all stars); Hilaria: Third one sent back to the classroom.; Answers Right: 1, 3, 4; Answers Wrong: 2 (Incorrectly answered Badminton and misspelled it as Bad Mitton; 1 star remained), 5 (Incorrectly answered 12; lost all stars); Ice-T: Fourth one sent back to the classroom.; Answers Right: 1, 2, 3; Answers Wrong: 4 (Incorrectly answered Telegraph; 1 star remained), 5 (Incorrectly answered 12; lost all stars); Steve-O: Fifth one sent back to the classroom.; Answers Right: 1, 2, 3, 4, 5; Answers Wrong: 6 (Incorrectly answered Swedes; lost all stars); Chase: Sixth one sent back to the classroom.; Answers Right: 1, 2, 4, 6; Answers Wrong: 3 (Incorrectly answered Maine; 2 stars remained), 5 (Incorrectly answered 6; 1 star remained), 7 (Incorrectly answered Black Sox; lost all stars); Matt: Seventh one sent back to the classroom.; Answers Right: 1, 2, 4, 6, 7; Answers Wrong: 3 (Incorrectly answered Maine; 2 stars remained), 5 (Incorrectly answered 12; 1 star remained), 8 (Incorrectly answered Van Gogh (Vincent van Gogh); lost all stars); Jon: Eighth one sent back to the classroom.; Answers Right: 1, 2, 3, 4, 5, 6, 7; Answers Wrong: 8 (Incorrectly answered Jay-Z; 1 star remained), 9 (Incorrectly answered Bullets; lost all stars); JoJo: Ninth one sent back to the classroom.; Answers Right: 1, 2, 4, 5, 6, 7, 9; Answers Wrong: 3 (Incorrectly answered Maine; 2 stars remained), 8 (Incorrectly answered Warhol (Andy Warhol); 1 star remained), 10 (Incorrectly answered Africa; lost all stars); Andrew: Graduated with 2 stars.; Answers Right: 1, 2, 3, 4, 5, 6, 7, 9 (Answered Diamonds/Jewelry), 10; Answers Wrong: 8 (Incorrectly answered Van Gogh (Vincent van Gogh); 2 stars remained); Graduated: Andrew
4	"Feud for Thought"	August 5, 2026	NAD-104	1.75	0.3/5
Episode 4 Results: Logic Test: Pitcher: Jon: Won the challenge and was sent to the classroom.; Chase: Lost the challenge and was sent to the classroom.; JoJo: Lost the challenge and was sent to the classroom.; Steve-O: Lost the challenge and was sent to the classroom.; Anthony Michael: Lost the challenge and was sent to the classroom.; Ice-T: Won the challenge and was sent to the classroom.; Matt: Won the challenge and was sent to the classroom.; Hilaria: Won the challenge and was sent to the classroom.; Carmen: Lost the challenge and was sent to the classroom.; Logic Test Results: Hilaria: 3 stars; Carmen: 1 star; Anthony Michael: 1 star; Jon: 3 stars; Chase: 1 star; Ice-T: 3 stars; Matt: 3 stars; Steve-O: 1 star; JoJo: 1 star; The Classroom: Balloons: Jon: In what country is the Leaning Tower of Pisa located? (Nominates Ice-T) (BALLOON POPPED/1 REMAINING); What classic board game features characters like Professor Plum, Miss Scarlet, and Colonel Mustard? (Nominated by Ice-T); Answer: Clue (CORRECT); What kind of meat is prosciutto?; Answer: Beef (INCORRECT/Correct Answer: Ham) (BALLOON POPPED/NONE REMAINING); Carmen: In the children's game "Duck, Duck, Goose," what word triggers a player to chase and tag the one who is "it"?; Answer: Go (INCORRECT/Correct Answer: Goose) (BALLOON POPPED/1 REMAINING); What dinosaur's name literally means "three-horned face"?; Answer: Rhino (INCORRECT/Correct Answer: Triceratops) (BALLOON POPPED/NONE REMAINING); Chase: What is the human body's largest organ? (Nominated by Anthony Michael); Answer: Skin (INCORRECT/Correct Answer: Skin) (BALLOON POPPED/1 REMAINING); Question never shown; Answer never shown (INCORRECT) (BALLOON POPPED/NONE REMAINING); JoJo: Who was the first President of the United States during the first moon landing?; Answer: Kennedy (John F. Kennedy) (INCORRECT/Correct Answer: Richard Nixon) (BALLOON POPPED/1 REMAINING); Question never shown; Answer never shown (INCORRECT) (BALLOON POPPED/NONE REMAINING); Ice-T: In what country is the Leaning Tower of Pisa located? (Nominated by Jon); Answer: Italy (CORRECT); What classic board game features characters like Professor Plum, Miss Scarlet, and Colonel Mustard? (Nominates Jon) (BALLOON POPPED/1 REMAINING); Anthony Michael: What is the human body's largest organ? (Nominates Chase); The original nicknames of the members of the Spice Girls were Ginger, Posh, Scary, Baby and What? (Nominates Hilaria) (BALLOON POPPED/1 REMAINING); Hilaria: The original nicknames of the members of the Spice Girls were Ginger, Posh, Scary, Baby and What? (Nominated by Anthony Michael); Answer: Sporty (CORRECT); Question never shown; Answer: Gymnastics (CORRECT); Matt: What social media influencer fought Mike Tyson in a boxing match in 2024?; Answer: Jake Paul (CORRECT); Steve-O: Question never shown; Answer: Jorts (CORRECT); The Classroom Results: Hilaria: 3 stars; Carmen: 1 star (TIMEOUT); Anthony Michael: 2 stars; Jon: 2 stars; Chase: 1 star; Ice-T: 3 stars; Matt: 3 stars; Steve-O: 2 stars; JoJo: 1 star; Team Challenge: Wheel: Team Ice: Ice-T, Chase, Steve-O, Jon (4:50) (WINNERS); Wheel: Steve-O; Team Hilaria: Hilaria, Anthony Michael, Matt, JoJo (6:47); Wheel: Hilaria; Team Challenge Results: Hilaria: 2 stars; Carmen: 1 star (EXPELLED); Anthony Michael: 1 star; Jon: 3 stars; Chase: 2 stars; Ice-T: 3 stars; Matt: 2 stars; Steve-O: 3 stars; JoJo: 1 star; Expelled: Carmen Final Exam: Question 1: What kind of animal is the animated star of the TV series Bluey?; Answer: Dog; Question 2: What are you munching on if you are eating a muffuletta?; Answer: Sandwich; Question 3: What is the lowest rank in the U.S. Army?; Answer: Private; Question 4: Which of the famous Kardashian sisters is the oldest?; Answer: Kourtney Kardashian; Question 5: In slang, it someone asks you to give them some "guap," "fetti," or "skrilla," what are they asking for?; Answer: Money; Question 6: What are pyromaniacs obsessed with?; Answer: Fire; Question 7: Question never shown; Answer: Rhode Island; Question 8: Question never shown; Answer: Colonoscopy; Question 9: What color is the cue ball in a game of pool?; Answer: White; Question 10: In Hinduism, what animal is considered most scared?; Answer: Cow; Question 11: What music superstar had a number one hit in 1986 on the U.S. Billboard Hot 100 with the song "How Will I Know"?; Answer: Whitney Houston; Final Exam Results: Anthony Michael: First one sent back to the classroom.; Answers Right: 1; Answers Wrong: 2 (Incorrectly answered Pastry; lost all stars); JoJo: Second one sent back to the classroom.; Answers Right: 1; Answers Wrong: 2 (Incorrectly answered Muffin; lost all stars); Hilaria: Third one sent back to the classroom.; Answers Right: 1; Answers Wrong: 2 (Incorrectly answered Muffin top; 1 star remained), 3 (Incorrectly answered Soldier; lost all stars); Matt: Fourth one sent back to the classroom.; Answers Right: 1; Answers Wrong: 2 (Incorrectly answered Muffin; 1 star remained), 3 (Incorrectly answered Cadet; lost all stars); Chase: Fifth one sent back to the classroom.; Answers Right: 1; Answers Wrong: 2 (Incorrectly answered Muffin; 1 star remained), 3 (Incorrectly answered Soldier; lost all stars); Steve-O: Sixth one sent back to the classroom.; Answers Right: N/A; Answers Wrong: 1 (Incorrectly answered Whale; 2 stars remained), 2 (Incorrectly answered Baked Snack; 1 star remained), 3 (Incorrectly answered Cadet; lost all stars); Ice-T: Seventh one sent back to the classroom.; Answers Right: 1, 3, 5, 6, 7 (Misspelled it as Rode Island), 8 (Misspelled it as Colon Ostapy), 9, 10; Answers Wrong: 2 (Incorrectly answered Muffin; 2 stars remained), 4 (Incorrectly answered Kim; 1 star remained), 11 (Incorrectly answered Michael Jackson; lost all stars); Jon: Graduated with 1 star.; Answers Right: 1, 3, 5, 6, 7, 8, 9, 10, 11; Answers Wrong: 2 (Incorrectly answered Mushroom; 2 stars remained), 4 (Incorrectly answered Kloe (Khloé); 1 star remained); Graduated: Jon
5	"The Midterms"	August 12, 2026	NAD-105	1.69	0.3/4
Episode 5 Results: Logic Test: Tic-Tac-Toe - Chair Edition: Anthony Michael: Lost the challenge and was sent to the classroom.; Chase: Lost the challenge and was sent to the classroom.; Steve-O: Won the challenge and was sent to the classroom.; JoJo: Won the challenge and was sent to the classroom.; Ice-T: Won the challenge and was sent to the classroom.; Hilaria: Won the challenge and was sent to the classroom.; Matt: Won the challenge and was sent to the classroom.; Logic Test Results: Hilaria: 3 stars; Anthony Michael: 1 star; Chase: 1 star; Ice-T: 3 stars; Matt: 3 stars; Steve-O: 3 stars; JoJo: 3 stars; The Classroom: First Round: True or False; True or False? The blood inside your body is blue in color. (Correct Answer: False); Hilaria: True (INCORRECT); Anthony Michael: False (CORRECT); Chase: False (CORRECT); Ice-T: True (INCORRECT); Matt: True (INCORRECT); Steve-O: False (CORRECT); JoJo: True (INCORRECT); Clementine the Class Hamster: False (CORRECT); True or False? The Mona Lisa painting is currently missing her eyebrows. (Correct Answer: True); Hilaria: True (CORRECT); Anthony Michael: True (CORRECT); Chase: False (INCORRECT); Ice-T: False (INCORRECT); Matt: True (CORRECT); Steve-O: False (INCORRECT); JoJo: True (CORRECT); Clementine the Class Hamster: True (CORRECT); True or False? Adding salt to cooking water will help it boil faster. (Correct Answer: False); Hilaria: False (CORRECT); Anthony Michael: False (CORRECT); Chase: True (INCORRECT); Ice-T: True (INCORRECT); Matt: False (CORRECT); Steve-O: False (CORRECT); JoJo: True (INCORRECT); Clementine the Class Hamster: True (INCORRECT); True or False? Identical twins have the same fingerprints. (Correct Answer: False); Hilaria: True (INCORRECT); Anthony Michael: False (CORRECT); Chase: False (CORRECT); Ice-T: False (CORRECT); Matt: False (CORRECT); Steve-O: False (CORRECT); JoJo: False (CORRECT); Clementine the Class Hamster: False (CORRECT); True or False? Lighters were invented before matches. (Correct Answer: True); Hilaria: False (INCORRECT); Anthony Michael: False (INCORRECT); Chase: False (INCORRECT); Ice-T: False (INCORRECT); Matt: False (INCORRECT); Steve-O: False (INCORRECT); JoJo: False (INCORRECT); Clementine the Class Hamster: True (CORRECT); Mystery Guest: Clementine the Class Hamster; First Round Results: Hilaria: 3 stars; Anthony Michael: 1 star; Chase: 1 star; Ice-T: 3 stars; Matt: 3 stars; Steve-O: 3 stars; JoJo: 3 stars; Second Round: Text Message; Chase: BOGO; Answer: (PASSED/Correct Answer: Buy One, Get One); Matt: ROFL; Answer: Return Off from Leave (INCORRECT/Correct Answer: Rolling on the Floor Laughing); Ice-T: TTYL; Answer: (PASSED/Correct Answer: Talk to You Later); Hilaria: TBT; Answer: To Be There (INCORRECT/Correct Answer: Throwback Thursday); Anthony Michael: OOTD; Answer: (PASSED/Correct Answer: Outfit of the Day); JoJo: IMHO; Answer: In My Honest Opinion (CORRECT) (In My Humble Opinion); Steve-O: IYKYK; Answer: If You Know, You Know (CORRECT); Second Round Results: Hilaria: 2 stars; Anthony Michael: 1 star; Chase: 1 star; Ice-T: 2 stars; Matt: 2 stars; Steve-O: 3 stars; JoJo: 3 stars; Team Challenge: Frogs Intestines: Team Anthony Michael: Anthony Michael, Chase, JoJo (4:18); Team Steve-O: Steve-O, Ice-T, Hilaria, Matt (2:17) (WINNERS); Team Challenge Results: Hilaria: 3 stars; Anthony Michael: 1 star; Chase: 1 star; Ice-T: 3 stars; Matt: 3 stars; Steve-O: 3 stars; JoJo: 2 stars; Final Exam: Question 1: In what town was Lincoln's Gettysburg Address given?; Answer: Gettysburg, Pennsylvania; Question 2: Where is an appropriate place to insert a dongle?; Answer: Headphone Jack/Computer; Question 3: What is The Little Mermaid's name in the Disney films?; Answer: Ariel; Question 4: In the original comic book, what fictional city is Batman from?; Answer: Gotham City; Question 5: In rapper Sir Mix-a-Lot's song "Baby Got Back," what specific animal does he say "Don't Want None"?; Answer: Anaconda; Question 6: A bowler, pork pie & fez are all types of what?; Answer: Hats; Question 7: What device is nicknamed a "One-Armed Bandit"?; Answer: Slot Machine; Final Exam Results: Chase: First one sent back to the classroom.; Answers Right: N/A; Answers Wrong: 1 (Incorrectly answered Washington D.C.; lost all stars); Anthony Michael: Second one sent back to the classroom.; Answers Right: 1 (Answered Gettysburg); Answers Wrong: 2 (Incorrectly answered Throat; lost all stars); Ice-T: Third one sent back to the classroom.; Answers Right: N/A; Answers Wrong: 1 (Incorrectly answered Georgetown; 2 stars remained), 2 (Incorrectly answered Mouth; 1 star remained), 3 (Passed/Didn't know; lost all stars); JoJo: Fourth one sent back to the classroom.; Answers Right: 2 (Answered Headphone Jack), 3; Answers Wrong: 1 (Incorrectly answered Philly (Philadelphia); 1 star remained), 4 (Incorrectly answered New York; lost all stars); Hilaria: Fifth one sent back to the classroom.; Answers Right: 3, 4; Answers Wrong: 1 (Incorrectly answered Philadelphia; 2 stars remained), 2 (Incorrectly answered A Donkey Muzzle; 1 star remained), 5 (Incorrectly answered Dog; lost all stars); Matt: Sixth one sent back to the classroom.; Answers Right: 1 (Answered Gettysburg), 3, 4, 5; Answers Wrong: 2 (Incorrectly answered Ears; 2 stars remained), 6 (Incorrectly answered Dessert; 1 star remained), 7 (Incorrectly answered Watch; lost all stars); Steve-O: Graduated with 2 stars.; Answers Right: 1 (Answered Gettysburg), 2 (Answered Computer), 3, 4, 5, 6; Answers Wrong: 7 (Incorrectly answered Radio Device; 2 stars remained); Graduated: Steve-O
6	"Study Buddy Day"	August 19, 2026	NAD-106	1.82	0.3/4
Episode 6 Results: Logic Test: Pedestals: Chase/Ice-T: Lost the challenge and was sent to the classroom.; Anthony Michael/Matt: Lost the challenge and was sent to the classroom.; Hilaria/JoJo: Won the challenge and was sent to the classroom.; Logic Test Results: Hilaria: 3 stars; Anthony Michael: 1 star; Chase: 1 star; Ice-T: 1 star; Matt: 1 star; JoJo: 3 stars; The Classroom: First Round: Color Team; What kids' television show starred the pair of friends Bert and Ernie?; Blue Team; Ice-T; Answer: Peppa Pig (INCORRECT/Correct Answer: Sesame Street); What is the name of a female deer?; Red Team; Matt; Answer: Doe (CORRECT); Where did Gayle King and Katy Perry travel to together on the Blue Horizon in 2025?; Red Team; Matt; Answer: Space (CORRECT); On what part of the body is a durag traditionally worn?; Blue Team; Hilaria; Answer: The head (CORRECT); A labradoodle is a hybrid dog created by crossing what two breeds?; Yellow Team; Anthony Michael; Answer: A Labrador and a Poodle (CORRECT); What is Pop superstar Prince's real first name?; Blue Team; Hilaria; Answer: Fred (INCORRECT/Correct Answer: Prince); First Round Teams; Yellow Team (Chase/Anthony Michael): Red Team (Matt/JoJo): (WINNERS); Blue Team (Ice-T/Hilaria): First Round Results: Hilaria: 2 stars; Anthony Michael: 2 stars; Chase: 2 stars; Ice-T: 1 star; Matt: 2 stars; JoJo: 3 stars; Second Round: Animal Team; Team Armadillo (Matt makes the animal sound); Hilaria; Answer: Rooster (CORRECT/Originally guessed Chicken before guessing the right answer); Cat (CORRECT); Rattlesnake (CORRECT/Originally guessed Boa Constrictor Snake before guessing the right answer); Horse (CORRECT); Gorilla (CORRECT/Originally guessed Monkey before guessing the right answer); Bird (Hummingbird)/Mouse (INCORRECT/Correct Answer: Dolphin); Team Scorpion (Anthony Michael makes the animal sound); JoJo; Answer: Dog (CORRECT); Donkey (CORRECT/Originally guessed Horse before guessing the right answer); Elephant (CORRECT/Originally guessed Horse before guessing the right answer); Bee (CORRECT); Tiger (CORRECT); Frog (INCORRECT/Correct Answer: Duck); Team Gecko (Ice-T makes the animal sound); Chase; Answer: Pig (CORRECT); Cow (CORRECT); Owl (CORRECT); Sheep (CORRECT); PASSED/Correct Answer: Turkey); Chimp (Chimpanzee) (CORRECT/Originally guessed Monkey and Orangutan before guessing the right answer) (Note: Originally thought to be incorrect until they reviewed the audio footage and saw that it was correct.); Second Round Teams; Team Scorpion (Anthony Michael/JoJo): 5 out of 6; Team Armadillo (Hilaria/Matt): 5 out of 6; Team Gecko (Chase/Ice-T): 4 out of 6; Second Round Results: Hilaria: 3 stars; Anthony Michael: 3 stars; Chase: 3 stars; Ice-T: 2 stars; Matt: 3 stars; JoJo: 3 stars; Team Challenge: U.S. History: Yellow Team (Hilaria/Matt): (2:16) (WINNERS); Red Team (Chase/Ice-T): (4:07) (RUNNER-UPS); Blue Team (Anthony Michael/JoJo): (4:37); Team Challenge Results: Hilaria: 3 stars; Anthony Michael: 2 stars; Chase: 3 stars; Ice-T: 3 stars; Matt: 3 stars; JoJo: 2 stars; Final Exam: Question 1: If someone has a natural ability for growing plants, they are said to have a green what?; Answer: Thumb; Question 2: The alphabet is made up of vowels and what other type of letters?; Answer: Consonants; Question 3: Write the number six in Roman numerals.; Answer: VI; Question 4: What are you if you are a sexagenarian?; Answer: 60s; Question 5: What R&B group, formed in 1978, was Bobby Brown a founding member of?; Answer: New Edition; Question 6: According to Greek legend, what was hidden inside of the Trojan Horse?; Answer: Soldiers/People/Weapons; Question 7: What did the letters originally stand for in the Rap-Rock performer MGK's name?; Answer: Machine Gun Kelly; Question 8: What Japanese and Brazilian martial art, popularized by the Gracie family, is a staple of MMA?; Answer: Jujutsu; Final Exam Results: JoJo: First one sent back to the classroom.; Answers Right: 2 (Misspelled it as Consinents); Answers Wrong: 1 (Incorrectly answered Mind; 1 star remained), 3 (Incorrectly answered XI; lost all stars); Chase: Second one sent back to the classroom.; Answers Right: 3; Answers Wrong: 1 (Incorrectly answered Gut; 2 stars remained), 2 (Incorrectly answered Non-Vowels; 1 star remained), 4 (Incorrectly answered Sex Scientist; lost all stars); Anthony Michael: Third one sent back to the classroom.; Answers Right: 1, 2, 3, 5; Answers Wrong: 4 (Incorrectly answered Sex Dr.; 1 star remained), 6 (Incorrectly answered Victory; lost all stars); Matt: Fourth one sent back to the classroom.; Answers Right: 1, 2, 3; Answers Wrong: 4 (Incorrectly answered Doctor of Sex; 2 stars remained), 5 (Incorrectly answered Milly Vanilly (Milli Vanilli); 1 star remained), 6 (Incorrectly answered Gold/Treasure; lost all stars); Hilaria: Fifth one sent back to the classroom.; Answers Right: 1, 2, 3, 4, 6 (Answered Weapons); Answers Wrong: 5 (Incorrectly answered I ♥ You Ice; 2 stars remained), 7 (Incorrectly answered I ♥ You Ice; 1 star remained), 8 (Incorrectly answered Tai Kwon Do; lost all stars); Ice-T: Graduated with 2 stars.; Answers Right: 1, 2 (Misspelled it as Consdents), 3, 5, 6 (Answered Soldiers), 7, 8; Answers Wrong: 4 (Incorrectly answered Sex Doctor; 2 stars remained); Graduated: Ice-T
7	"The Science Fair"	August 26, 2026	NAD-107	1.66	0.3/5
Episode 7 Results: Logic Test: Ping-Pong Ball: Hilaria: Won the challenge and was sent to the classroom.; JoJo: Won the challenge and was sent to the classroom.; Chase: Won the challenge and was sent to the classroom.; Matt: Won the challenge and was sent to the classroom.; Anthony Michael: Won the challenge and was sent to the classroom.; Logic Test Results: Hilaria: 3 stars; Anthony Michael: 3 stars; Chase: 3 stars; Matt: 3 stars; JoJo: 3 stars; The Classroom: First Round: Inventions; Hilaria: Pickleball; Answer: 1971 (INCORRECT/Correct Answer: 1965); Microwave; Answer: 1981 (INCORRECT/Correct Answer: 1945); Brassiere; Answer: 1914 (CORRECT) (Note: Originally incorrectly answered 1843 by Chase.); Fax Machine; Answer: 1965 (INCORRECT/Correct Answer: 1843); Mars Rover; Answer: 1963 (INCORRECT/Correct Answer: 1997); JoJo: Fax Machine; Answer: First Time: 1945 (INCORRECT/Correct Answer: 1843); Second Time: 1963 (INCORRECT/Correct Answer: 1843); Ring Doorbell; Answer: 2011 (CORRECT); Microwave; Answer: 1945 (CORRECT) (Note: Originally incorrectly answered 1981 by Hilaria.); Chase: Mars Rover; Answer: First Time: 1981 (INCORRECT/Correct Answer: 1997); Second Time: 1997 (CORRECT) (Note: Originally incorrectly answered 1963 by Hilaria.); Brassiere; Answer: 1843 (INCORRECT/Correct Answer: 1914); Email; Answer: 1971 (CORRECT) (Note: Originally incorrectly answered 1981 by Matt.); Fax Machine; Answer: 1843 (CORRECT) (Note: Originally incorrectly answered 1965 by Hilaria, 1945 and 1963 by Jojo, 1992 by Anthony Michael and 1981 by Matt.); Anthony Michael: Facebook; Answer: First Time: 1992 (INCORRECT/Correct Answer: 2004); Second Time: 2004 (CORRECT); iPod; Answer: 2001 (CORRECT); Fax Machine; Answer: 1992 (INCORRECT/Correct Answer: 1843); Matt: Email; Answer: 1981 (INCORRECT/Correct Answer: 1971); Bitcoin; Answer: 2008 (CORRECT); Fax Machine; Answer: 1981 (INCORRECT/Correct Answer: 1843); Pickleball; Answer: 1965 (CORRECT) (Note: Originally incorrectly answered 1971 by Hilaria.); First Round Results: Hilaria: 2 stars; Anthony Michael: 3 stars; Chase: 3 stars; Matt: 3 stars; JoJo: 3 stars; Second Round: JoJo: The Komodo dragon is the largest living species of what?; Answer: Dragon (INCORRECT/Correct Answer: Lizard); Anthony Michael: What is the biggest planet in our Solar System?; Answer: Earth (INCORRECT/Correct Answer: Jupiter); Hilaria: What color blood cells fight infection?; Answer: White (CORRECT); Chase: What organ in the human body produces the most insulin?; Answer: Intestines (INCORRECT/Correct Answer: Pancreas); Matt: What galaxy is Earth in?; Answer: Milky Way (CORRECT); Second Round Results: Hilaria: 3 stars; Anthony Michael: 2 stars; Chase: 2 stars; Matt: 3 stars; JoJo: 2 stars; Team Challenge: Volcano: Red Team: Hilaria, Matt, JoJo (WINNERS); Yellow Team: Anthony Michael, Chase; Team Challenge Results: Hilaria: 3 stars; Anthony Michael: 1 star; Chase: 1 star; Matt: 3 stars; JoJo: 3 stars; Final Exam: Question 1: H2O is the chemical formula for what?; Answer: Water; Question 2: According to popular superstition, breaking what will give you seven years of bad luck?; Answer: Mirror; Question 3: Halitosis is the medical term for what?; Answer: Bad Breath; Question 4: In the movie Ferris Bueller's Day Off, what major city does he visit?; Answer: Chicago; Question 5: If you're suffering from angina, what part of your body is in distress?; Answer: Heart; Final Exam Results: Anthony Michael: First one sent back to the classroom.; Answers Right: 1; Answers Wrong: 2 (Incorrectly answered Eye Contact; lost all stars); Chase: Second one sent back to the classroom.; Answers Right: 1; Answers Wrong: 2 (Incorrectly answered Promises; lost all stars); JoJo: Third one sent back to the classroom.; Answers Right: 1, 2; Answers Wrong: 3 (Incorrectly answered Loss of Hearing; 2 stars remained), 4 (Incorrectly answered NYC (New York City); 1 star remained), 5 (Incorrectly answered Esophagus (misspelled Aslogus); lost all stars); Hilaria: Fourth one sent back to the classroom.; Answers Right: 1, 2; Answers Wrong: 3 (Incorrectly answered Reflux; 2 stars remained), 4 (Incorrectly answered Los Angeles; 1 star remained), 5 (Incorrectly answered Throat; lost all stars); Matt: Graduated with 2 stars.; Answers Right: 1, 2, 3, 4; Answers Wrong: 5 (Incorrectly answered Legs/Feet; 2 stars remained); Graduated: Matt
8	"Not A Clue"	September 2, 2026	NAD-108	1.88	0.3/5
Episode 8 Results: Logic Test: Basketball Tower: Chase: Lost the challenge and was sent to the classroom.; Anthony Michael: Lost the challenge and was sent to the classroom.; Hilaria: Won the challenge and was sent to the classroom.; JoJo: Won the challenge and was sent to the classroom.; Logic Test Results: Hilaria: 3 stars; Anthony Michael: 1 star; Chase: 1 star; JoJo: 3 stars; The Classroom: First Round: Phrase of Saying; Hilaria vs. JoJo: JoJo: 3 Points (WINNER); Answer: Don't Cry Over Spilled Milk (CORRECT) (1 POINT); Answer: One Chance (INCORRECT/Correct Answer: Once Upon a Time) (1 POINT - Given to Hilaria); Answer: Head Over Heels in Love (CORRECT) (1 POINT); Hilaria: 2 Points; Answer: You Stand Up and Try Again (INCORRECT/Correct Answer: Try To Understand) (1 POINT - Given to JoJo); Answer: To Be or Not to Be (CORRECT) (1 POINT); Anthony Michael vs. Chase: Anthony Michael: 1 Point; Answer: Down Home Cooking (CORRECT) (1 POINT); Answer: See the World and Travel (INCORRECT/Correct Answer: Travel Overseas) (1 POINT - Given to Chase); Chase: 3 Points (WINNER); Answer: Back to Square One (CORRECT) (1 POINT); Answer: One in a Million (CORRECT) (1 POINT); Hilaria vs. Anthony Michael: Anthony Michael: Love At First Sight (CORRECT) (09:30); Hilaria: Time Heals All Wounds (CORRECT) (01:03) (WINNER); First Round Results: Hilaria: 3 stars; Anthony Michael: 1 star; Chase: 2 stars; JoJo: 3 stars; Second Round: English Quiz; Anthony Michael: 3 Points (WINNER); Spil the ______; Answer: Beans (CORRECT); Actions Speak _____; Answer: Lounder Than Words (CORRECT); The Straw That Broke _____; Answer: The Camel's Back (CORRECT); JoJo: 1 Point; Teamwork Makes the _____; Answer: Dream Work (CORRECT); Don't Look a Gift Horse in _____; Answer: The Eye (INCORRECT/Correct Answer: The Mouth); Two's Company ____; Answer: Is Better Than One (INCORRECT/Correct Answer: Three's a Crowd); Chase: 1 Point; The Best Thing Since _____; Answer: Applesause (INCORRECT/Correct Answer: Sliced Bread); Skibidi _____; Answer: Toilet (CORRECT); Stop and Smell the _____; Answer: Air (INCORRECT/Correct Answer: Roses); Hilaria: 2 Points; Don't Throw the Baby Out ____; Answer: With the Bath Water (CORRECT); Shape Up or _____; Answer: Go Away (INCORRECT/Correct Answer: Ship Out); A Penny Saved is _____; Answer: A Penny Earned (CORRECT); Second Round Results: Hilaria: 3 stars; Anthony Michael: 2 stars; Chase: 1 star; JoJo: 2 stars; Team Challenge: Crossword Puzzle: Team Anthony Michael: Anthony Michael, Hilaria; Team Chase: Chase, JoJo (WINNERS); Team Challenge Results: Hilaria: 2 stars; Anthony Michael: 1 star; Chase: 2 stars; JoJo: 3 stars; Final Exam: Question 1: A "Charley Horse" is a type of what?; Answer: Cramp; Question 2: The Pilgrims first arrived in America on what ship?; Answer: Mayflower; Question 3: A "Fender Stratocaster" is a type of world-famous what?; Answer: Guitar; Question 4: Who had a hit in 2015 with the song "Hotline Bling"?; Answer: Drake; Final Exam Results: Anthony Michael: First one sent back to the classroom.; Answers Right: N/A; Answers Wrong: 1 (Incorrectly answered Bruise; lost all stars); Chase: Second one sent back to the classroom.; Answers Right: N/A; Answers Wrong: 1 (Incorrectly answered Toy; 1 star remained), 2 (Incorrectly answered Mayweather; lost all stars); Hilaria: Third one sent back to the classroom.; Answers Right: 1, 2; Answers Wrong: 3 (Incorrectly answered Car; 1 star remained), 4 (Incorrectly answered I ♥ You JoJo; lost all stars); JoJo: Graduated with 2 stars.; Answers Right: 1, 2, 4; Answers Wrong: 3 (Incorrectly answered Mode of Transportation; 2 stars remained); Graduated: JoJo
9	"Family Teacher Conference"	September 9, 2026	NAD-109	N/A	TBA
Episode 9 Results: Family Members: Hilaria: Alec Baldwin (Husband); Anthony Michael: Lucia Hall (Wife; Chase: Cole Hudson (né Ellis) (Father; Logic Test: Colorful Path: Hilaria & Alec: Lost the challenge and was sent to the classroom.; Chase & Cole: Won the challenge and was sent to the classroom.; Anthony Michael & Lucia: Won the challenge and was sent to the classroom.; Logic Test Results: Hilaria: 1 star; Anthony Michael: 3 stars; Chase: 3 stars; Final Test Rankings: #1. TBA; #2. TBA; #3. TBA; The Classroom: Family Classroom Test: Anthony Michael & Lucia: Who is this?; Answer: William Shakespeare (CORRECT); What is this extinct animal?; Answer: Some form of dinosaur; The giant panda is widely recognized as the national animal of what country?; Answer: Australia (INCORRECT/Correct Answer: China); Chase & Cole: How many sides/faces does a cube have?; Answer: 6 (CORRECT); Known for his deadpan reactions to overcomplicated life hacks, who is the most followed TikTok influencer in the world?; Answer: Khaby Lame (CORRECT); Hilaria & Alec: Who is this?; Answer: (PASSED/Correct Answer: Joel McHale); In what state can you find Plymouth Rock?; Answer: Massachusetts (CORRECT); What is the first name of Cynthia Erivo's character in the movie Wicked?; Answer: Elphaba (CORRECT); The Classroom Results: Hilaria: 2 stars; Anthony Michael: 2 stars; Chase: 3 stars; Solo Field Challenge: Rickety Bridge: Chase: (7 CORRECT); What nursery rhyme tells the story of an egg-shaped character who had a "great fall"?; Answer: Humpty Dumpty (CORRECT); What ocean did the Titanic sink in?; Answer: Atlantic (CORRECT); How many strings does a violin have?; Answer: Four (CORRECT); What does the Spanish word "Baño" mean in English?; Answer: Bathroom (CORRECT); The company, Vans, is known primarily for what checkerboard-patterned product?; Answer: Shoes (CORRECT); What U.S. Disney theme park features Sleeping Beauty's castle?; Answer: Disney World (INCORRECT/Correct Answer: Disneyland); What singer had a hit with the song "Free Fallin'" in 1989?; Answer: The Fray (INCORRECT/Correct Answer: Tom Petty); What famous building did King Kong climb in the original film?; Answer: Empire State Building (CORRECT); What are the glands that make spit called?; Answer: Saliva (CORRECT); Besides flock, what is the name for a group of crows?; Answer: (WASN'T ABLE TO ANSWER/Correct Answer: Murder); Hilaria: (6 CORRECT); What is another name for the season commonly referred to as "Fall"?; Answer: Autumn (CORRECT); How many days are there in a leap year?; Answer: 28 (INCORRECT/Correct Answer: 366); Fashion designer Coco Chanel popularized the "Little Black" what back in 1926?; Answer: Dress (CORRECT); In what city can you find Tower Bridge, Buckingham Palace and St. Paul's Cathedral?; Answer: London (CORRECT); In what Middle-Eastern city is the Burj Khalifa, the tallest building in the world, located?; Answer: Dubai (CORRECT); What is the name of the profession that designs buildings?; Answer: Architecture (CORRECT); What is the only metal that is liquid at room temperature?; Answer: Mercury (CORRECT); How many minutes are there in three hours?; Answer: 100/200 (INCORRECT/Correct Answer: 180); What iconic singer is known as the "Piano Man"?; Answer: Elton John (INCORRECT/Correct Answer: Billy Joel); What Sandra Bullock movie features a city bus rigged with a bomb that will detonate if it drops below 50mph?; Answer: (PASSED/Correct Answer: Speed); What rapper dropped the 2024 diss track "Not Like Us"?; Answer: (PASSED/Correct Answer: Kendrick Lamar); What famous duo had a hit song in 1970 with "Bridge Over Troubled Water"?; Answer: Adele (INCORRECT/Correct Answer: Simon & Garfunkel); What U.S. city is home to the Space Needle?; Answer: (WASN'T ABLE TO ANSWER/Correct Answer: Seattle); Anthony Michael: (8 CORRECT); What extreme sport involves jumping from a height while attached to an elastic cord?; Answer: Bungee jumping (CORRECT); The Golden Gate Bridge connects Marin County and what major U.S. city?; Answer: San Francisco (CORRECT); How many eyes do most species of spider have?; Answer: None (INCORRECT/Correct Answer: Eight); How many syllables are there in the word "collapse"?; Answer: Two (CORRECT); What band had a hit song with "Bohemian Rhapsody"?; Answer: Queen (CORRECT); The beaver is the national animal of what North American country?; Answer: Canada (CORRECT); The Roman aqueducts were specifically designed to transport what?; Answer: Water (CORRECT); What was the main instrument played by Ringo Starr during his time with The Beatles?; Answer: Drums (CORRECT); What type of metal are soda cans most commonly made from?; Answer: Aluminum (CORRECT); Solo Field Challenge Results: Chase: 3 stars; Hilaria: 1 star; Anthony Michael: 3 stars; Final Exam: Question 1: What are spuds?; Answer: Potatoes; Question 2: What type of food is a Po' Boy?; Answer: Sandwich; Question 3: If she's not your aunt, what relationship does your uncle's only sister have with you?; Answer: Mother; Question 4: What artist's most recent tour was called the Eras Tour?; Answer: Taylor Swift; Question 5: How many S's are there in the word Mississippi?; Answer: 4; Question 6: "Barbenheimer" was the combined nickname given to what two movies released in July of 2023?; Answer: Barbie & Oppenheimer; Final Exam Results: Chase: First one sent back to the classroom.; Answers Right: N/A; Answers Wrong: 1 (Incorrectly answered A Food; 2 stars remained), 2 (Incorrectly answered Pastry; 1 star remained), 3 (Incorrectly answered Blood; lost all stars); Hilaria: Second one sent back to the classroom.; Answers Right: 1 (Answered Potato), 2, 3, 4, 5; Answers Wrong: 6 (Incorrectly answered Barbra Streisand & Oppenheimer; lost all stars); Anthony Michael: Graduated with 2 stars.; Answers Right: 1 (Answered Small Potatoes), 2, 3, 4, 6; Answers Wrong: 5 (Incorrectly answered 2; 2 stars remained); Graduated: Anthony Michael
10	"The Finals!"	September 16, 2026	NAD-110	N/A	TBA
Episode 10 Results: Logic Test: Bring a wolf, carrot, and rabbit across a bridge: Hilaria: Won the challenge and was sent to the classroom.; Chase: Won the challenge and was sent to the classroom.; Logic Test Results: Hilaria: 3 stars; Chase: 3 stars; The Classroom: First Round: Chase: Balloon popped.; What is the word "Wow" spelled backwards?; Answer: (PASSED/Correct Answer: Wow); What is the 25th letter of the alphabet?; Answer: Y (CORRECT); How many days are there in 3 weeks?; Answer: 21 (CORRECT); What is the national sport of Japan?; Answer: Ping Pong (INCORRECT/Correct Answer: Sumo Wrestling); What is the first letter in this question?; Answer: W (CORRECT); What month has just 3 letters?; Answer: (PASSED/Correct Answer: May); If an average person counts all their fingers and toes twice, what number will they get?; Answer: (WASN'T ABLE TO ANSWER/Correct Answer: 40); Hilaria: Won the round and balloon popped.; Which month of the year has the most letters?; Answer: (PASSED/Correct Answer: September); What U.S. state is nicknamed the "Empire State"?; Answer: New York (CORRECT); What is the name of Elvis Presley's final home?; Answer: (PASSED/Correct Answer: Graceland); What name will you get if you place the letters B-A-E in alphabetical order?; Answer: Abe (CORRECT); What is James Bond's favorite drink?; Answer: Martini - Shaken, not stirred (CORRECT); First Round Results: Hilaria: 3 stars; Chase: 2 stars; Second Round: Chess Club; Hilaria vs. Chase; Match 1: Animal; Hilaria: What animal is known as "Man's Best Friend"?; Answer: Dog (CORRECT); What kind of animal includes a hammerhead variety?; Answer: Shark (CORRECT); What animal is featured in a cultural tradition focused on predicting how long winter will be?; Answer: (PASSED/Correct Answer: Groundhog); What kind of dog is commonly nicknamed a "wiener" dog?; Answer: Dachshund (CORRECT); In the cartoon Tom and Jerry, what kind of animal is Jerry?; Answer: Mouse (CORRECT); What do chameleons use to strike prey from a distance?; Answer: (WASN'T ABLE TO ANSWER/Correct Answer: Tongue); Chase: (WINNER) (0:02); What kind of animal is ridden in the Kentucky Derby?; Answer: Horse (CORRECT); The male crocodile is often called a "bull." What is a female called?; Answer: (PASSED/Correct Answer: Cow); What organ do fish use to breath?; Answer: Gills (CORRECT); In the Harry Potter universe, what kind of animal does Harry use to deliver messages?; Answer: Owl (CORRECT); What is the name of the classic Disney movie that featured a flying elephant?; Answer: Dumbo (CORRECT); Match 2: Fashion; Chase: (WINNER) (0:01); What kind of clothing are chinos?; Answer: Pants (CORRECT); Fashion designer Stella McCartney is the daughter of what famous singer-songwriter?; Answer: (PASSED/Correct Answer: Paul McCartney); Which city hosts the annual Met Gala?; Answer: New York (CORRECT); Who wore a dress made of raw meat to the 2010 MTV Video Music Awards?; Answer: Lady Gaga (CORRECT); What type of clothing are Levi Strauss and Jacob William Davis credited with creating?; Answer: Jeans (CORRECT); What Italian city hosts one of the "Big Four" fashion weeks?; Answer: Milan (CORRECT); Hilaria: Stilettos are types of what?; Answer: Heels (CORRECT); What is the term "fit" in "fit check" short for?; Answer: (PASSED/Correct Answer: Outfit); What's another name for the catwalk that models walk down during fashion shows?; Answer: Runway (CORRECT); What does the French term "Prêt-À-Porter" mean in English?; Answer: (PASSED/Correct Answer: Ready-To-Wear); What do the letters GRWM stand for in the popular social media trend?; Answer: Get Ready With Me (CORRECT); What's the last name of the brother and sister fashion duo Gianni and Donatella?; Answer: Versace (CORRECT); Karl Lagerfeld sketched the iconic "Double F" logo for which luxury brand?; Answer: (WASN'T ABLE TO ANSWER'/Correct Answer: Fendi); Second Round Results: Hilaria: Match 1: 2 stars; Match 2: 1 star; Chase: 3 stars; Solo Field Challenge: School Bus: Chase: (5:52) (WINNER); What does the "F" in F1 Racing stand for?; Answer: Formula (CORRECT); Finish this classic 80s movie quote. "Say hello to my little ____"?; Answer: Friend (CORRECT); Hilaria: (6:29); What actor played Jack in the movie Titanic?; Answer: Leonardo DiCaprio (CORRECT); How many legs does an insect have?; Answer: Six (CORRECT); What biographical musical features music and lyrics by Lin-Manuel Miranda?; Answer: Hamilton (CORRECT); Solo Field Challenge Results: Hilaria: 1 star (Note: Got 3 extra stars for the final exam bringing the total to 4 stars); Chase: 3 stars (Note: Got 3 extra stars for the final exam bringing the total to 6 stars); Special Video Guests: Jon Heder, Dr. Drew Pinsky, Matt Leinart, Ice-T, Andrew Yang, Steve-O, Final Exam: Question 1: Finish this common saying: "Rome wasn't built in a ____"; Answer: Day; Question 2: What kind of fruit did the Evil Queen use to poison Snow White?; Answer: Apple; Question 3: Scamming someone online romantically with a fake persona is named after what animal?; Answer: Catfish; Question 4: What is the most common language spoken in Rome?; Answer: Italian; Question 5: Betsy Ross is legendarily credited with creating what?; Answer: American Flag; Question 6: The Huracán, Aventador, and Gallardo are all types of what?; Answer: Lamborghini; Question 7: Pumpernickel is a type of what?; Answer: Bread; Question 8: Botany is the study of what?; Answer: Plants; Question 9: What is the name of the coffee shop the characters on the TV show Friends frequented?; Answer: Central Perk; Question 10: What part of a human body is the "mandible" more commonly called?; Answer: Jaw; Question 11: What is the more common name for a sea cow?; Answer: Manatee; Question 12: Where are you most likely to find a Zamboni?; Answer: Ice Rink; Final Exam Results: Hilaria: Graduated with 2 stars.; Answers Right: 1, 2, 3, 4, 5, 7, 8, 9, 10, 12; Answers Wrong: 6 (Incorrectly answered Storms; 3 stars remained), 11 (Incorrectly answered Whale; 2 stars remained); Chase: Crowned Nation's Dumbest; Answers Right: 1, 2, 3 (Answered Catfishing), 4, 6, 11; Answers Wrong: 5 (Incorrectly answered Betty Boop; 5 stars remained), 7 (Incorrectly answered Cookie; 4 stars remained), 8 (Incorrectly answered Plastic Surgery; 3 stars remained), 9 (Incorrectly answered Le Cafe; 2 stars remained), 10 (Incorrectly answered Head; 1 star remained), 12 (Incorrectly answered Italy; lost all stars); Graduated: Hilaria Nation's Dumbest: Chase
