= Anthony William Hall =

- Born: 1898; Chiswick, Middlesex
- Died: December 1947 (aged 48–49); Little Dewchurch, Herefordshire
- Other names: King Anthony I, Anthony Tudor
- Occupation: Police Inspector
- Years active: ?–1927
- Employer: Shropshire Constabulary
- Known for: Pretender to the English throne
- Spouse: Ethel Brazier (1923–1939)
- Children: 1
- Parent(s): Ambrose and Mary Hall
- Relatives: Three brothers, one sister

Anthony William Hall (1898–1947), self-declared as King Anthony I and Anthony Tudor, was a man who claimed to be descended directly through the male line from Henry VIII and Anne Boleyn (from an illegitimate son, born before their marriage).

== Early life ==
Hall joined the Shropshire Constabulary after World War I as Police Constable 168. He was praised as a "first-class" photographer, shorthand-writer and typist, with a good working knowledge of fingerprinting. He was promoted to Police Inspector at the age of 28 but in 1927 abruptly resigned after a disagreement with his Chief Constable. He moved to Canada that year, where he broke up with his wife, who returned to the UK in December. He remained in Canada until April 1929. During the next decade, he lived in the city of Hereford and then London.

== Claims to the English throne ==
=== Background ===
Anthony William Hall claimed to be the direct male descendant of Henry VIII, the 11th in the line. According to his story, the line was founded by John Hall, a son of Henry VIII and Anne Boleyn, who was born prior to the King's marriage to Catherine of Aragon. Since Anne was not more than nine years old, possibly less, and since the English Crown does not descend to illegitimate children, the claim was ludicrous. At the same time as Hall was declaring his lineage, there was also a Jacobite pretender to the throne, Rupprecht, Crown Prince of Bavaria, as well as several others for monarchies on the European mainland.

=== Actions ===
In 1931, Hall attempted — in an "open letter", in the form of a pamphlet, to King George V, whom he addressed as "George Frederick Ernest Albert Windsor (alias Guelph)" — to claim the English throne. He also made many speeches, in Birmingham and elsewhere, in which he set out his claim and challenged the king to a duel, with the loser to be beheaded. He also set forth an agenda to deal with the national debt, for the dissolution of the Government of the United Kingdom, and the abolition of income tax. One of his more popular pledges was to increase the alcoholic strength of beer.

These claims were eventually raised with King George V, as records released in 2006 showed that the monarch had discussed this with the Private Secretary to the Sovereign, Sir Clive Wigram. In those notes, Wigram wrote in 1931, "His Majesty quite agrees that a stop should be put to his effusions but feels that it might not look very well for a man who is obviously demented to get six months imprisonment. Would it not be possible to keep him under observation with a view to his final detention in an institution, without actually putting him in prison."

Despite this request, Sir John Anderson at the Home Office decided that he was "not so obviously demented or insane that he could be dealt with without recourse to court proceedings."

Hall was said to have addressed over 1,000 meetings in a six-year period. He was arrested many times for using "scandalous language", and was fined and bound over to keep the peace. For example, in 1936 he appeared before a city magistrates' court in Hereford after attempting to hold a public meeting in St Peter's Square, charged with obstructing the free passage of the square, assaulting a local police inspector who intervened, and conducting himself "in a manner likely to cause a breach of the peace". He declared in the court that he would make Hereford his capital city and that he would establish royal mints "in every city in the country". When he was fined £20 he initially refused to pay, protesting that as their "lawful king" they could not demand it.

In London, which he pledged to rebuild to house 100 million people and where he served eviction notices to the king at Buckingham Palace, he was known to declare his claims loudly up to five times a day in the areas around Tower Hill and near the Woolwich Dockyard.

He also moved around the country to proclaim his claim, and sold slips of paper which he said would be the new currency once he ascended to the throne. In July 1937, he was fined £1 for selling those pamphlets in Southend, and during the court case he declared that his name was also Anthony Tudor. During his incarcerations, he was reviewed by two prison doctors who could not find evidence of any insanity, while one, Dr Hamblin Smith, said that Hall's ideas for resolving the national debt were not insane.

== Later life ==
In 1939, divorce proceedings were brought against him by his wife. During the court hearing, he conducted his own case and questioned his wife for more than six hours. In summing up, the judge said of Mr Hall, "He appears to be a man of tempestuous, undisciplined and erratic disposition. I have not formed the opinion that he is in any way a wholly bad man. He appears capable of generous and excellent impulses, but against that he is completely reckless in his actions." Mrs Hall was given a decree nisi plus costs, and full custody of their child. During the Second World War, he contested with his sister, Mary Hall, over his mother's house in Little Dewchurch. He had taken possession of the property and she was seeking to have him removed. His defence in the matter was that the Court of Probate Act 1857, although signed by Queen Victoria, had never reached royal assent and was therefore invalid to be used in a court of law. He declared that he was going to take the issue to the House of Lords. Instead, Judge Roope Reeve ruled against his case, and granted possession of the property to his sister in 28 days, but allowed him the following 14 days to make an appeal.

Hall died in Little Dewchurch in December 1947. Following his death, he was still referenced as a Pretender to the British throne as late as 1950.

== See also ==
- Michel Roger Lafosse, who claims descent from Charles Edward Stuart.
