= Anthony Michael Hall =

American actor (born 1968)

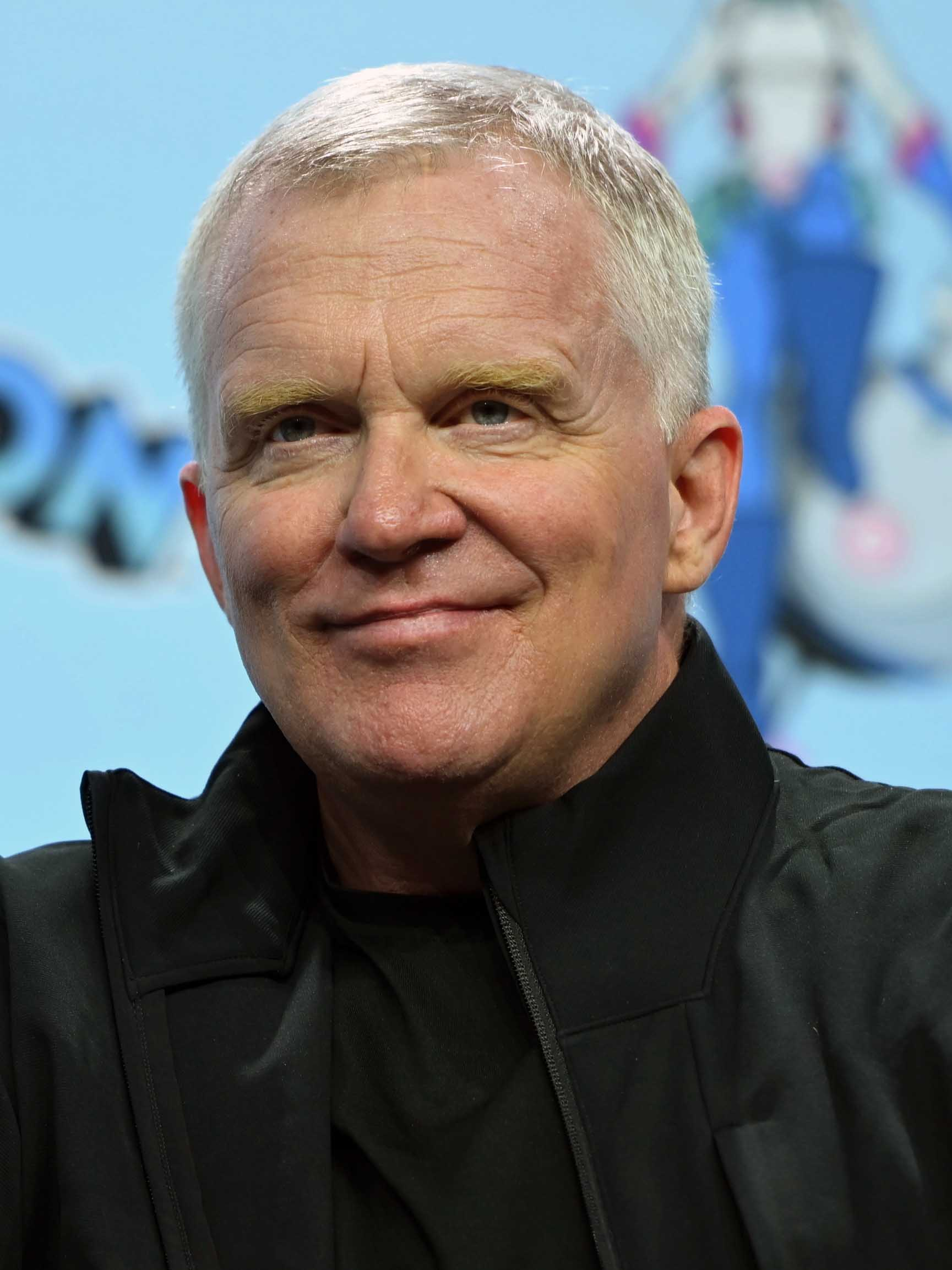
- Hall in 2024
- Born: Michael Anthony Thomas Charles Hall; April 14, 1968 (age 58); Boston, Massachusetts, U.S.
- Occupation: Actor
- Years active: 1977–present
- Spouse: Lucia Oskerova (m. 2020)
- Children: 1
- Website: manhattan.film

Anthony Michael Hall (born Michael Anthony Thomas Charles Hall; April 14, 1968) is an American actor. Following his film debut in Six Pack (1982) and a supporting role as Russell "Rusty" Griswold in National Lampoon's Vacation (1983), Hall had his breakout with starring roles in three John Hughes-directed films: Sixteen Candles, The Breakfast Club, and Weird Science. Mainstream media associated Hall with a group of young actors known as the "Brat Pack" due to his roles in those films.

Hall diversified his roles to avoid becoming typecast as his geek persona, joining the cast of Saturday Night Live (1985–1986) and starring in films such as Out of Bounds (1986), Johnny Be Good (1988), and Edward Scissorhands (1990). Following multiple minor roles in the 1990s, he starred as Microsoft co-founder Bill Gates in the television film Pirates of Silicon Valley (1999).

Hall experienced a career resurgence with the lead role in the USA Network science fiction series The Dead Zone (2002–2007) and a supporting role in the superhero film The Dark Knight (2008). In the 2010s and 2020s, Hall starred in the films Results (2015), War Machine (2017), Bodied (2017), Halloween Kills (2021), and Trigger Warning (2024). He also had a main role on the third season of the Amazon Prime Video series Reacher (2025).

== Early life ==
Michael Anthony Thomas Charles Hall was born on April 14, 1968, in the West Roxbury neighborhood of Boston. He is the only child of blues-jazz singer Mercedes Hall's first marriage. She divorced Hall's father, Larry, an auto-body-shop owner, when their son was six months old. When Hall was three, he and his mother relocated to the West Coast, where she found work as a featured singer. After a year and a half, they returned east, eventually moving to New York City, where Hall grew up.

Hall's ancestry is English, Irish and Italian. He has a half-sister, Mary Chestaro, from his mother's second marriage to Thomas Chestaro, a show business manager. His half-sister is a singer performing under the name Mary C. He transposed his first and middle names when he entered show business because there was another actor named Michael Hall who was already a member of the Screen Actors Guild.

Hall attended St. Hilda's & St. Hugh's School of New York before moving on to Manhattan's Professional Children's School. Hall began his acting career at age eight and continued throughout high school. "I did not go to college," he has said, "but I'm an avid reader in the ongoing process of educating myself." Through the 1980s, Hall's mother managed his career, eventually relinquishing that role to her second husband.

== Career ==
=== Early years ===
At the age of seven, Hall started his career in commercials. He was the Honeycomb cereal kid and appeared in several commercials for toys and Bounty. His stage debut was in 1977, when he was cast as the young Steve Allen in Allen's semi-autobiographical play The Wake. He went on to appear in the Lincoln Center Festival's production of St. Joan of the Microphone, and in a play with Woody Allen. In 1980, he made his screen debut in the Emmy-winning TV movie The Gold Bug, in which he played the young Edgar Allan Poe. In 1981, he starred as Huck Finn in Rascals and Robbers: The Secret Adventures of Tom Sawyer and Huckleberry Finn opposite Patrick Creadon, but it was not until the release of the 1982 Kenny Rogers film Six Pack that he gained real notice.

=== John Hughes: 1983–1986 ===
The following year, Hall was chosen for the role of Rusty Griswold, Chevy Chase and Beverly D'Angelo's son, in National Lampoon's Vacation, catching the attention of the film's screenwriter John Hughes, who was about to begin directing. "For [Hall] to upstage Chevy, I thought, was a remarkable accomplishment for a 13-year-old kid," said Hughes. The film was a significant box office hit in 1983, grossing over $61 million in the United States. After Vacation, Hall moved on to other projects and declined to reprise his role in the 1985 sequel.

Hall's breakout role came in 1984, when he was cast as "The Geek", the scrawny, braces-wearing geek who pursued Molly Ringwald's character in John Hughes's directing debut Sixteen Candles. Hall tried to avoid the clichés of geekiness. "I didn't play him with 100 pens sticking out of his pocket," he said. "I just went in there and played it like a real kid. The geek is just a typical freshman." Hall landed a spot on the promotional materials along with co-star Ringwald. Reviews of the film were positive for Hall and his co-stars, and a review in People even claimed that Hall's performance "pilfer[ed] the film" from Ringwald. Despite achieving only moderate success at the box office, the film made overnight stars of Ringwald and Hall.

In 1985, Hall starred in two additional teen-oriented films written and directed by Hughes. He was cast as Brian Johnson, "the brain", in The Breakfast Club, co-starring Emilio Estevez, Judd Nelson, Ally Sheedy, and Molly Ringwald. Film critic Janet Maslin praised Hall, stating that the 16-year-old actor and Ringwald were "the movie's standout performers". Hall and fellow co-star Molly Ringwald dated for a short period after filming The Breakfast Club. Later that year, Hall portrayed Gary Wallace, another likable misfit, in Weird Science. Critic Sheila Benson from the Los Angeles Times said Hall was "the role model supreme" for the character, but she also acknowledged that "he [was] outgrowing the role" and "[didn't] need to hold the patent on the bratty bright kid". Weird Science was a moderate success at the box office but was generally well received by critics. Those roles established him as the 1980s' "nerd-of-choice", as well as a member of Hollywood's Brat Pack. Hall, who portrayed Hughes's alter egos in Sixteen Candles, The Breakfast Club and Weird Science, credited the director for putting him on the map and giving him those opportunities as a child. "I had the time of my life," he said. "I'd consider [working with Hughes again] any day of the week."

To avoid being typecast, Hall turned down roles written for him by John Hughes in Ferris Bueller's Day Off (Cameron Frye) and Pretty in Pink (Phil "Duckie" Dale), both in 1986. Instead, he starred in the 1986 film Out of Bounds, Hall's first excursion into the thriller and action genre. The film grossed only $5 million domestically and was a critical and financial disappointment. Critic Roger Ebert described Out of Bounds as "an explosion at the cliché factory", and Caryn James from The New York Times claimed that not even "Hall, who made nerds seem lovable in John Hughes' Sixteen Candles and The Breakfast Club, [couldn't] do much to reconcile" the disparate themes of the movie.

=== SNL: 1985 ===
Hall joined the cast of Saturday Night Live (SNL) during its 1985–86 season at the age of 17. He was, and remains, the youngest cast member in the show's history. Art Garfunkel, Edd Byrnes, Robert F. Kennedy, and Daryl Hall were among Hall's celebrity impersonations. Hall had admired the show and its stars as a child, but he found the SNL environment to be far more competitive than he had imagined. "My year there, I didn't have any breakout characters and I didn't really do the things I dreamed I would do," he said, "but I still learned a lot and I value that. I'll always be proud of the fact that I was a part of its history." Hall was one of six cast members (the others being Joan Cusack, Robert Downey Jr., Randy Quaid, Terry Sweeney and Danitra Vance) who were dismissed at the end of that season.

=== Post-Hughes ===
Hall was offered the starring role in the 1987 film Full Metal Jacket in a conversation with Stanley Kubrick, but after an eight-month negotiation, a financial agreement could not be reached. "It was a difficult decision, because in that eight-month period, I read everything I could about the guy, and I was really fascinated by him," Hall said when asked about the film. "I wanted to be a part of that film, but it didn't work out. But all sorts of stories circulated, like I got on set and I was fired, or I was pissed at him for shooting too long. It's all not true." He was replaced with Matthew Modine. His next film was 1988's Johnny Be Good, in which he worked with Uma Thurman and fellow Saturday Night Live cast member Robert Downey Jr. The film was a critical failure, and some reviewers panned Hall's performance as a high school football star, stating that he, the movies' reigning geek, was miscast in the role. A review for The Washington Post claimed that the film was "crass, vulgar, and relentlessly brain-dead".

Hall was considered for the role of Nuke Laloosh in Bull Durham. He was the top choice of Orion Pictures executives, but the actor irritated writer-director Ron Shelton by showing up unprepared for interviews. "I thought Ron was going to shoot him," said producer Mark Burg.

=== 1990s ===
After a two-year break due to a reported drinking problem, Hall returned to acting by starring opposite Johnny Depp and Winona Ryder in Tim Burton's 1990 hit Edward Scissorhands, this time as the film's villain. By then in his 20s, he shifted to more mature roles, trying to establish himself as an adult actor. After Scissorhands, he appeared in a series of low-budget films, including the 1990 film A Gnome Named Gnorm, where he starred as a detective who was forced to team up with a strange looking Gnome, making for a buddy cop movie with mixed reviews. He also was in the 1992 comedy Into the Sun, where he starred as a visiting celebrity at a military air base. Film critic Janet Maslin praised his performance, writing that "Hall, whose earlier performances (in films like National Lampoon's Vacation and Sixteen Candles) have been much goofier, remains coolly funny and graduates to subtler forms of comedy with this role." The following year, he played a gay man who teaches down-and-out Will Smith to dupe rich people in the critically acclaimed film Six Degrees of Separation; Hall claimed that it was "the hardest role [he] ever had".

In 1994, Hall starred in and directed his first feature film, a low-budget Showtime comedy titled Hail Caesar about a would-be rock star who works in a pencil eraser factory. The film also co-starred Samuel L. Jackson, Robert Downey Jr., and Judd Nelson. In addition, he produced the soundtrack for the film with composer Herbie Tribino. The film featured songs written and performed by Hall.

=== Music ===
Following his family tradition, Hall pursued his other passion of music. He was the lead singer and songwriter for his band, Hall of Mirrors, formed in 1998. The band released an album, Welcome to the Hall of Mirrors, through Hall's own RAM Records label in 1999, with collaborations from former Guns N' Roses guitarist Gilby Clarke and Prince's former keyboard player Tommy Barbarella. It featured songs from his self-directed film Hail Caesar (1994).

=== Pirates of Silicon Valley ===
After a series of appearances in low-budget films and guest roles on TV series in the mid and late 1990s, he gained media attention once again in the 1999 Emmy-nominated TNT original movie Pirates of Silicon Valley, co-starring Noah Wyle as Apple Computer's Steve Jobs. Hall was widely praised for his portrayal of Microsoft billionaire Bill Gates. "I really fought for this part because I knew it would be the role of a lifetime," Hall said. "It was a thrill and a daunting challenge to play someone of his stature and brilliance." In an interview with the San Francisco Chronicle, Hall described the physical appearance and mannersisms he adopted to portray 20-year-old Gates:

"'First, you have to lose the neck.' The top six inches of his spine seem to disappear. 'You go down, down. You lose the body; you get softer shoulders, you slump, you create a little gut.' He is almost there. 'Then you extend the neck and you do a little duck walk.' He walks across the room. Add ill-fitting clothes, mop-top hair, a pair of oversize glasses and a cold stare, and the impersonation is complete.

=== 2000s ===
After making a cameo appearance as himself in the 2000 comedy film Happy Accidents, Hall appeared in several made-for-TV films. He starred opposite Sheryl Lee as a cheating husband in the 2001 USA Network cable movie Hitched. In the same year, he played renowned music producer Robert "Mutt" Lange in VH1's movie Hysteria: The Def Leppard Story and starred as legendary lefty baseball pitcher Whitey Ford in Billy Crystal's highly acclaimed HBO film, 61*.

On the big screen, Hall took on supporting roles in the mystery-drama The Caveman's Valentine (2001) opposite Samuel L. Jackson, the critically panned Freddy Got Fingered (2001) opposite Tom Green, and the action-comedy All About the Benjamins (2002) opposite Ice Cube.

=== The Dead Zone: 2002–2007 ===
Hall began his first regular series role in 2002, starring as Johnny Smith in USA Network's supernatural drama The Dead Zone, a TV series adapted from Stephen King's best-selling novel. He was cast in the show after executive producer Michael Piller saw his performance in Pirates of Silicon Valley. The show debuted on June 16, 2002, and drew higher ratings for a premiere than any other cable series in television history with 6.4 million viewers. The Dead Zone quickly developed a loyal audience, with the show and Hall receiving strong reviews. The Pittsburgh Tribune-Review wrote that "Hall's Johnny flashes the qualities - comic timing, great facial expressions - that made him a star in the 1980s movies Sixteen Candles and The Breakfast Club." The Dead Zone, Hall said, "has transformed my career." The show proved to be one of USA Network's top shows and one of the highest-rated programs on basic cable.

The Dead Zone opening credits list Hall as co-producer (seasons 1–3), producer (seasons 5) and co-executive producer (season 6). Hall also directed an episode from season three, "The Cold Hard Truth," guest starring standup comic Richard Lewis. "['The Cold Hard Truth'], I feel, is my best work as a director, because I had this great crew that knows me well and has been working with me," said Hall. "I also had the best script that I've had an opportunity to direct." The show's sixth and final season premiered on June 17, 2007. USA Network officially canceled The Dead Zone in December 2007.

=== Late 2000s ===
Hall appeared in the tenth episode of Criss Angel Mindfreak's fourth season.

In 2008, Hall appeared as Gotham City television reporter/anchor Mike Engel in The Dark Knight.

Hall develops film and television projects under his production company banner AMH Entertainment. Hall starred in Aftermath, a 2010 independent crime-drama film, with Tony Danza and Frank Whaley.

=== 2010s ===
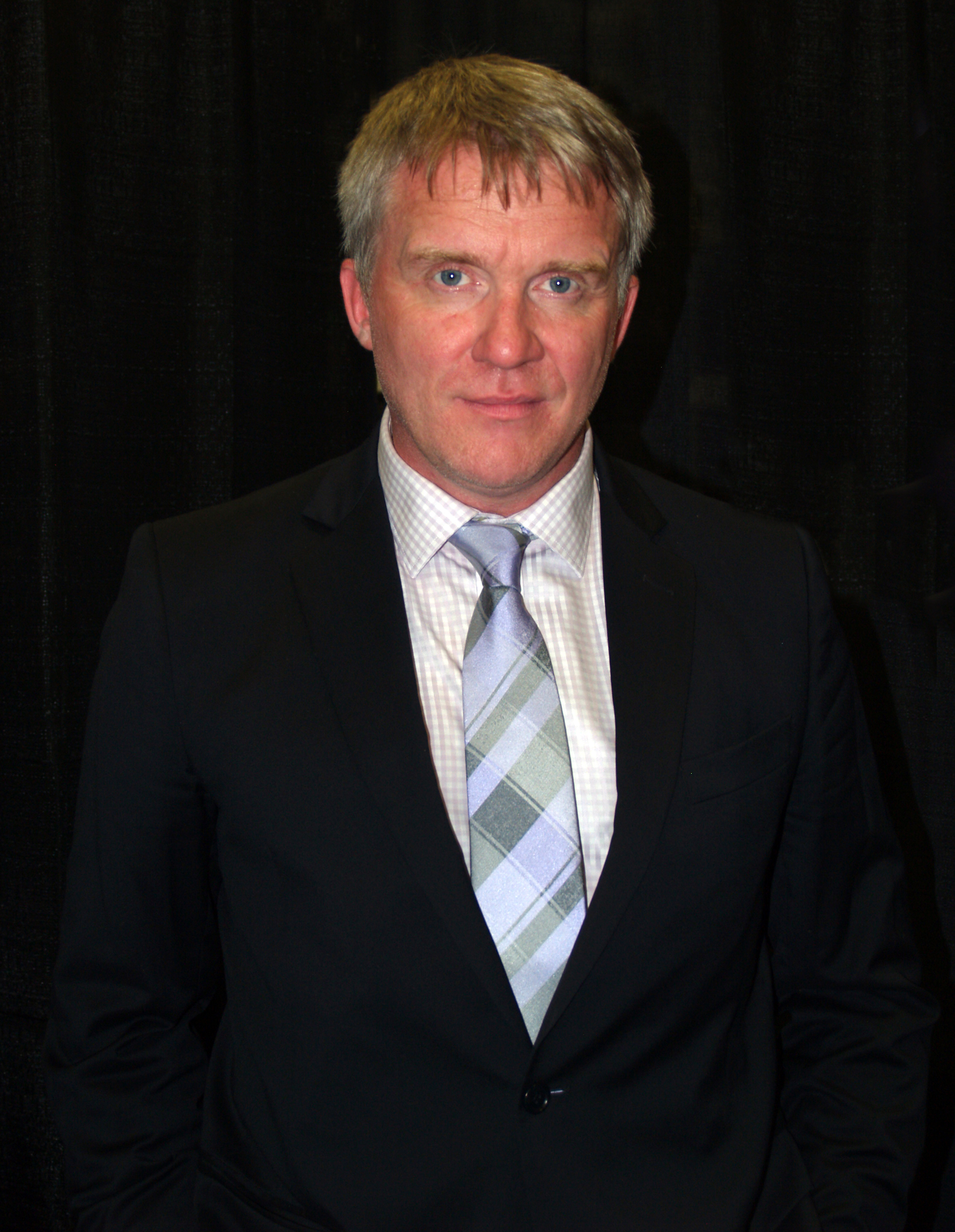
Hall in 2013

Hall made guest appearances in two episodes of the sitcom Community.

In 2011, he played the main antagonist in Season 3 of Warehouse 13. He played Walter Sykes, a man who once benefited from the use of an artifact but harboured a deep-seated anger towards the Warehouse and its agents when the artifact was taken from him (episodes 3.09, 3.11, 3.12). He also appeared in an episode of Z Nation in the role of Gideon, a former communications manager leading a group of zombie apocalypse survivors.

In 2013, Hall appeared on Psych as Harris Trout, an efficiency expert temporarily appointed to oversee the Santa Barbara Police Department. His role continued the show’s tradition of featuring guest appearances by 1980s pop culture icons, reflecting Psych’s frequent nods to the decade’s television and film culture.

Hall reprised his role as Rusty Griswold from National Lampoon's Vacation, in a series of Old Navy 2012 holiday commercials featuring the Griswold family. In 2015, Hall was cast in the 2017 Netflix film War Machine alongside Brad Pitt. Hall played General Greg Pulver, a character based on U.S. General Michael Flynn, who became a controversial public figure around the time of the film's release. At the end of production, Pitt presented his co-stars with engraved wristwatches as a memento for their time making the film. Hall: "It was just such a privilege to work with him [Pitt]."

In 2016, Hall played himself as a customer in an AT&T Mobile commercial. The same year, Hall was cast in a recurring role on the TNT drama series Murder in the First.

In 2019, Hall began appearing on the ABC sitcom The Goldbergs, when he played Rusty in the season 7 premiere, "Vacation", which paid homage to and poked fun at his character from the 1983 film. He had a recurring role on the show as guidance counselor Mr. Perott for the remainder of the series.

=== 2020s ===
Hall was cast as Tommy Doyle in the 2021 Halloween sequel, Halloween Kills. While he expressed interest in returning for 2022's Halloween Ends, this did not come to pass.

In 2023, Hall appeared in the Amazon Prime Video series Bosch: Legacy for 5 episodes, a follow-up to the critical acclaimed series Bosch (2014–2021).

Hall appeared in the third season of Lee Child's hit series Reacher in the role of Zachary Beck.

As of June 2024, Hall was said to be developing a new series with Robert Downey Jr. called Singularity.

In 2025 Hall played a guest starring role as Ron Kruger, leader of the Phoenix Cadets, in Wednesday Episode 2.3, "Call of the Woe".

In 2026, Hall played Zachary Beck, one the main criminal antagonists in Season 3 of the Amazon Prime series Reacher.

== In the media ==
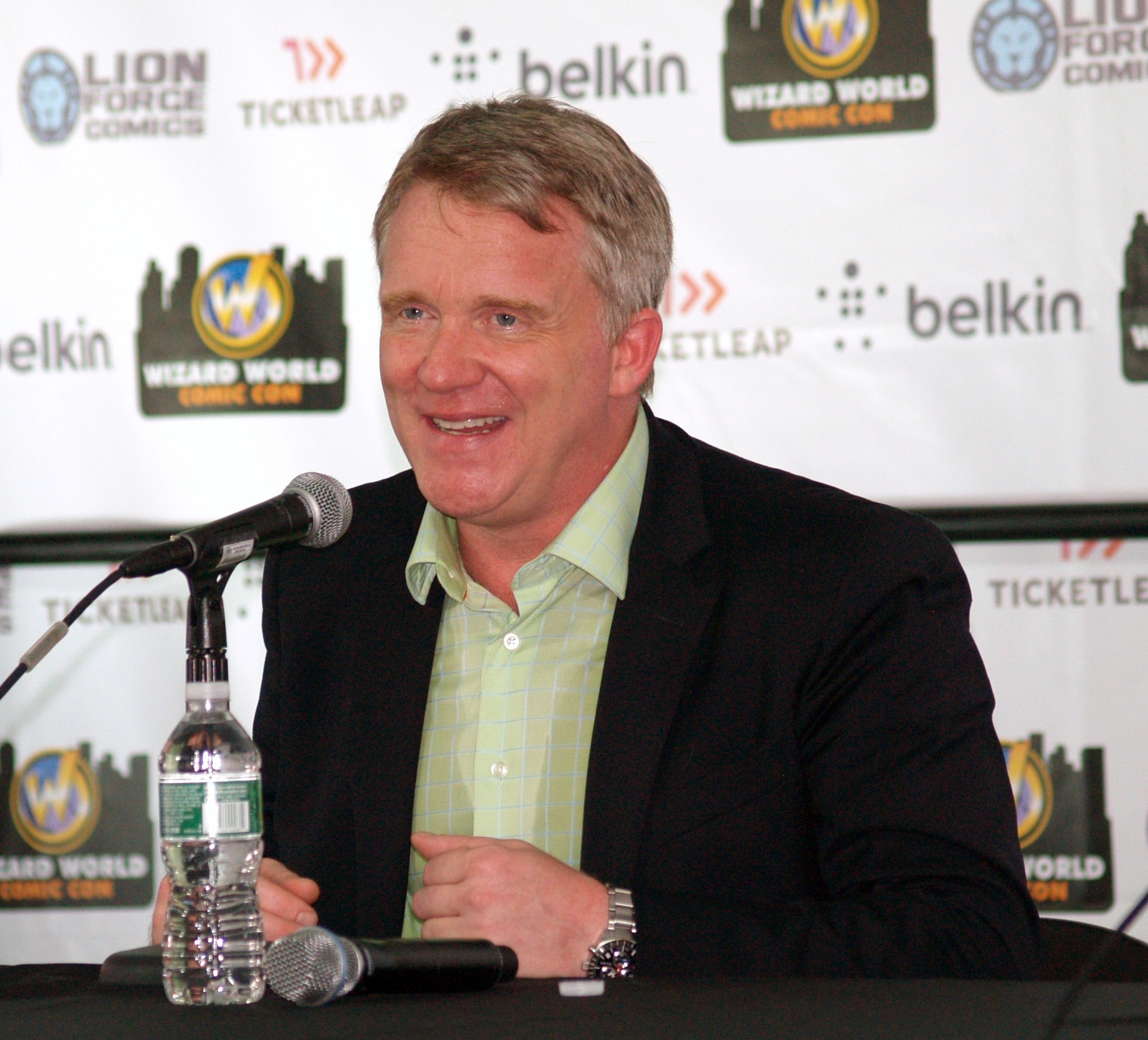
Hall during a Q&A session at the 2013 Wizard World New York Experience

Hall became a regular subject of tabloid media after New York magazine named him a member of the "Brat Pack", the group of young actors who became famous in the 1980s and frequently starred together. In the late 1980s, Hall's drinking problem, which began in his early teens, made headlines. Hall eventually quit drinking and became fully sober by 1990. "The truth is, I had my partying nights, but I never really bounced at the bottom," he said. "I never went to rehab...I was able to govern myself and continue my work."

In 1990, Hall's physical appearance in Edward Scissorhands surprised audiences. His more muscular appearance and intimidating physical demeanor provoked rumors of steroid use, but Hall later said that "the weight gain was natural."

Hall's role in the 1993 film Six Degrees of Separation made news not because of what occurred onscreen, but rather what failed to occur. Hall played a gay love interest to Will Smith, who had previously agreed to a kissing scene between the two. However, on the day of the shoot, Smith refused to film the scene. Smith told the press that he called Denzel Washington for advice, who told him that an onscreen same-sex kiss was a bad career move. When asked about the incident during an interview, Hall said, "I didn't care. I wasn't that comfortable with it, either, and ultimately, we used a camera trick."

=== Disturbance ===
On November 17, 2016, the Los Angeles District Attorney charged Hall with felony assault with serious bodily injury following a September 13 confrontation with a neighbor at Hall's Playa del Rey condominium complex. In September 2017, Hall pleaded no contest to a lesser charge, was found guilty, and sentenced to three year's probation and 40 hours of community service. He was subsequently sued by the victim. In August 2020, Hall caught the media's attention after an argument with hotel guests at a pool in Austin, Texas. Hall apologized immediately afterwards.

== Recognition ==
The 2001 film Not Another Teen Movie pays tribute to Hall's numerous appearances in the teen-oriented, 1980s comedy films parodied by the movie. A brief shot of the sign over the door of a high school cafeteria reveals that the facility is named the Anthony Michael Dining Hall. In 2006, Hall was ranked #4 in VH1's list of the "100 Greatest Teen Stars" and number 41 in "100 Greatest Kid Stars".

In June 2005, The Breakfast Club was rewarded with the Silver Bucket of Excellence Award at the MTV Movie Awards, in honor of the film's twentieth anniversary. For the show, MTV attempted to reunite the original cast. Ally Sheedy, Molly Ringwald, and Hall appeared together on stage, and Paul Gleason gave the award to his former castmates. Emilio Estevez could not attend due to family commitments, while Judd Nelson appeared earlier on the red carpet, but while moving to seats closer to the stage, got separated from the group. Hall quipped that the two were "in Africa with Dave Chappelle."

== Personal life ==
Michael dated Internet personality Trisha Paytas in what she described as a toxic and abusive relationship from 2008-2013.

As of 2016, Hall lived in the Playa del Rey neighborhood of Los Angeles. He is godfather to Robert Downey Jr.'s son, Indio Falconer Downey.

In 2019, Hall became engaged to Slovak-Canadian actress Lucia Oskerova. In February 2023, they announced that they were expecting their first child. Their son was born in June 2023.

Hall assists at-risk youth through his literacy program, The Anthony Michael Hall Literacy Club, in association with Chapman University.

=== Health ===
Hall had spoken openly about his struggles with substance abuse, bipolar disorder and depression.

=== Politics ===
Hall, during a 2020 interview on YouTube, described Republican President Donald Trump as "great" and further stated "I think what he's done for the country is incredible". Hall also suggested that conservative actors get blacklisted in Hollywood and said he had personally witnessed it in practice. However, in a 2024 interview with The Guardian, when asked if he still supported Trump, Hall declined to discuss politics, and described himself as "apolitical."

== Filmography ==
=== Film ===
Year	Title	Role	Notes
1982	Six Pack	"Doc"	
1983	National Lampoon's Vacation	Russell "Rusty" Griswold	
1984	Sixteen Candles	Ted "Farmer Ted" Farmer / The Geek	
1985	The Breakfast Club	Brian R. Johnson	
1985	Weird Science	Gary Wallace	
1986	Out of Bounds	Daryl Cage	
1988	Johnny Be Good	Johnny Walker	
1990	Edward Scissorhands	Jim	
1990	A Gnome Named Gnorm	Detective Casey Gallagher	
1990	Whatever Happened to Mason Reese	Mason Reese	Voice; short film
1992	Into the Sun	Tom Slade	
1993	Six Degrees of Separation	Trent Conway	
1994	Hail Caesar	Julius Caesar McMurty	Also director
1994	Who Do I Gotta Kill?	Jimmy's Friend Kevin Friedland	
1995	Ripple	Marshall Gray	
1996	Exit in Red	Nick	
1996	The Grave	Travis	
1997	Trojan War	Bus Driver	
1997	Cold Night Into Dawn	Eddie Rodgers	
1999	2 Little, 2 Late	Mr. Burggins	
1999	Revenge	Brian Cutler	
1999	Dirt Merchant	Jeffry Alan Spacy	
2000	Happy Accidents	Himself	Cameo
2000	The Photographer	Greg	
2001	The Caveman's Valentine	Bob	
2001	Freddy Got Fingered	Mr. Dave Davidson	
2001	Hysteria - The Def Leppard Story	Robert "Mutt" Lange	
2002	All About the Benjamins	"Lil J"	
2005	Funny Valentine	Josh	Also co-producer
2007	LA Blues	Larry	
2008	The Dark Knight	Mike Engel	
2011	Last Man Standing	Nick Collins	
2013	Aftermath	Tom Fiorini	Also producer
2013	Dead in Tombstone	Red "Rojo" Cavanaugh	
2014	Foxcatcher	Jack	
2015	Results	Grigory	
2016	Natural Selection	Mr. Ray Stevenson	
2016	Live by Night	Gary L. Smith	
2017	The Lears	Glenn Lear	
2017	War Machine	General Hank Pulver	
2017	Bodied	Professor Merkin	
2021	Halloween Kills	Tommy Doyle	
2022	The Class	Mr. Faulk	Also executive producer
2022	Clerks III	Auditioner	Cameo
2023	Roswell Delirium	Jerry Baskin	Also a producer
2024	Trigger Warning	Ezekiel Swann	
2024	Air Force One Down	Sam Waltman	

=== Television ===
Year	Title	Role	Notes
1980	The Gold Bug	Young Edgar Allan Poe	TV film
1981	Jennifer's Journey	Michael	TV series
1982	Rascals and Robbers: The Secret Adventures of Tom Sawyer and Huck Finn	Huckleberry "Huck" Finn	TV film
1985–1986	Saturday Night Live	Various	12 episodes
1993	Tales from the Crypt	Reggie Skulnick	Episode: "Creep Course"
1994	James A. Michener's Texas	Yancey Quimper	TV film
1995	NYPD Blue	Hanson Riker	Episode: "Travels with Andy"
1995	Deadly Games	Chuck Manley/The Camp Counselor	Episode:" The Camp Counselor" Pt. 1 and 2
1995	A Bucket of Blood	Walter Paisley	TV film
1996	Murder, She Wrote	Les Franklin	Episode: "What You Don't Know Can Kill You"
1996	Touched by an Angel	Thomas Prescott	Episode: "Flesh and Blood"
1996	Hijacked: Flight 285	Peter Cronin	TV film
1997	The Jamie Foxx Show	Tim	Episode: "Do the Right Thing"
1997	Diagnosis: Murder	Dr. Johnson	Episode: "Looks Can Kill"
1998	Poltergeist: The Legacy	John Griffin	Episode: "Debt of Honor"
1999	Touched by an Angel	Thomas Prescott	Episode: "Full Circle"
1999	The Crow: Stairway to Heaven	Officer Reid Truax	Episode: "Dead to Rights"
1999	Pirates of Silicon Valley	Bill Gates	TV film
1999	A Touch of Hope	Dean Kraft	TV film
2001	Hitched	Ted Robbins	TV film
2001	61*	Whitey Ford	TV film
2002–2007	The Dead Zone	Johnny Smith	Lead role; 81 episodes, also producer
2007	Entourage	Himself	Episode: "The First Cut Is the Deepest"
2007	Final Approach	Greg Gilliad	TV film
2008	Gotham Tonight	Mike Engel	4 episodes
2009, 2011	Community	Mike Chilada	2 episodes
2010	CSI: Miami	Dr. James Bradstone	Episode: "In the Wind"
2011	No Ordinary Family	Roy Minor	Episode: "No Ordinary Proposal"
2011	Warehouse 13	Walter Sykes	5 episodes
2011	American Dad!	Tom	Episode: "Stanny Boy and Frantastic"
2013	Awkward	Mr. Hart	10 episodes (season 3)
2013	Psych	Harris Trout	3 episodes
2013	Zombie Night	Patrick Jackson	TV film
2015	Z Nation	Gideon Gould	Episode: "Corporate Retreat"
2015	Rosewood	Detective Willet	Episode: "Pilot"
2016	Murder in the First	Paul Barnes	5 episodes (season 3)
2018	Riverdale	Principal Featherhead	Episode: "Chapter Thirty-Nine: The Midnight Club"
2019	American Dad!	(voice)	Episode: "Twinanigans"
2019	Agents of S.H.I.E.L.D.	Mr. Kitson	Episode: "Toldja"
2019–2023	The Goldbergs	Rusty Perott, security guard	9 episodes (seasons 6–10)
2020	The Blacklist	Robby Ressler	2 episodes (season 7)
2023	Bosch: Legacy	Agent William Baron	Recurring role; 5 episodes (season 2)
2025	Reacher	Zachary Beck	Main role, Season 3
2025	Wednesday	Ron Kruger	Episode: "Call of the Woe"
2026	Nation's Dumbest	self	Reality show, 9 episodes

== Bibliography ==
- Holmstrom, John. The Moving Picture Boy: An International Encyclopaedia from 1895 to 1995. Norwich, Michael Russell, 1996, p. 372.
