= Michel Roger Lafosse =

Claimant to the Scottish throne

Michel Roger Lafosse (born 21 April 1958 in Watermael-Boitsfort, Brussels, Belgium), subsequently known as Michael James Alexander Stewart of Albany, claims to be a descendant of Charles Edward Stuart ("Bonnie Prince Charlie") and to be the legitimate Jacobite claimant to the throne of the Kingdom of Scotland.

Since 1979 he has referred to himself as "HRH Prince Michael James Alexander Stewart, 7th Count of Albany", stating that an ancestor used the title "Count of Albany". Lafosse also says he has the right to other noble titles including Comte de Blois, Duc d'Aquitaine and Baron Lafosse de Chatry.

== The House of Stuart and Lafosse's claims ==
The Royal House of Stuart became extinct in the male line with the death in 1807 of Henry Benedict Stuart, called "King Henry IX" by Jacobites, who succeeded his elder brother Charles Edward Stuart in 1788. Charles was survived only by an illegitimate daughter, Charlotte Stuart, Duchess of Albany, and her own illegitimate son Charles Edward Stuart, Count Roehenstart and daughters. The Jacobite claim to the British throne then passed to members of various continental Catholic dynasties, most recently to Franz, Duke of Bavaria, head of the Wittelsbach dynasty.

Lafosse claims that this history is inaccurate and that the Stuart line did not end with the death of Henry Benedict Stuart. Instead, Lafosse says that Charles Edward Stuart secretly obtained a papal annulment of his marriage to Princess Louise of Stolberg-Gedern and, subsequently, in a secret ceremony, married a woman called Marguerite O'Dea d'Audibert de Lussan, Comtesse de Massillan. He says this union produced an heir in 1786, a son, Edward James Stuart, Count Stuarton, Count of Albany, from whom he says he is descended.

Lafosse says he is the son of "HRH Princess Renee Stewart, Lady Derneley" (according to Lafosse, the senior descendant in the female line of Edward James Stuart), and "Gustave Lafosse de Chatry, 5th Baron de Chatry". These individuals, as well as others, are listed in an extensive genealogy presented by Lafosse as evidence that he is descended from the last Stuart King of Scotland.

There is some disagreement over who Lafosse's parents and ancestors were. Lafosse says he was born on 21 April 1958 in the Ville de Bruxelles district, and that his parents were Baron Gustave Joseph Fernand Clément Lafosse and Princess Renée Julienne Stewart. In 2002, Brussels authorities stated that this certificate is a forgery, and that they have a birth certificate showing that Lafosse was born in Brussels on 21 April 1958, in the Watermael-Boitsfort district to Gustave Joseph Clément Fernand Lafosse, a shopkeeper, and Renée Julienne Dée, a business employee.

Peter Piniski, in The Stuarts' Last Secret, says of Lafosse's assertion:

One recent, heroically unsubstantiated claim is that Prince Charles married in 1785 and fathered a legitimate child. This 'fact' (which has escaped the notice of every historian for over two hundred years!), is particularly imaginative considering the prince was married at the time, being only separated from Louise von Stolberg-Gedern, after April 3rd 1784, who remained under the protection of the Pope. Nor was eighteenth century Rome the best of cities for an internationally known Roman Catholic prince to commit bigamy. It also ignores Charles' wretchedly infirm condition from before that date until his death three years later. Likewise does it ignore the presence (and insult the memory) of Charles' daughter and sole heir, Charlotte, who was daily at her father's side, nursing him right up to the moment of his death despite her own cancer. Professing direct descent on the female line from this 'marriage' the same claimant equally fails to provide any evidence, proper references or verifiable source documents for his additional assertion of descent on the male line from not one, but both daughters of Charlotte Stuart. Professor Lenman describes all of this as: 'The industry of Stuart charlatanism'.

Lafosse has also stated that he was "President of the European Council of Princes", following Archduke Otto of Austria's tenure in that position. Archduke Otto later said that he had never been president of any such body, or a member of any such body, and that, in fact, he had never heard of it.

== The Forgotten Monarchy of Scotland ==
Written by Lafosse, The Forgotten Monarchy of Scotland: The True Story of the Royal House of Stewart and the Hidden Lineage of the Kings and Queens of Scots is a book published in Shaftesbury, England, in 1998. The book claims to provide previously unknown accounts of the life of Charles Edward Stuart, the last head of the Royal House of Stuart, during his exile from Britain.

Lafosse, who claims descent from Charles, includes within the book various accounts of previously unknown marriages and births within the Royal House of Stuart, beginning with the secret annulment of the marriage of Charles Edward Stuart and Princess Louise of Stolberg-Gedern, and his subsequent remarriage to Marguerite O'Dea d'Audibert de Lussan, Comtesse de Massillan.

== Present activities ==
Although born in Belgium as Michel Roger Lafosse, he became a naturalized British citizen in the 1990s and has since used the name Michael James Alexander Stewart of Albany. His website stated that he was a diplomat of the self-styled Federation of Autonomous Priories of the Sovereign Order of Saint John of Jerusalem, Knights of Malta (not the Sovereign Military Order of Malta or one of the Protestant Alliance Orders), and a cultural attaché at the Knights of Malta's embassy in the Democratic Republic of São Tomé and Príncipe in West Africa; and that he has been awarded the United Nations 2001 "Volunteer Service Medal" under the name "Albany".

Lafosse claimed to be the Fons Honorum and Grand Protector of The Imperial and Royal Dragon Court and Order in Britain and the English-speaking world.

On 18 June 2006 the Sunday Mail reported that Lafosse was to be deported after having lost British citizenship because, it is alleged, he submitted a forged birth certificate. Later, on 23 July 2006, the Sunday Mail reported that, in the wake of the publicity surrounding his claims and his loss of British citizenship, Lafosse had sold his house in Edinburgh and returned to Belgium to live with his mother.

His latest book, co-authored with Walid Amine Salhab, is The Knights Templar of the Middle East: The Hidden History of the Islamic Origins of Freemasonry (2006).

== See also ==
- Anthony William Hall, who claimed descent from King Henry VIII and Anne Boleyn (from an illegitimate son born before their marriage).
