= Kristin Davis =

American actress (born 1965)

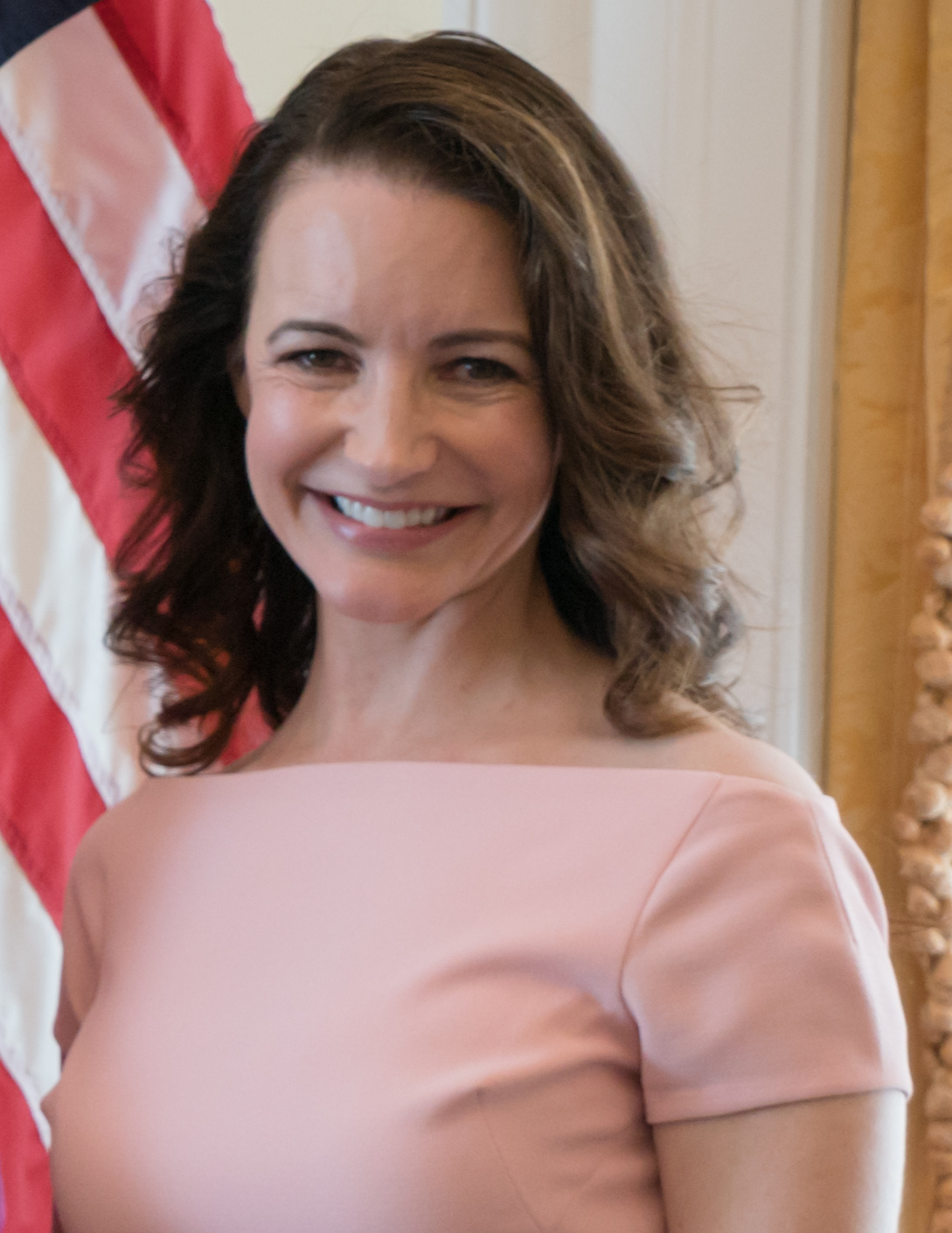
- Davis in 2018
- Born: Kristin Landen Davis; February 23, 1965 (age 61); Boulder, Colorado, U.S.
- Education: Rutgers University–New Brunswick (BFA)
- Occupations: Actress; producer
- Years active: 1988–present
- Children: 2

Kristin Landen Davis (also listed as Kristin Lee Davis; born February 23, 1965) is an American actress and producer. She is known for playing Charlotte York in the HBO romantic comedy series Sex and the City (1998–2004). She received nominations at the Emmys and the Golden Globes in 2004 for her role as Charlotte, and reprised the role in the films Sex and the City (2008) and Sex and the City 2 (2010), as well as the revival of the show And Just Like That... (2021–2025) on HBO Max.

Davis's big break came in 1995, when she was cast as the villainous Brooke Armstrong in the Fox prime time soap opera Melrose Place (1995–1996). Her film credits include The Shaggy Dog (2006), Deck the Halls (2006), Couples Retreat (2009), Journey 2: The Mysterious Island (2012) and Holiday in the Wild (2019). Davis made her Broadway debut playing Mabel Cantwell in the 2012 revival of The Best Man, and her West End debut playing Beth Gallagher in the original 2014 stage production of Fatal Attraction.

== Early life and education ==
Davis was born on February 23, 1965, in Boulder, Colorado. She is an only child, and her parents divorced when she was a baby. She was adopted by her stepfather, then-University of Colorado Boulder professor Keith Davis, after he married her mother, Dorothy, a university data analyst, in 1968. She has three stepsisters from her father's first marriage. Early in her childhood, she and her parents moved to Columbia, South Carolina, where her father served as provost and taught psychology at the University of South Carolina.

Davis wanted to be an actress from the age of nine, when she was cast in the Workshop Theatre production of Snow White and the Seven Dwarfs. Davis lived in South Carolina until she graduated from A.C. Flora High School in 1983. She then moved to New Jersey, where she attended Rutgers University. Davis graduated with a BFA degree in acting from Rutgers University's Mason Gross School of the Arts in 1987.

== Career ==
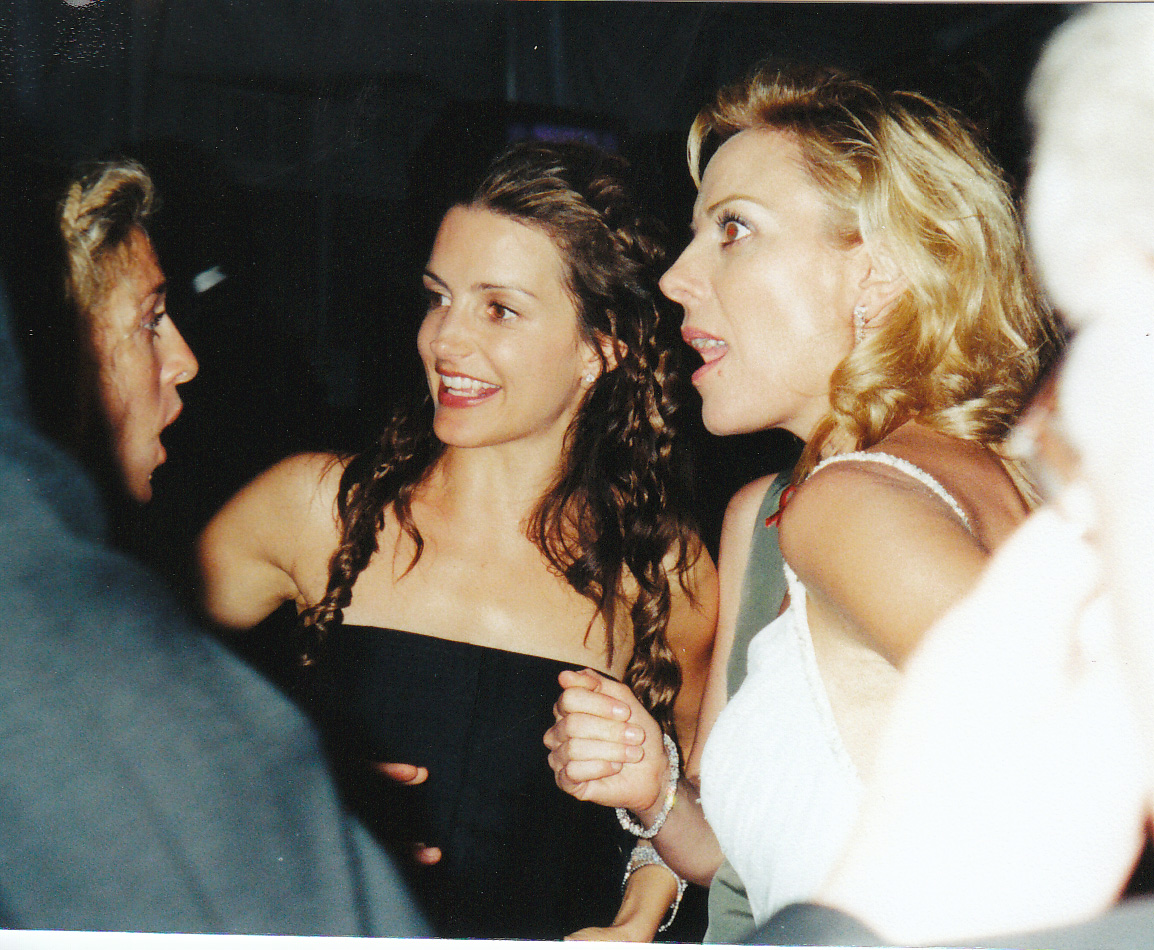
Davis and Kim Cattrall at the HBO party after the 1999 Emmy Awards

=== Television ===
After graduation in 1987, Davis moved to New York and waited tables before opening a yoga studio with a friend. In 1991, she acted in a couple of episodes of the daytime drama (soap opera) General Hospital. She later guest-starred on Dr. Quinn, Medicine Woman and ER, and acted in made-for-television movies. Her big break came in 1995 when she landed the role of villainess Brooke Armstrong Campbell on the Fox nighttime soap opera Melrose Place. She left the show after one year when producers decided to kill off the character. The following year, Davis guest-starred in two episodes of Seinfeld.

In 1998, Davis was cast as Charlotte York in the HBO romantic comedy series Sex and the City and remained an integral cast member until the series ended in 2004. In 1999, along with the rest of the cast, she was awarded the Women in Film Lucy Award in recognition of her excellence and innovation in her creative works that have enhanced the perception of women through the medium of television. She received Primetime Emmy Award nomination for Outstanding Supporting Actress in a Comedy Series her role as Charlotte in the final season, and well as Golden Globe Award for Best Supporting Actress – Series, Miniseries or Television Film nomination. During her time in the show, Davis guest-starred on Friends in the episode "The One with Ross's Library Book", and Will & Grace episode "Will & Grace & Vince & Nadine". She played leading roles in the 1999 miniseries Atomic Train alongside Rob Lowe, and television movies including Blacktop (2000), Three Days (2001) and The Winning Season (2004).

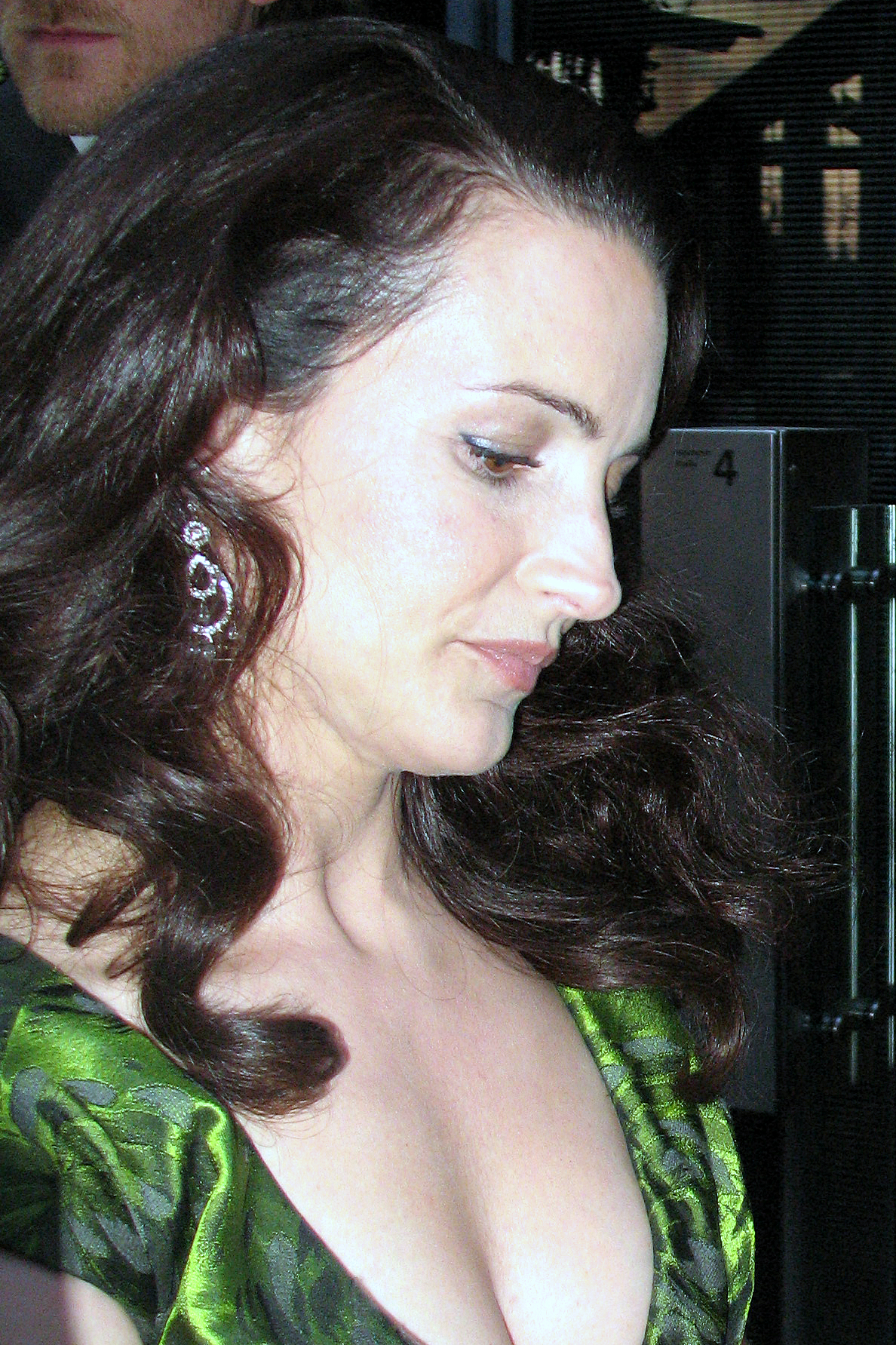
Davis at 2008 Berlin premiere of Sex and the City feature film

Davis hosted the VH1 show 200 Greatest Pop Culture Icons in 2003. In 2005, she starred in a television pilot entitled Soccer Moms in which she and Gina Torres star as suburban mothers who moonlight as private detectives. She starred as Miss Spider in the animated television series Miss Spider's Sunny Patch Friends and was a guest judge on the Lifetime program Project Runway.

In 2012, Davis starred in and produced the Lifetime television film Of Two Minds. In 2014, she returned to series television with starring role in the short-lived CBS sitcom Bad Teacher. In 2016, she starred in Hallmark Channel film A Heavenly Christmas. In 2020, she hosted Fox reality series Labor of Love.

=== Film ===
Davis made her movie debut in the 1988 comedy slasher film Doom Asylum. In 1990s, she had secondary roles in films Nine Months (1995) and Sour Grapes (1998). Her later films include The Adventures of Sharkboy and Lavagirl in 3D (2005), opposite David Arquette and George Lopez; the 2006 version of The Shaggy Dog, opposite Tim Allen, and Deck the Halls, opposite Matthew Broderick and Danny DeVito.

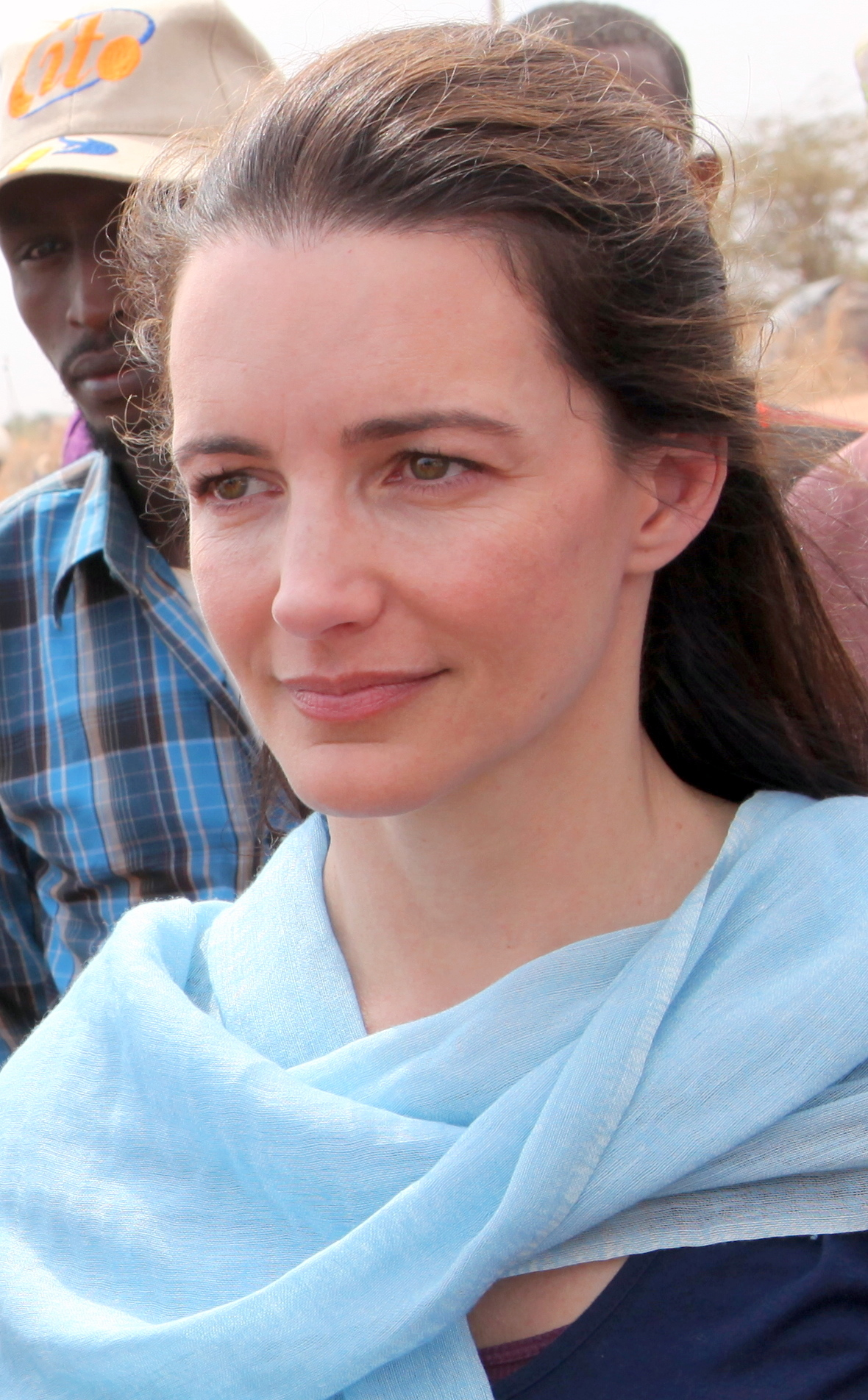
Davis in Dadaab, Kenya in July 2011

Davis appeared in 2008's Sex and the City feature film, under the direction of executive producer Michael Patrick King. The film was a box office success and amassed $415 million at the worldwide box office, despite mixed reviews. It was Davis' first movie to reach #1 at the US box office. Davis reprised her role of Charlotte York a second time in 2010's Sex and the City 2, which grossed $290 million worldwide but was widely panned by critics. She remained interested in a third installment of the franchise.

In 2009, Davis co-starred in the romantic comedy film Couples Retreat, a comedy chronicling four couples who partake in therapy sessions at a tropical island resort. Jon Favreau, who also co-wrote the script, played her husband. The film opened at No. 1 during its opening weekend at the US box office, making it her second film to do so. In 2010, Davis was cast as the mother of Josh Hutcherson's character in the adventure movie Journey 2: The Mysterious Island. The film opened theatrically in February 2012 and passed the $100 million mark at the US box office, being Davis' third film to achieve this.

In 2015, Davis was credited as producer on the documentary Gardeners of Eden, that comments on the illegal ivory trade. In 2019, Davis starred in and produced romantic comedy-drama film Holiday in the Wild for Netflix. The film was pitched to her, after the producers had noticed her philanthropic work with elephants. She later played a leading role and produced the 2021 thriller film Deadly Illusions about a bestselling female novelist (Davis) who is suffering from writer's block and hires an innocent young woman to watch over her twin children.

=== Stage ===
Davis made her Broadway debut in July 2012, when she replaced Kerry Butler in the revival of Gore Vidal's The Best Man at the Gerald Schoenfeld Theatre. She made her West End debut playing Beth Gallagher in Fatal Attraction at the Theatre Royal, Haymarket, in March 2014.

=== Additional ventures ===
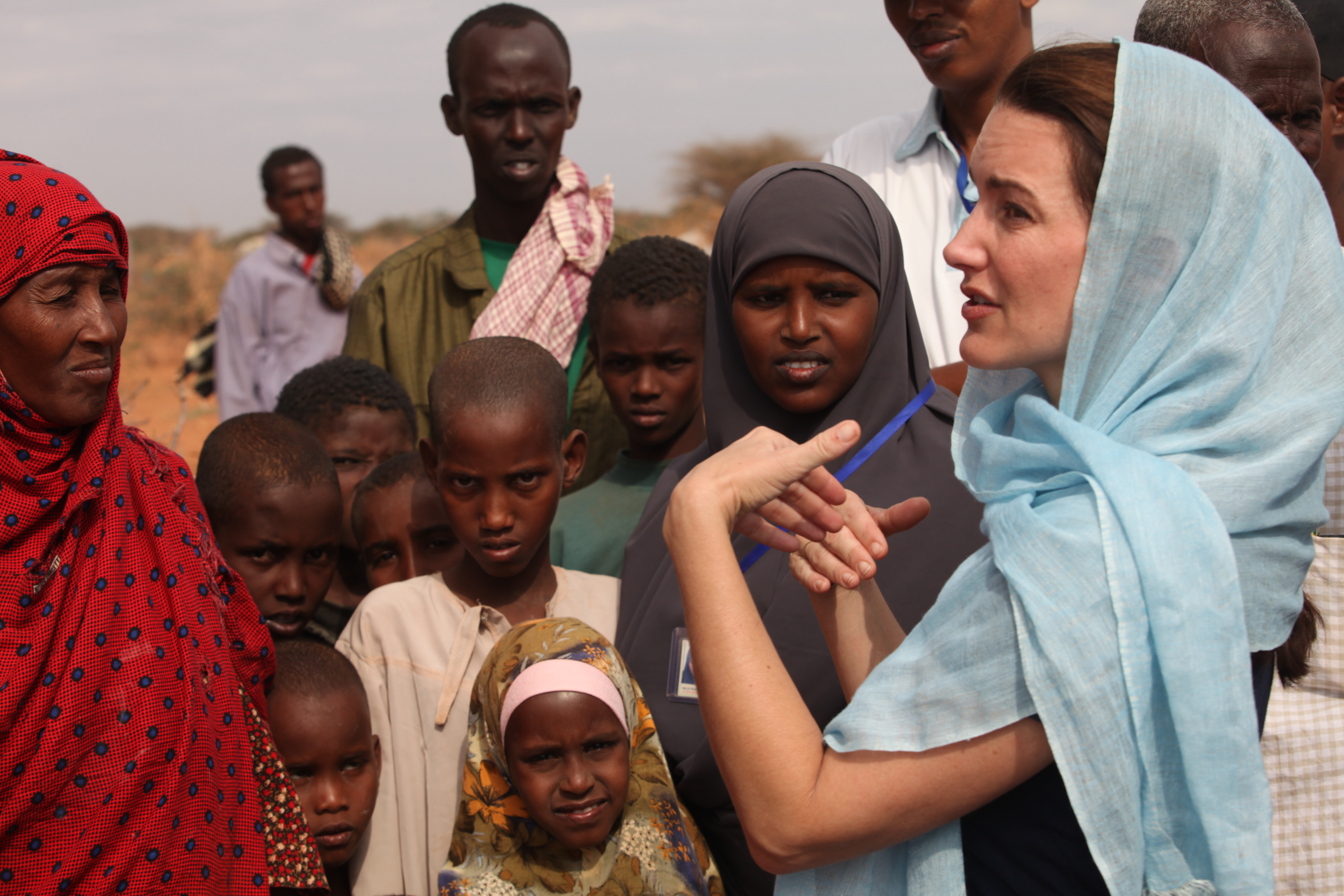
Oxfam Ambassador Davis visiting a Kenyan refugee camp in Dadaab, Kenya

Shortly after the wide release of the Sex and the City feature film, in June 2008, Belk, the nation's largest privately owned department store chain, announced a partnership with Davis. The arrangement includes a ladies' apparel and accessories line that debuted in 2008 in 125 store locations and online, with eventual plans for expanding availability to other store locations. In Belk's press release about the product line launch, Davis cited her upbringing in South Carolina as part of her inspiration for working with the chain. In late 2009 Belk cancelled the arrangement, citing the difficult economic conditions prevailing, while Davis said she hoped to take the line elsewhere.

=== Philanthropy and recognition ===
Davis is a Global Ambassador for Oxfam, and has campaigned in support of their work since 2004, travelling to locations including Haiti, Mozambique, and South Africa. In 2011 she gave a tearful interview with BBC News describing the situation at the Dadaab refugee camp in Kenya where she witnessed the impact of drought.

During her 2009 visit to Africa, Davis, a lifelong lover of elephants, discovered an abandoned baby elephant and arranged for it to be taken to a wildlife rehabilitation center. In recognition of the attention she has brought to the plight of orphaned African elephants, Davis won the Humane Society's 2010 Wyler Award, which is bestowed on a celebrity or public figure who has made news on behalf of animals. She is also a patron of the David Sheldrick Wildlife Trust which works to protect elephants and other wildlife in Kenya.

In 2023, Davis was awarded The Perfect World Foundation Award for her exceptional contributions to wildlife conservation and advocacy. This prestigious honor, often referred to as "The Conservationist of the Year," recognizes individuals who have made a significant impact on the protection of biodiversity.

Davis has worked with the United Nations High Commissioner for Refugees (UNHCR) and is included on their list of "High Profile Supporters". In 2015 she visited the Democratic Republic of Congo and Uganda. Davis later filmed a fund-raising appeal supporting the UNHCR, and in 2016 visited Australia to promote the UNHCR's work, focussing on the plight of women victims of sexual violence in Congo.

== Personal life ==
In 2011, Davis adopted a daughter, and in 2018, she adopted a son. The family resides in the hills of Brentwood, Los Angeles, California.

Davis is a recovering alcoholic and says she was introduced to alcohol early as part of her Southern upbringing.

== Filmography ==
=== Film ===
Year	Title	Role	Notes
1988	Doom Asylum	Jane	
1995	Nine Months	Tennis Attendant	
1995	Alien Nation: Body and Soul	Karina Tivoli	
1998	Traveling Companion	Annie	
1998	Sour Grapes	Riggs	
1999	Atomic Train	Megan Seger	
2000	Blacktop	Sylvia	
2005	The Adventures of Sharkboy and Lavagirl in 3-D	Max's Mom	
2006	The Shaggy Dog	Rebecca Douglas	
2006	Deck the Halls	Kelly Finch	
2008	Sex and the City	Charlotte York Goldenblatt	
2009	Couples Retreat	Lucy Tippaglio	
2010	Sex and the City 2	Charlotte York Goldenblatt	
2011	Jack and Jill	Delilah	
2012	Journey 2: The Mysterious Island	Elizabeth Anderson	
2019	Holiday in the Wild	Kate Conrad	Also executive producer
2021	Deadly Illusions	Mary Morrison	
2024	Cash Out	Amelia Decker	
2027	Beach Read †		Filming

=== Television ===
Year	Title	Role	Notes
1991	General Hospital	Betsy Chilson, R.N.	23 episodes
1991	N.Y.P.D. Mounted	Young Lady	Television film
1992	Mann & Machine	Cathy	Episode: "Billion Dollar Baby"
1993	The Larry Sanders Show	Bri	Episode: "The Breakdown: Part II"
1994	Dr. Quinn, Medicine Woman	Carey McGee	Episode: "Thanksgiving"
1995	ER	Leslie	Episode: "Luck of the Draw"
1995–1996	Melrose Place	Brooke Armstrong	32 episodes, recurring cast (season 3), main cast (season 4)
1996	The Ultimate Lie	Claire McGrath	Television film
1997	The Single Guy	Leslie	Episode: "Johnny Hollywood"
1997	A Deadly Vision	Babette Watson	Television film
1997	Seinfeld	Jenna	Episodes: "The Pothole" / "The Butter Shave"
1998–2004	Sex and the City	Charlotte York Goldenblatt	94 episodes
2000	Friends	Erin	Episode: "The One with Ross' Library Book"
2000	Sex and the Matrix	Charlotte York MacDougal	Short parody
2000	Take Me Home: The John Denver Story	Annie Denver	Television film
2000	Blacktop	Sylvia	Television film
2001	Someone to Love	Lorraine	Television film
2001	Three Days	Beth Farmer	Television film
2004	Will & Grace	Nadine	Episode: "Will & Grace & Vince & Nadine"
2004	The Winning Season	Mandy	Television film
2004–2008	Miss Spider's Sunny Patch Friends	Miss Spider	35 episodes (Voice role)
2005	Soccer Moms	Brooke	Television pilot
2012	Of Two Minds	Billie Clark	Television film, also producer
2014	Bad Teacher	Ginny Taylor-Clapp	13 episodes
2016	A Heavenly Christmas	Eve	Television film
2020	Labor of Love	Herself	Host
2021–2025	And Just Like That...	Charlotte York Goldenblatt	33 episodes, also executive producer

=== Theatre ===
Year	Title	Role	Location
2012	The Best Man	Mabel Cantwell	Gerald Schoenfeld Theatre
2014	Fatal Attraction	Beth Gallagher	Theatre Royal Haymarket

== Awards and nominations ==
Organizations	Year	Category	Work	Result	Ref.
American Comedy Award	2001	Funniest Supporting Female Performer in a TV Series	Sex and the City	Nominated	
Golden Globe Awards	2004	Best Supporting Actress – Series, Miniseries or Television Film	Sex and the City	Nominated	
Humane Society	2010	Wyler Award	Herself	Honored	
People's Choice Award	2009	Favorite Cast	Sex and the City	Nominated	
The Perfect World Foundation	2023	Conservationist of the year	Herself	Honored	
Primetime Emmy Awards	2004	Outstanding Supporting Actress in a Comedy Series	Sex and the City (Note: For the episode(s): "Hop, Skip, and a Week" + "Splat!")	Nominated	
Screen Actors Guild Awards	2001	Outstanding Ensemble in a Comedy Series	Sex and the City	Nominated	
Screen Actors Guild Awards	2002	Outstanding Ensemble in a Comedy Series	Sex and the City	Won	
Screen Actors Guild Awards	2003	Outstanding Ensemble in a Comedy Series	Sex and the City	Nominated	
Screen Actors Guild Awards	2004	Outstanding Ensemble in a Comedy Series	Sex and the City	Won	
Screen Actors Guild Awards	2005	Outstanding Ensemble in a Comedy Series	Sex and the City	Nominated	
Women in Film Honors	1999	Lucy Award	Herself	Honored	
