= Andrew Farmer =

Andrew Farmer may refer to:

- Andrew Farmer (politician) (born 1979), American politician
- Andrew Farmer (American football) (born 2000), American football linebacker
- Andrew Farmer, fictional character in Three Days (2001 film)
