= Holiday in the Wild =

- Promotional poster
- Directed by: Ernie Barbarash
- Written by: Neal Dobrofsky; Tippi Dobrofsky
- Produced by: Brad Krevoy; Amy Krell
- Starring: Rob Lowe; Kristin Davis
- Cinematography: Hein de Vos
- Edited by: Heath Ryan
- Music by: Alan Lazar
- Production company: MPCA
- Distributed by: Netflix
- Release date: November 1, 2019
- Running time: 86 minutes
- Countries: United States; Zambia
- Language: English

Holiday in the Wild is a 2019 American Christmas romantic comedy film directed by Ernie Barbarash from a screenplay by Neal Dobrofsky and Tippi Dobrofsky. It stars Rob Lowe and Kristin Davis.

The film was released on November 1, 2019, by Netflix.

== Plot ==
After their son Luke leaves for college, Kate Conrad, a former veterinarian, surprises her husband Drew with a second honeymoon to Zambia. Drew confesses that he is no longer in love with her and was waiting for their son to go to college before ending the marriage.

Kate decides to go on the trip alone. At dinner that evening, a man at the hotel bar, Derek, notices her and strikes up a conversation with her. Kate irritably confesses her situation and then leaves in a huff. The next day, Kate arrives for a chartered flight to her next resort, only to find Derek is the pilot.

During the flight, Derek unexpectedly lands the plane in the wild. They discover a traumatized baby elephant whose mother has been killed by poachers. Kate is intrigued by the elephant and when the rescue team arrives, Kate (who years earlier had trained as a veterinarian, but no longer practices) offers her services.

At the sanctuary, Kate meets Derek's South African girlfriend, Leslie, who is part of the foundation that funds the sanctuary. Kate forms a special bond with the elephant she and Derek found, and Derek's friend Jonathan suggests the name “Manu”, which means “second son”.

Kate extends her stay, even celebrating the Christmas season at the sanctuary. Her relationship with Derek deepens as they talk about their previous lives. But Kate is upset when she receives divorce papers from Drew at the Sanctuary. Luke comes to the sanctuary for Christmas and confesses he is unhappy in his business course; he wants to be a musician. Kate discourages him from this.

Leslie is angered when she discovers a portrait of Kate that Derek drew. Leslie asks Derek to go away with her, but he refuses and breaks up with her. She retorts that the board will cut funding for the sanctuary. Kate finally returns to New York, where she takes a job as a vet. She convinces her son to continue in college, but to study music.

On New Year's Eve, Kate calls Jonathan, and he relays that the sanctuary cannot continue operating much longer due to the cut in funding. Kate begins a fundraising campaign by asking for help from her friends and ex-husband, and also sells her jewelry and other things. The fundraising is successful and the sanctuary stays afloat. After visits from pampered pets, Kate realizes her job as a vet in New York is not fulfilling her, so she sells her apartment then buys a one-way ticket to Zambia to be with Derek and the elephants.

Kate and Derek get married. When the day comes to release Manu back to the wild with other elephants, Derek and Kate tearfully say goodbye.

== Cast ==
- Kristin Davis as Kate Conrad
- Rob Lowe as Derek Hollistan
- Fezile Mpela as Jonathan
- John Owen Lowe as Luke Conrad
- Colin Moss as Drew Conrad
- Chanelys Garcia Nyapisi as Nia
- Hayley Owen as Leslie Van De Mere-Jones
- Faniswa Yisa as Aaliyah
- Kgahliso Solomon as Lulu
- Thandi Puren as Trish
- Renate Stuurman as Tabitha
- Keeno Lee Hector as Doorman

== Production ==
In May 2018, it was reported that Ernie Barbarash would direct Christmas in the Wild for Netflix from a screenplay by Neal Dobrofsky and Tippi Dobrofsky. Filming was to take place in Hoedspruit and Drakensberg, and on sets in and around Cape Town. Principal photography commenced June 2018.

The elephant scenes were filmed at a sanctuary in South Africa, and at Game Rangers International Elephant Orphanage in Lusaka, Zambia. Huge efforts and systems were in place to safeguard the elephants, including a focused behavior study, personnel and distance restrictions, and international animal welfare inspectors.

Due to GRI's strict elephant management protocols and minimal impact policies, and in alignment with Netflix's high animal welfare standards, it became apparent that a body double would be required for the majority of filming, and Netflix invested hugely in ensuring that the puppets required were the spitting image of the real-life orphaned elephant Mkaliva.⁣⁣ Mkaliva was rescued by GRI and the Department of National Parks & Wildlife in Zambia in August 2017. Her story closely aligns with that portrayed in the film, as both elephants experienced the same physical and emotional traumas when losing their mothers and herd.

In the film, Rob Lowe's son, John Owen Lowe, played the son of Kristin Davis. Rob Lowe said of working together, "It was great. It was really fun."

== Release ==
Holiday in the Wild was released on November 1, 2019, by Netflix.

== Reception ==
On review aggregator Rotten Tomatoes, the film holds an approval rating of 38% based on eight reviews, with an average rating of 4.5/10. The Guardian gave the film 3 out of 5 stars. Emma Specter wrote sarcastically about the film for Vogue.

== See also ==
- List of Christmas films
