= Unstable (TV series) =

American television series

- Genre: Workplace comedy
- Created by: Rob Lowe & John Owen Lowe & Victor Fresco
- Showrunners: Victor Fresco; Andrew Gurland
- Starring: Rob Lowe; John Owen Lowe; Sian Clifford; Aaron Branch; Rachel Marsh; Emma Ferreira
- Music by: Mark Foster; Sven Faulconer
- Country of origin: United States
- Original language: English
- No. of series: 2
- No. of episodes: 16

Production
- Executive producers: Victor Fresco; Rob Lowe; John Owen Lowe; Marc Buckland; Andrew Gurland; Claire Scanlon; Sean Clements
- Producers: Hailey Chavez; Missy Mansour; Lisa Iannone; Kyle Weber
- Cinematography: Clark Mathis; Giovani Lampassi
- Editors: Andrew Doerfer; Lawrence Maddox; Mark Bourgeois; Pamela March
- Running time: 20–30 minutes
- Production companies: Garfield Grove; LoweProfile; Night Eater Productions

Original release
- Network: Netflix
- Release: March 30, 2023 – August 1, 2024

Unstable is an American workplace comedy television series starring Rob Lowe and his son John Owen Lowe, with both also acting as executive producers on the series, along with Victor Fresco. The series premiered on Netflix on March 30, 2023. In November 2023, it was renewed for a second season which was released on August 1, 2024. In October 2024, the series was canceled after two seasons.

== Synopsis ==
A father-son comedy in which socially shy son Jackson (John Owen Lowe) begins working for his successful, admired, but eccentric and narcissistic-adjacent father Ellis (Rob Lowe) at his high-tech bio research facility to help save him from spiraling further after the death of his wife.

== Cast ==
=== Main ===
- Rob Lowe as Ellis Dragon, the CEO and founder of a biotechnology company called Dragon
- John Owen Lowe as Jackson Dragon, Ellis's son, a flutist
- Sian Clifford as Anna, the CFO of Dragon
- Aaron Branch as Malcolm, Jackson's friend from childhood who previously worked as Ellis's assistant but now works as program manager at Dragon's Red Lab
- Rachel Marsh as Luna, a scientist working at Dragon's Red Lab
- Emma Pilar Ferreira as Ruby, another scientist working at Dragon's Red Lab and Luna's best friend

=== Recurring ===
- Fred Armisen as Leslie, a therapist the board of Dragon brought in to work with Ellis
- Tom Allen as TJ, a board member of Dragon who sits on the board alongside his twin, Chaz
- JT Parr as Chaz, TJ's twin who sits on the board with him
- Christina Chang as Jean (season 1), the best friend of Ellis's late wife, who sits on the board of Dragon
- Lamorne Morris as Peter (season 2), an old family friend of Ruby's and the founder of a biotech start-up named Magma
- Iris Apatow as Georgia (season 2), Anna's ex-stepdaughter who is an intern at Dragon

== Production ==
The show was picked up straight-to-series by Netflix and its formation was reportedly inspired by John Owen Lowe's social media trolling of his father Rob Lowe. John Owen Lowe described the series as "about a father-son dynamic that's very relatable but under a really specific lens, which is a father who loves being the center of attention and his son, who feels the exact opposite."

It was announced in April 2022 that Rob and John Owen Lowe would both act as executive producers on the show along with Victor Fresco, with production handled by the Netflix studio. In June 2022 the series added Sian Clifford to the cast alongside Rachel Marsh, Emma Ferreira, and Aaron Branch in series regular roles. Additionally, Fred Armisen, Tom Allen and JT Parr were announced in recurring roles. On May 4, 2023, it was reported that the second season (yet to officially renew) of production has been shut down due to the writers' strike. On November 16, 2023, the series was officially renewed for a second season with Andrew Gurland taking over as showrunner from Fresco, who was the showrunner for the first season for the eight-episode second series with production scheduled to begin in Los Angeles later that month. The season wrapped filming in early February 2024. On October 11, 2024, Netflix canceled the series.

== Episodes ==
=== Series overview ===
Season	Episodes	Originally released
1	8	March 30, 2023
2	8	August 1, 2024

=== Season 1 (2023) ===
No. overall	No. in season	Title	Directed by	Written by	Original release date
1	1	"Unstable"	Marc Buckland	Teleplay by : Victor Fresco; Story by : Rob Lowe & John Owen Lowe & Victor Fresco	March 30, 2023
Eccentric Los Angeles biotech CEO Ellis Dragon suffers a mental decline following the death of his wife. His CFO Anna Bennet worries that his erratic behavior and loss of focus at work jeopardizes the company. She has Ellis' estranged son Jackson, an aspiring flautist living in New York, come to Los Angeles to help Ellis recover from his downward spiral. Jackson resents his father for disregarding his ambitions and pressuring him to be more like him. The two briefly reconcile during a company karaoke event, after which Jackson plans to return to New York, but he is forced to stay when Anna and Ellis reveal that Ellis has held his company-issued therapist captive in his basement for attempting to extort him.
2	2	"Engaged, Focused and Ridiculously Sane"	Marc Buckland	Michael Shipley	March 30, 2023
3	3	"The Wizard of Odd"	Marc Buckland	Sean Clements	March 30, 2023
4	4	"Pilgrims and Sex Parties"	Jay Chandrasekhar	John Owen Lowe	March 30, 2023
5	5	"Beautiful Birthday Bastards"	Jay Chandrasekhar	Hailey Chavez	March 30, 2023
6	6	"The Ballad of Eduardo"	Marc Buckland	Sam Shanker	March 30, 2023
7	7	"Roasting For Beginners"	Marc Buckland	Bente Engelstoft	March 30, 2023
8	8	"A Dragon's Fire"	Marc Buckland	Michael A. Ross	March 30, 2023

=== Season 2 (2024) ===
No. overall	No. in season	Title	Directed by	Written by	Original release date
9	1	"Shanked"	Andrew Gurland	Andrew Gurland	August 1, 2024
10	2	"Winning Time"	Claire Scanlon	Sean Clements	August 1, 2024
11	3	"Retreat"	Claire Scanlon	Justin Nowell	August 1, 2024
12	4	"Mindhunter"	Rebecca Asher	Guy Endore-Kaiser	August 1, 2024
13	5	"MOCAP Man"	Rebecca Asher	Dominic Dierkes	August 1, 2024
14	6	"Dragon Slayer"	Claire Scanlon	John Owen Lowe	August 1, 2024
15	7	"Ron Tabasco"	Claire Scanlon	Samantha Shanker	August 1, 2024
16	8	"Ellis U"	Andrew Gurland	Teleplay by : Alexandra Rushfield and Kate Loveless; Story by : Alexandra Rushfield	August 1, 2024

== Release ==
The eight episodes of Unstable were released on March 30, 2023. The second season was released on August 1, 2024.

== Reception ==
The review aggregator website Rotten Tomatoes reported a 67% approval rating with an average rating of 6.3/10, based on 18 critic reviews. The website's critics consensus reads, "Unstable is a little wobbly as it veers between sincere family affair and scathing satire, but Rob Lowe's reliable comedic chops provide the necessary ballast." Metacritic, which uses a weighted average, assigned a score of 68 out of 100 based on 10 critics, indicating "generally favorable reviews".

Robert Lloyd of Los Angeles Times called the show an "adorable workplace comedy that's odd enough to feel fresh and traditional enough to feel good." Angie Han for The Hollywood Reporter said "it's very, very funny, thanks to a crackling combination of sharp writing, lovably eccentric characters and snappy comedic timing."
