= Reed Diamond =

American actor (born 1967)

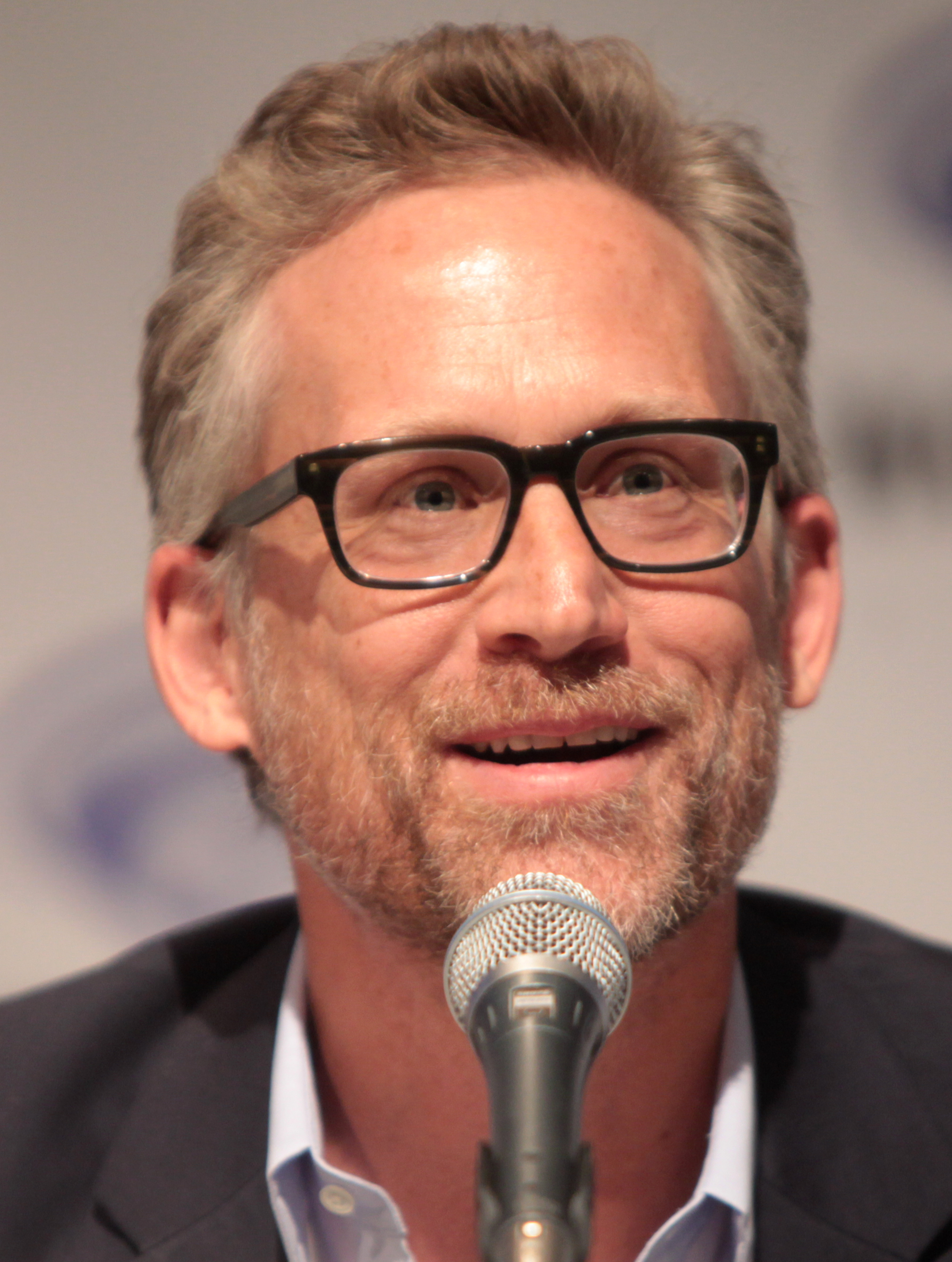
- Diamond at WonderCon 2015
- Born: Reed Edward Diamond; July 20, 1967 (age 59); New York City, U.S.
- Education: Juilliard School (BFA)
- Occupation: Actor
- Years active: 1973–present
- Spouses: Fredrika Kesten (m. 1995; div. 1997); Marnie McPhail (m. 2004)

Reed Edward Diamond (born July 20, 1967) is an American actor. He is known for the roles of Det. Mike Kellerman on Homicide: Life on the Street, Jason Pillar in season 8 of 24, and recurring character Laurence Dominic on Dollhouse. He also appeared in The Shield, Journeyman, Bones, The Mentalist, Franklin & Bash, and Underground. He had a recurring role on the first two seasons of Designated Survivor as John Foerstel, Director of the FBI, and portrayed Daniel Whitehall / Werner Reinhardt in the Marvel Cinematic Universe (MCU) television series Agents of S.H.I.E.L.D.

== Early life and education ==
Diamond was born in Brooklyn, the son of Allison, an astrologer, and Bob Diamond, a director of shows such as The Joe Franklin Show. He was raised in Manhattan and attended the Trinity School.

Diamond attended the University of North Carolina at Chapel Hill for two years, then studied acting at the Juilliard School, where he was a member of the Drama Division's Group 20 (1987–1991).

== Career ==
His early roles included guest starring on Law & Order and Class of '96, and such films as Memphis Belle (1990), Clear and Present Danger (1994) and Her Hidden Truth (1995).

His first big break came in 1995 when he joined the cast of Homicide: Life on the Street as Det. Mike Kellerman. Diamond was a regular cast member for Seasons 4–6 before Kellerman was written out at the end of Season 6; but he reprised the role for a two-episode story in the final Season 7. In 2000, a feature-length TV movie was produced to wrap up the series, which saw the return of all the major cast, including Diamond. He made a brief appearance as a police detective in the pilot episode of the 2002 pilot of the series The Shield, as Detective Terry Crowley. He was credited as one of the main cast members and featured prominently in promotional pictures of the show, so as to surprise viewers when he was murdered at the end of the first episode. Roles after that included a re-make of High Noon (2000); Three Days; S.W.A.T. (2003, directed by Diamond's Homicide co-star Clark Johnson); Spider-Man 2 (2004); and Good Night, and Good Luck (2005).

In the 2000s, as well as playing recurring roles in Judging Amy (as Stuart Collins) and Dollhouse (as Lawrence Dominic), Diamond guest-starred on Crossing Jordan, The West Wing, Medium, Numb3rs, CSI: Crime Scene Investigation, Stargate SG-1, Without a Trace, The Mentalist, 24, and Common Law. He portrayed Inspector Jack Vasser in the Fall 2007 NBC series Journeyman until the cancellation of the show in December 2007.

In the 2010s, Diamond appeared in the TNT series Franklin & Bash, as senior HYDRA agent Dr. Daniel Whitehall / Werner Reinhardt in the Marvel Cinematic Universe (MCU) television series Agents of S.H.I.E.L.D., and had roles in Firebreather, Moneyball, Common Law, and Wayward Pines. He played plantation owner Tom Macon on season one of WGN's series Underground.

== Personal life ==
Diamond was married to Fredrika Kesten from 1995 to 1997. Since 2004, he has been married to actress Marnie McPhail. They have a daughter.

== Filmography ==
=== Film ===
Year	Title	Role	Notes
1990	Memphis Belle	Sgt. Virgil Hoogesteger	
1994	Clear and Present Danger	Coast Guard Chief	
1995	Assassins	Bob	
2001	Madison	Skip Naughton	
2001	The Breed	Phil	
2003	S.W.A.T	Officer David Burress	
2004	Spider-Man 2	Algernon	
2005	Good Night, and Good Luck	John Aaron	
2005	Berkeley	Ralph	
2006	The Darkroom	The Man	
2007	Adrenaline	Voice of Harvey	
2007	Meet Bill	Paul	
2011	Moneyball	Mark Shapiro	
2012	Much Ado About Nothing	Don Pedro	
2017	Confessions of a Teenage Jesus Jerk	Brother Miller	
2019	Avengers: Endgame	Werner Reinhardt / Daniel Whitehall	Cameo; photograph
2019	Our Friend	Peter	
2020	Pearl	Marty Siegel	
2023	Off Ramp		
2025	Drop	Richard	

=== Television ===
Year	Title	Role	Notes
1975	Emergency!	Larry	1 Episode
1988	ABC Afterschool Special	Gary Farrell	
1991	Ironclads	Leslie Harmon	Television film
1991	Loving	Garth Watkins	
1991–2005	Law & Order	Mr. Klein / Christopher Baylor	
1992	O Pioneers!	Emil	Television film
1993	Class of '96	Stephen Sinclair	3 episodes
1993	Blind Spot	Charlie	Television film
1994	Under Suspicion	Bill Palmer	
1995	Awake to Danger	Jeffrey Baker	Television film
1995	Secrets	Thomas Rafferty	Television film
1995	Her Hidden Truth	Clay Devereaux	Television film
1995	919 Fifth Avenue	Ben Constant	Television film
1995	Homicide: Life on the Street	Detective Mike Kellerman	69 episodes
1996	Full Circle	Harry Winslow	Television film
1997	Mighty Ducks: The Animated Series	Falcone (voice)	Episode: "To Catch a Duck"
1997	Indefensible: The Truth About Edward Brannigan	Eddie Brannigan Jr.	Television film
1999	Judging Amy	Stuart Collins	19 episodes
2000	Homicide: The Movie	Private Investigator Mike Kellerman	Television film
2000	High Noon	Harvey Pell	Television film
2001	The Huntress	Mike Kaputo	3 episodes
2001	Family Law	Alan Caldwell	
2001	Three Days	Andrew Farmer	Television film
2002	Path to War	Duty officer	Television film
2002	Scared Silent	Doug Clifson	Television film
2002	Presidio Med	Will Raymond	2 episodes
2002	The Shield	Terry Crowley	3 episodes
2003	The Twilight Zone	Boyfriend	
2004	Crossing Jordan	Gordon Kimball	
2004	The West Wing	Dr. Mike Gordon	3 episodes
2005	Medium	Jared Swanstrom	
2005	CSI: Crime Scene Investigation	Ray Lester	
2005	Numb3rs	Dr. Kenneth Hill	
2006	Stargate SG-1	Major Bryce Ferguson	
2006	Without a Trace	Eric Hayes	
2006	Vanished	Therapist	3 episodes
2006	Ghost Whisperer	Dr. Martin Schaer	
2007	October Road	Gavin Goddard	
2007	Journeyman	Jack Vasser	13 episodes
2008	Criminal Minds	Craig Bridges	
2009	Drop Dead Diva	Chad Billmeyer	
2009	Monk	FBI Agent Stone	
2009	Castle	Dr. Cameron Talbot	
2009	Cold Case	Darren Musk	
2009	Dollhouse	Laurence Dominic	13 episodes
2010	24	Jason Pillar	8 episodes
2010	Firebreather	Barnes (voice)	Television film
2011	Law & Order: LA	Franklin Citron	
2011	The Mentalist	CBI Agent Ray Haffner	5 episodes
2011–2014	Franklin & Bash	Damien Karp	40 episodes
2012	Desperate Housewives	Gregg Limon	2 episodes
2012	The Glades	Councilman Greg Dousett	
2012	Common Law	Robert Yule	
2012	Bones	FBI Special Agent Hayes Flynn	4 episodes
2012	Revolution	Sergeant Wheatley	6 episodes
2013	White Collar	Cole Edwards	
2014–2015; 2018	Agents of S.H.I.E.L.D.	Werner Reinhardt / Daniel Whitehall	10 episodes
2014–2015	State of Affairs	Jules	3 episodes
2015	Wayward Pines	Harold Ballinger	8 episodes
2015	Minority Report	Henry Blomfeld	5 episodes
2016	Underground	Tom Macon	10 episodes
2016–2018	Designated Survivor	John Forstell	19 episodes
2017	Feud: Bette and Joan	Peter	2 episodes
2018	The Purge	Albert Stanton	6 episodes
2019	Billions	Evan Robards	Episode: "Overton Window"
2019	Hawaii Five-0	Claude Nostromo	Episode: "Ke iho mai nei ko luna"
2019	The Terror: Infamy	Colonel Stallings	3 episodes
2019	How to Get Away with Murder	David Golan	Episode: "I'm the Murderer"
2020	13 Reasons Why	Hansen Foundry	7 episodes
2021	Leverage: Redemption	Fletcher Maxwell	2 episodes
2021	Bosch	Vincent Franzen	5 episodes
2022	Better Call Saul	Sommelier David	Episode: "Fun and Games"
2023	Orphan Black: Echoes	Tom	10 episodes

=== Video games ===
Year	Title	Role	Notes
2019	Telling Lies	Special Agent Michael Campbell	
