= Of Two Minds (2012 TV film) =

- Film poster
- Genre: Drama
- Written by: Richard Friedenberg
- Directed by: Jim O'Hanlon
- Starring: Kristin Davis; Tammy Blanchard; Joel Gretsch
- Theme music composer: Samuel Sim
- Country of origin: United States
- Original language: English

Production
- Executive producers: Kristin Davis; Daniel Ostroff; Frank Konigsberg
- Producers: Kyle A. Clark; Eileen Fields; Lina Wong
- Cinematography: Ousama Rawi
- Editor: Charles Bornstein
- Running time: 85 minutes
- Production companies: Daniel Ostroff Productions; Silver Screen Pictures

Original release
- Network: Lifetime
- Release: March 10, 2012

Of Two Minds is a television movie following a family that struggles to care for a loved one suffering from schizophrenia. The story revolves around two sisters and their challenging relationship as they are faced with troubling situations and difficult situations many people deal with when caring for schizophrenic family members.

The film stars Emmy-nominated actress Kristin Davis as Billie, Emmy Award winning actress Tammy Blanchard as Elizabeth ('Baby'), and Oscar winner Louise Fletcher. Of Two Minds is a Lifetime original movie that was written by Oscar nominated Richard Friedenberg and released on March 10, 2012.

== Plot ==
Of Two Minds follows the challenging relationship between two sisters, Billie Clark (Kristen Davis) and Elizabeth 'Baby' Clark (Tammy Blanchard). Baby has schizophrenia and lives with their mother who helps care for her while Billie settles down happily with her family. When their mother has a sudden stroke, Billie takes on the responsibility of caring for her younger sister and moves into their childhood home along with her husband (Joel Gretsch) and two children (Mackenzie Aladjem and Alex le Bas). Baby's swiftly changing moods and uncontrollable episodes bring high levels of stress to the family while they try to adjust to the new living arrangements until a disturbing incident occurs between Billie's son and Baby. Afterwards, it is clear to Billie that she is not in a position to handle Baby's illness and is faced with a difficult decision on how to properly care for her sister while she considers what is best for Baby and for her family.

== Cast ==
- Kristin Davis as Billie Clark
- Tammy Blanchard as Elizabeth ‘Baby’ Clark
- Joel Gretsch as Rick Clark
- Bonnie Bartlett as Kathleen
- Mackenzie Aladjem as Mollie Clark
- Alex le Bas as Davis Clark
- Jessica Lundy as Madeleine
- Anthony Azizi as Dr. Lewis
- Louise Fletcher as Aunt Will

== Reception ==
The film was generally well received upon its television debut. Huffington Post critic Jackie K. Cooper reported that it was an "engrossing movie and is led by a pitch perfect performance by Tammy Blanchard." Cooper concluded his review with saying: "It is an outstanding presentation which tackles a serious subject." Michael Starr of the New York Post reviewed the film and said that "Of Two Minds doesn't pander to its audience, and tries earnestly to give us a sense of what it is like to deal with a very real affliction." The film was later honored at the 17th Annual Prism Showcase with an award for Best TV Movie or Mini-Series for the film's authentic portrayal of health issues.
