= John Owen Lowe =

American writer and actor (born 1995)

- Born: November 6, 1995 (age 31); Los Angeles, California, U.S.
- Other name: John Lowe
- Education: Stanford University
- Occupations: Writer; actor; producer
- Years active: 2015–present
- Father: Rob Lowe
- Relatives: Chad Lowe (uncle)

John Owen Lowe (born November 6, 1995) is an American writer, producer and actor.

== Early life ==
John Owen Lowe was born on November 6, 1995, in Los Angeles, California, the son of make-up artist Sheryl Berkoff and actor Rob Lowe. He graduated with a bachelor's degree in science, technology, and society from Stanford University in 2018. He has an older brother named Matthew who works as a lawyer.

== Career ==
From 2015, Lowe appeared in a recurring role in comedy series The Grinder. In 2017, he appeared on The Lowe Files, in which his family explored unsolved mysteries. He appeared in the Christmas film Holiday in the Wild in 2019, and worked as a writer on multiple episodes of 9-1-1: Lone Star.

In March 2023, Lowe began starring in the Netflix comedy series Unstable, which he also executive produced alongside his father and Victor Fresco. The series was inspired by Lowe's relationship with his father. He also featured in the second season which was released in August 2024.

Lowe was actor and producer on psychological thriller film Grace Point, released in January 2025, co-starring Andrew McCarthy and directed and co-written by Rory Karpf.

== Personal life ==
Lowe is a keen pianist. In 2018, following problems with addiction, he began a sober lifestyle. In 2023, he bought a home in Sherman Oaks previously owned by dancer Derek Hough.

== Filmography ==
=== Film ===
Year	Title	Role	Notes	Ref.
2019	Holiday in the Wild	Luke		
2025	Grace Point	Brandon	Also producer	
2027	Jason	Jake	Post-production	

=== Television ===
Year	Title	Role	Notes	Ref.
2015–2016	The Grinder	Joel	5 episodes	
2017	The Lowe Files	Himself	9 episodes	
2023–2024	Unstable	Jackson	Also creator, producer and writer	
