= The Lowe Files =

- Genre: Non fiction
- Presented by: Rob Lowe
- Country of origin: United States
- Original language: English
- No. of seasons: 1
- No. of episodes: 9

Production
- Running time: 60 minutes

Original release
- Network: A&E
- Release: August 2 – September 27, 2017

The Lowe Files is a series on the A&E Network that looks at unsolved mysteries within the United States. The show is hosted by Rob Lowe and his sons John Owen Lowe and Edward Matthew Lowe.

== Episodes ==
The series aired 9 episodes. It was cancelled after one season.

#	Title	Original release date
1	"Haunted Boy's Reformatory"	August 2, 2017
The Lowes investigate hauntings at Preston Castle in Ione, California.
2	"The Secret Underwater Base"	August 9, 2017
The Lowes team up with MUFON to investigate tales of tunnels beneath Los Angeles and attempt to answer what the recent Google Earth images of the waters off California's coast actually show.
3	"Bigfoot"	August 16, 2017
The Lowes visit the Redwood Forest and the Hoopa Indian Reservation in search of Bigfoot.
4	"Alien Abduction"	August 23, 2017
The Lowes visit Phoenix, AZ, known for its UFO sightings, then meet with famous alien abductee Travis Walton.
5	"Fear"	August 30, 2017
The Lowes travel to Boise, Idaho to visit the haunted Old State Penitentiary to meet with an expert the psychology of fear.
6	"America's Secret Space Program"	September 6, 2017
The Lowes head to Dugway Proving Ground to investigate sightings of strange lights – are they UFOs or top secret military aircraft?
7	"Mind Games"	September 13, 2017
The Lowes investigate remote viewing and other forms of ESP.
8	"The Wood Apes"	September 20, 2017
The Lowes head to Oklahoma in search of Bigfoot who the locals refer to by another name, The Wood Ape.
9	"It's About the Journey"	September 27, 2017
The Lowes reflect on their journey over the past 8 weeks.
