= Deadly Illusions =

2021 film by Anna Elizabeth James

- Release poster
- Directed by: Anna Elizabeth James
- Written by: Anna Elizabeth James
- Produced by: Greer Grammer; Shanola Hampton; Anna Elizabeth James
- Starring: Kristin Davis; Dermot Mulroney; Greer Grammer; Shanola Hampton
- Cinematography: Mike McMillin
- Edited by: F. Brian Scofield
- Music by: Drum & Lace
- Production companies: Voltage Pictures; Kiss and Tale Productions
- Distributed by: Netflix
- Release date: March 18, 2021
- Running time: 114 minutes
- Country: United States
- Language: English

Deadly Illusions is a 2021 American erotic thriller film written and directed by Anna Elizabeth James and starring Kristin Davis, Dermot Mulroney, Greer Grammer, and Shanola Hampton.

== Plot ==
Mary Morrison, a successful author of thriller novels, is happily married to Tom with two young children. Her publisher, asking her to write another book, offers a two million dollar advance; she initially declines but has to accept after Tom says he lost half of their reserves on a risky investment. Mary's friend Elaine suggests hiring a nanny to help with the kids as she writes and, after a few interviews, she employs Grace.

Mary has writer's block and uses her blossoming friendship with Grace to inspire her. Mary then starts having what appears to be sexual fantasies about Grace. She also seems to dream about Grace and Tom engaging in sexual activity in the kitchen, but cannot tell if it is real or her vivid imagination. Confronting them both at the dinner table in a tearful rage, she upsets the children and causes a divide between her and Grace.

The following morning, Mary apologizes to Grace, saying her outburst was the result of working too hard. She then calls the nanny agency to ask why they haven't cashed her check yet, and they tell her it's because she hasn't gotten back to them about her choice of a nanny. Mary asks if they have a nanny called Grace in their service and they say no.

Mary goes to see Elaine and finds her dead with a pair of scissors in her neck. Contacting the police, to her surprise and horror, she learns she is the main suspect. The police reveal there is a great deal of incriminating evidence, including a video of what appears to be Mary arriving at Elaine's house, although her face is obscured with a headscarf and sunglasses, and her latest book has a murder with scissors.

Mary then travels to Grace's hometown, visiting her aunt, who reveals Grace had been abused by her parents as a child, and herself also exhibiting odd behavior. Mary calls Tom to warn him about Grace but he does not answer. At home, he is in the shower when Grace walks in dressed in lingerie and brandishing a large knife. She continuously switches from her usual sweet, soft-toned self to a violent seducer with a deep voice. As she attacks Tom, Mary arrives home. Grace claims to not know what happened, repeatedly saying, "I couldn't stop her." Grace has dissociative identity disorder, and her other identity "Margaret" is who attacked Tom. Mary eventually knocks Grace unconscious.

One year later, Mary and her family are together. Mary takes the finished manuscript of her new book to Elaine's grave and leaves it there, as it was Elaine who encouraged her to start writing again. She then goes to visit Grace in a mental hospital. The film ends with "Mary" leaving the hospital, her face obscured by a headscarf and sunglasses, as in the police video of Elaine's killer.

== Cast ==
- Kristin Davis as Mary Morrison
- Dermot Mulroney as Tom Morrison
- Greer Grammer as Grace
- Shanola Hampton as Elaine
- Marie Wagenman as Alex
- Shylo Molina as Sam
- Melissa Chambers as Grace's aunt
- Shaun Wu as Kioki
- Abella Bala as Darlene

== Production ==
The film was shot in Albuquerque, New Mexico, in 2019.

== Release ==
The film was released on Netflix on March 18, 2021. It was the most-watched film on the platform in its first weekend.

== Critical response ==
On the review aggregator website Rotten Tomatoes, the film holds an approval rating of 23% based on 13 reviews, with an average rating of 3.5/10. Lisa Kennedy of Variety commented that “There are tropes galore in ‘Deadly Illusions’ that act as red herrings, breadcrumbs toward the truth, or MacGuffins, all of which underscore the debt ‘Deadly Illusions’ owes to Hitchcock. There's Grace's ribboned braid, a shower scene, a pair of shearing scissors employed lethally. There are nods, too, to Brian De Palma. It's enough to give a viewer vertigo.”
