= Greer Grammer =

American actress and beauty queen (born 1992)

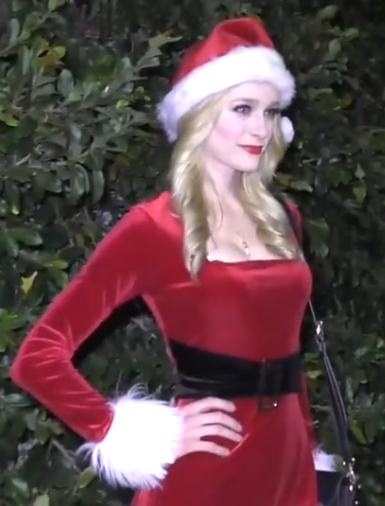
- Grammer in October 2016
- Born: Kandace Greer Grammer; February 15, 1992 (age 34); Los Angeles, California, U.S.
- Occupation: Actress
- Years active: 2010–present
- Parents: Kelsey Grammer (father); Barrie Buckner (mother)
- Relatives: Spencer Grammer (half-sister)

Kandace Greer Grammer (born February 15, 1992) is an American actress and former beauty queen. She is best known for her role as Lissa Miller in the MTV series Awkward and for her role in the 2021 Netflix-released film Deadly Illusions.

== Early life ==
Grammer is the daughter of actor Kelsey Grammer and stylist Barrie Buckner. She was named after actress Greer Garson. Early in life she became largely estranged from her father until they coincidentally reconnected at a Christmas tree lot when she was 16 while she was doing community service as Miss Teen Malibu.

Grammer attended Idyllwild Arts Academy for two years, receiving training under their theater program.

Grammer served as Miss Golden Globe 2015 at the 72nd Golden Globe Awards.

== Pageant competitions ==
Grammer entered her first beauty pageant in 2008, winning the title of Miss Teen Malibu. She went on to place within the top 10 in the Miss California Teen competition. She competed again the following year, successfully retaining her crown and again placing within the Top 10 of the state competition. In 2009, she represented the Marina Del Rey region, placing in the Top 10 of the 2010 state competition for the third year in a row. That year, Grammer also held the title of Miss Regional California Teen 2011.

Grammer competed at the Miss California Teen 2011 competition representing Thousand Oaks. She placed in the Top 10. After this competition, she retired from beauty pageants.

== Acting career ==
Grammer's first acting role was on a 2010 episode of iCarly ("iSpace Out").

It was announced in June 2015 that Grammer would be starring in the upcoming Lifetime original movie, Manson's Lost Girls, to be released in 2016. In July 2015, it was announced that she would be starring as Summer Roberts in The Unauthorized O.C. Musical, a stage adaptation of the pilot episode of The O.C.

In 2016, Grammer began a recurring role on the ABC sitcom The Middle, playing Axl Heck's girlfriend April. The role lasted until 2017. In 2021, she acted in the thriller drama film, Deadly Illusions.

In June 2024, it was announced that Grammer had been cast as an older version of Roz Doyle's daughter Alice in the Frasier sequel series.

== Filmography ==
=== Films ===
Title	Year	Role
Manson's Lost Girls	2016	Performer (Song)
Deadly Sorority	2017	Samantha Blake
Roe v. Wade	2019	Sarah Weddington
The Last Summer	2019	Christine Purdy
Story Game	2020	Nicole
Second Team (Short)	2020	Actor #2
Burning at Both Ends	2021	Juliet
Ted Bundy: American Boogeyman	2021	Cheryl Thomas
Deadly Illusions	2021	Grace
Creating Christmas	2023	Harper
Deltopia	2023	Allie
Howdy, Neighbor!	2023	Diamond Hopkins
The Ghost Trap	2024	Anja
Held Hostage in My House	2024	Kate Marks
The 12 Dates of Christmas	2026	Bridget

=== TV Series ===
TV Series	Years	Role	Episodes
Awkward	2011–2016	Lissa Miller	65
The Middle	2016–2017	April	7
Foursome	2017	Marge	1
The Goldbergs	2021	Mandy	1
Frasier	2024	Alice	2
