= Perfect Strangers (2004 film) =

- Written by: Simon Booker
- Directed by: Robin Sheppard
- Starring: Rob Lowe; Anna Friel; Khandi Alexander; Sarah Alexander; Jennifer Baxter
- Music by: Adrian Johnston
- Country of origin: United Kingdom
- Original language: English

Production
- Executive producers: Analisa Barreto; Simon Wright
- Producer: Ann Wingate
- Cinematography: Michael McMurray
- Editor: Ralph Brunjes
- Running time: 120 minutes
- Production company: Working Title Films

Original release
- Network: CBS
- Release: October 17, 2004

Perfect Strangers is a 2004 British romantic comedy film starring Rob Lowe and Anna Friel.

== Plot summary ==
Lloyd and Susie in London work for the same ad agency, but in different cities. An arrangement is made where they switch jobs and homes for a month. After settling into each other's place they consult each other by phone. It's not long before they fall in love.

== Cast ==
- Rob Lowe as Lloyd Rockwell
- Anna Friel as Susie Wilding
- Khandi Alexander as Christie Kaplan
- Sarah Alexander as Alix Mason
- Jennifer Baxter as Betsy
- Gabriel Hogan as Harvey Truelove
- Jane Luk as Dee Dee
- Colin Fox as Sir Nigel
- Katie Bergin as Kathy
