= Three Days (2001 film) =

2001 television film directed by Michael Switzer

- Film poster
- Written by: Robert Tate Miller; Eric Tuchman
- Directed by: Michael Switzer
- Starring: Kristin Davis; Reed Diamond; Tim Meadows
- Music by: Deddy Tzur
- Country of origin: United States
- Original language: English

Production
- Cinematography: Eric Van Haren Noman
- Editor: Micky Blythe
- Running time: 100 minutes
- Production companies: Saban Entertainment; Von-Zerneck-Sertner Films

Original release
- Network: ABC Family
- Release: December 9, 2001

Three Days is an American television film directed by Michael Switzer and starring Kristin Davis, Reed Diamond and Tim Meadows. It premiered on ABC Family on December 9, 2001 as a part of its 25 Days of Christmas programming block and was filmed in Halifax, Nova Scotia, Canada. The film received a limited Region 2 DVD release, in PAL format. The film had been available on the Disney+ streaming service from launch in 2019 until October 2022.

== Summary ==
Ten years ago, Andrew Farmer (Reed Diamond) married his childhood sweetheart, Beth (Kristin Davis) and the two live in Boston, Massachusetts. Now Andrew is a high-powered literary agent, and his relationship with his wife has not fared as well. After a marital argument about his possible infidelity on Christmas Eve, Beth runs out at midnight and, while trying to retrieve their neighbors' dog in the middle of the street, is killed by a car. An angel, Lionel (Tim Meadows), gives Andrew the chance to relive the last three days as if his wife was alive. However, he cannot change the fate of his wife. There's only one gift he can give to save her life and he only has a very short time to figure out what that gift is. So Andrew spends three days trying to make Beth as happy and figure how to keep her alive, while finding out what he would really be losing.

== Cast ==
- Kristin Davis ... Beth Farmer
- Reed Diamond ... Andrew Farmer
- Danielle Brett ... Kimberly
- Tim Meadows ... Lionel
- Cedric Smith
- Alexa Gilmour ... Megan Harrison Hopkins

== Production ==
The original story and teleplay was conceived and written by Robert Tate Miller while living in the North Hollywood neighborhood of Los Angeles. "I was inspired by Frank Capra's It's a Wonderful Life," Miller said. "I wanted to write a story with heart and, unlike most scripts which take many weeks to hammer out, Three Days came very quickly. It was as if the story wrote itself."

== See also ==
- List of Christmas films
- List of films about angels
