= Rob Lowe =

American actor (born 1964)

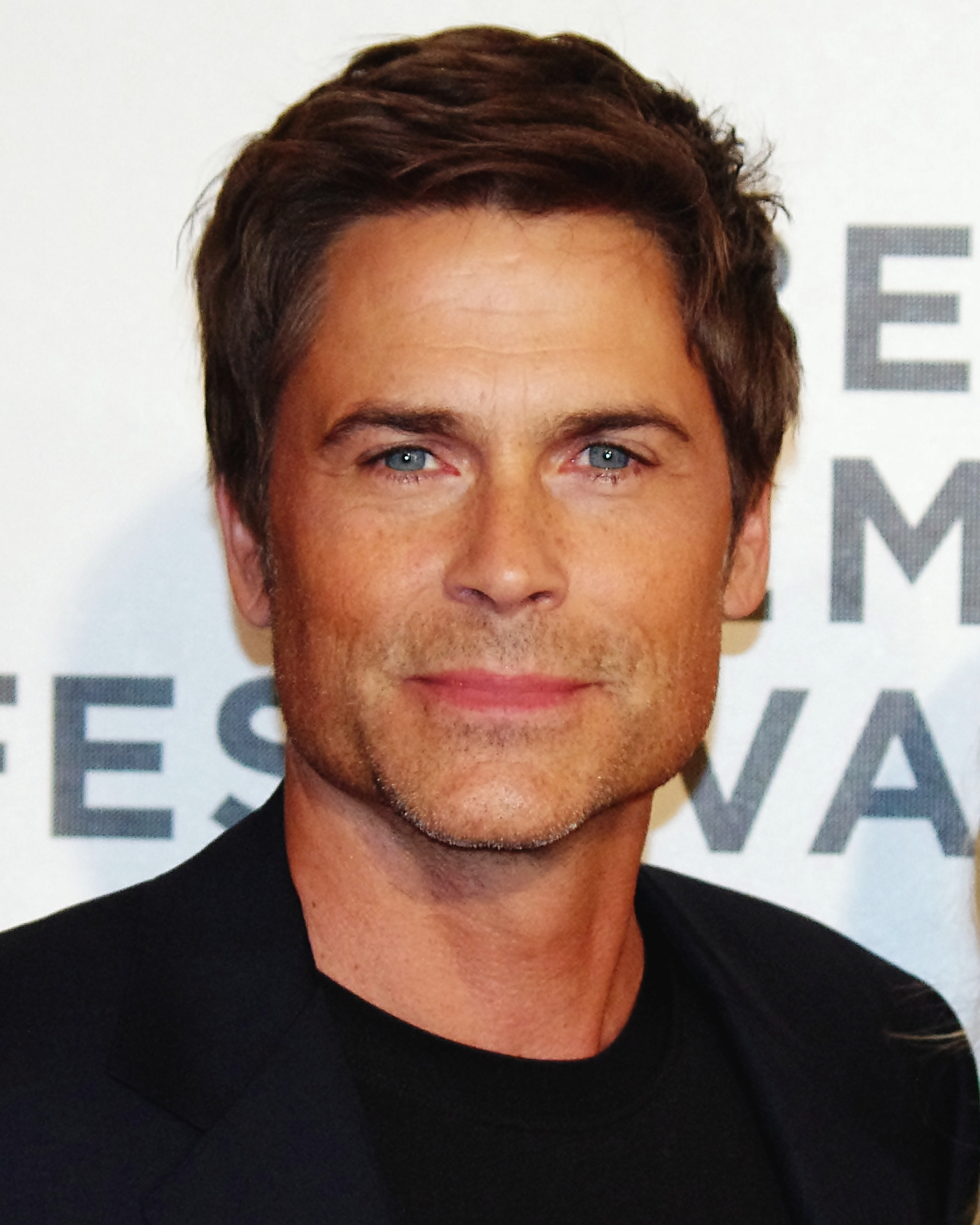
- Lowe in 2012
- Born: Robert Hepler Lowe; March 17, 1964 (age 62); Charlottesville, Virginia, U.S.
- Occupations: Actor, filmmaker, podcast and game show host
- Years active: 1979–present
- Political party: Democratic (1980–2006); Independent (2006–present)
- Spouse: Sheryl Berkoff (m. 1991)
- Children: 2, including John Owen
- Relatives: Chad Lowe (brother)

Robert Hepler Lowe (born March 17, 1964) is an American actor and entertainment host. Following numerous television roles in the early 1980s, he came to prominence as a teen idol and member of the Brat Pack with starring roles in The Outsiders (1983), Class (1983), The Hotel New Hampshire (1984), Oxford Blues (1984), St. Elmo's Fire (1985), About Last Night... (1986), Youngblood (1986), Masquerade (1988), and Bad Influence (1990). Experiencing a career decline in the 1990s, Lowe mostly starred as a lead in direct-to-video and television film productions, while having supporting roles in widely released comedy films like Wayne's World (1992), Tommy Boy (1995), and Austin Powers: The Spy Who Shagged Me (1999).

Lowe returned to prominence portraying Sam Seaborn in the NBC political drama series The West Wing (1999–2003), for which he received nominations for a Primetime Emmy Award and two Golden Globe Awards. His other series roles include Robert McCallister on the ABC drama Brothers & Sisters (2006–2010), Chris Traeger on the NBC sitcom Parks and Recreation (2010–2015), and Captain Owen Strand on the Fox drama 9-1-1: Lone Star (2020–2025). He was also nominated for an Actor Award for playing John F. Kennedy in the television film Killing Kennedy (2013) and received another Golden Globe Award nomination for his role of Dr. Jack Startz in Behind the Candelabra (2013).

He currently hosts his podcast Literally! with Rob Lowe (2020–present) and the game show The Floor (2024–present).

== Early life ==
Robert Lowe was born in Charlottesville, Virginia, to Barbara (née Hepler), a teacher, and Charles 'Chuck' Davis Lowe, a trial lawyer. While still a baby, he lost complete hearing in his right ear as a result of undiagnosed mumps. His parents divorced when Lowe and his younger brother Chad were young. Lowe was baptized in the Episcopal Church. He is of German, English, Irish, Scottish and Welsh ancestry. On the show Who Do You Think You Are?, Lowe found out that one of his ancestors, Christopher East, served as a Hessian soldier during the U.S. War of Independence. His ancestor served under the command of Colonel Johann Gottlieb Rall and was captured at the American victory at Trenton, New Jersey, on the morning of December 26, 1776. As a POW, his ancestor was given a choice, and took the option to stay in the United States. He has two half brothers from the second marriages of his parents, the producer Micah Dyer (maternal) and Justin Lowe (paternal).

Lowe grew up in Dayton, Ohio, in a "traditional American setting". He attended Oakwood Junior High School before moving to the Point Dume area of Malibu, California, with his mother and brother. In California, he attended Santa Monica High School, where he met Charlie Sheen. In his autobiography Stories I Only Tell My Friends, he wrote regarding Sheen, "We were both nerds [...] he wanted to be a baseball player." On a March 25, 2019, episode of the WTF with Marc Maron podcast, Lowe boasted that he was once capable of bench pressing 135 pounds as a senior member of Santa Monica High School's baseball team, which has become a reoccurring punchline on his Literally podcast.

== Career ==
=== 1976–1998: Early roles and leading man stardom ===
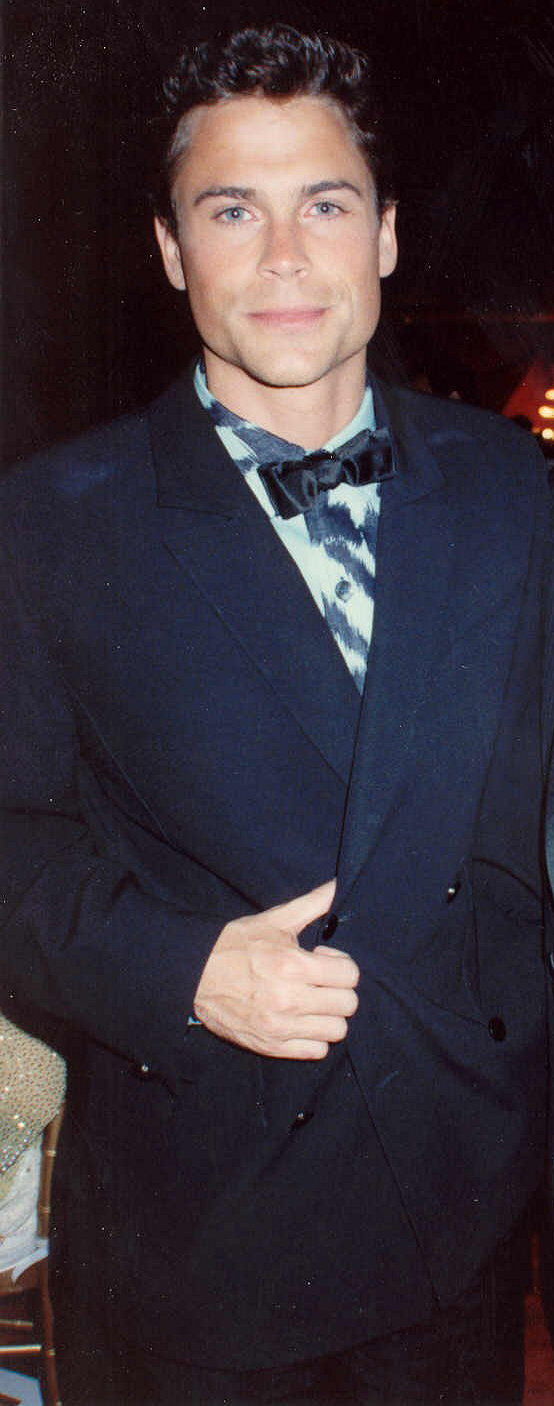
Lowe at the Governor's Ball party after the 1989 Academy Awards

Lowe got his first professional acting role in 1976 when he was 12 and still living in Dayton. He played an errand boy in a production of Sherlock Holmes at the Wright State University summer theater. He landed the part by calling every local theater and asking each if there was a part for a child in a play. Lowe was paid $150 for the role. In 1979, Lowe landed the part of Tony Flanagan in the short-lived television comedy A New Kind of Family. One of Lowe's earliest roles came in the 1983 television film Thursday's Child, for which he received his first Golden Globe Award nomination for Best Supporting Actor in a Series, Miniseries, or Television Film. He also appeared in the music video for The Go-Go's song, "Turn to You".

His breakthrough roles, however, were in 1983 as Sodapop Curtis in Francis Ford Coppola's cinematic adaptation of S. E. Hinton's novel, The Outsiders, where he shared the screen with an ensemble cast that included Tom Cruise, Matt Dillon, Emilio Estevez, Leif Garrett, C. Thomas Howell, Diane Lane, Ralph Macchio, and Patrick Swayze, and as "Skip" Burroughs IV in the coming-of-age comedy film Class along with Andrew McCarthy and Jacqueline Bisset. Next in 1984, he starred opposite Jodie Foster in Tony Richardson's The Hotel New Hampshire, and opposite Ally Sheedy and Amanda Pays in the sports picture Oxford Blues. Lowe and Estevez reunited in St. Elmo's Fire (1985), making them two of the more prominent actors in the group known as the Brat Pack. About Last Night... (1986) followed, with Demi Moore (who had starred alongside Lowe in St. Elmo's Fire). He then received his second Golden Globe nomination for Best Supporting Actor for his role as the mentally disabled Rory in Square Dance (1987).

In August 1987, he performed on stage, playing Baron Tusenbach in Chekov's The Three Sisters at The Williamstown Theatre Festival. In 1993, while filming a British TV production of the Tennessee Williams play Suddenly, Last Summer with Maggie Smith and Natasha Richardson, he recalled in an interview that he had run into Paul Newman four years earlier at the Williamstown Theatre Festival, and that Newman had encouraged him to continue to work in theatre. In 1988, he starred in the thriller Masquerade. In 1989, as part of the opening ceremony for the (critically derided) telecast of the 61st Academy Awards produced by Allan Carr, Lowe made his musical debut singing a reworked duet of Creedence Clearwater Revival's "Proud Mary" alongside actress Eileen Bowman, who was dressed as an unauthorized depiction of Snow White. In the 1990s, Lowe appeared in Wayne's World (1992), The Stand (1994), based on Stephen King's book of the same name, Tommy Boy (1995) and Contact (1997).

=== 1999–2009: The West Wing and acclaim ===
Lowe played Young Number Two in Austin Powers: The Spy Who Shagged Me (1999), and reprised his role in Austin Powers in Goldmember (2002). He starred as Sam Seaborn in the television series The West Wing from 1999 to 2003 (and briefly in 2006). His performance in the show garnered Lowe a Primetime Emmy Award nomination and two Golden Globe nominations for Best Actor in a Drama Series. Lowe was drawn to the role because of his personal love of politics, and his longstanding friendship with Martin Sheen, who was cast as President Josiah Bartlet.

When the show premiered, Lowe was considered the lead, and the pilot centered on his character. But as other members of the cast —including Allison Janney, Richard Schiff, Janel Moloney, Dulé Hill, John Spencer, Bradley Whitford, Martin Sheen (who was initially scripted as a small role), and Stockard Channing (whose First Lady was initially scripted as a guest role)— grew more popular, Lowe's character no longer served as the show's main focus. Lowe and series creator Aaron Sorkin soon found themselves at odds over the network's meddling with the show, most notably the network demanding changes in Lowe's character. Eventually, Lowe left the series, not long before Sorkin and director/executive producer Thomas Schlamme resigned over a dispute with NBC.

During the final season of The West Wing, Lowe returned to his role of Sam Seaborn, appearing in two of the final four episodes. In 2011, Lowe stated on The Oprah Winfrey Show that he left the show because he did not feel he was being respected, when the other lead characters received a raise and he did not. After leaving The West Wing, Lowe was the star and executive producer of a failed NBC drama, The Lyon's Den (2003). In 2004, he tried again in a series entitled Dr. Vegas, but it also was quickly canceled. Lowe passed on the role of Derek Shepherd on Grey's Anatomy, which eventually went to Patrick Dempsey, in favor of doing Dr. Vegas.

Despite his two canceled TV series and flops like View From the Top and the made-for-TV movie Perfect Strangers during his post–West Wing run, Lowe found success in the TV miniseries genre. In 2004, Lowe starred in the TNT remake of the Stephen King miniseries Salem's Lot, which was the highest-rated cable program of that summer and the highest ratings TNT original programming had at the time. In 2005, he starred as Lieutenant Daniel Kaffee in Sorkin's London West End production of A Few Good Men, the first time the two had worked together since The West Wing. Although Lowe had expressed unhappiness about his decreased role on that show at the time of his departure, he has now repeatedly said that any animosity between them is over and that he was pleased to be working once more with Sorkin. That same year, Lowe starred in the miniseries Beach Girls on the Lifetime network, based on the Luanne Rice novel of the same name. The series premiere received the highest ratings for a movie premiere in Lifetime history. Later, Lowe filmed his supporting role as a movie agent in the 2006 independent film Thank You for Smoking.

In 2006, he filmed The Perfect Day for TNT, in which he took a pay cut to film in New Orleans in order to help the Hurricane Katrina-ravaged area. That same year, Lowe filmed Stir of Echoes: The Homecoming, the sequel to the 1999 Kevin Bacon thriller Stir of Echoes, and it was announced that Lowe would join the cast of Brothers & Sisters for a guest run of several episodes. In January 2007, ABC announced that Lowe would be staying on Brothers and Sisters as a "special guest star" for the rest of Season 1 after Lowe's initial appearance on the show in November 2006 brought the best ratings and demographic showing for the show since its premiere. Soon after ABC announced an early Season 2 renewal for Brother & Sisters in March 2007, Lowe announced he would be returning for the show's second season. He continued to appear in the series until the end of the 2009–10 season. Then, Lowe announced he would leave, unhappy with the stories and his lack of screen time in the fourth season. In an episode broadcast on May 16, 2010, his character was part of a multi-vehicle crash involving a large truck and was put into a coma. The storyline was wrapped up in the first episode of the fifth season; Lowe did not appear in the episode.

In June 2006, he was the guest host for an episode in the third series of The Friday Night Project for the United Kingdom's Channel 4. Lowe has also appeared in a televised advertisement for 'Visit California' with other celebrities, including Governor Arnold Schwarzenegger. (In the advertisement campaign, he was usually pictured in a white tee-shirt printed with the California state flag.) Lowe had a supporting role in the 2009 movie The Invention of Lying and a leading role in Too Late to Say Goodbye.

=== 2010–2019: Parks and Recreation and other roles ===
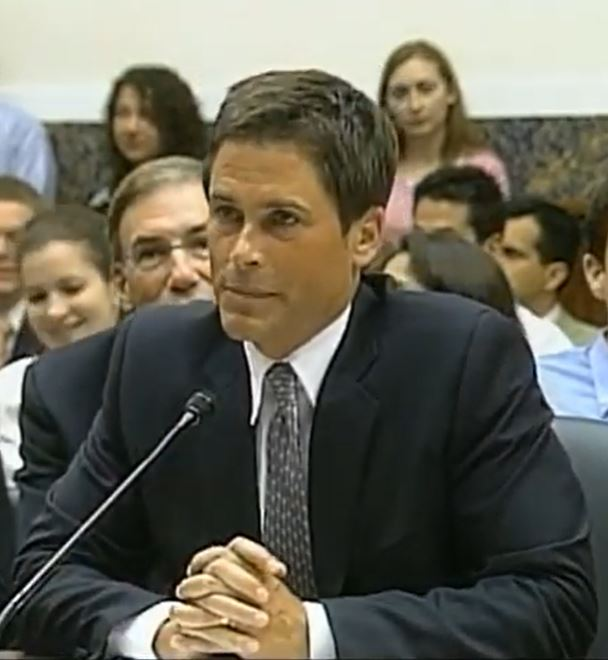
Lowe testifying before the House Select Committee on Energy Independence and Global Warming in 2007

In 2010, he appeared in the biography of the Brat Packers called: Brat Pack: Where Are They Now? He also appeared on The Tonight Show with Conan O'Brien. That same year, he partnered with 44 Blue Productions to develop a reality television pilot titled Potomac Fever, intended to follow the lives of young professionals in Washington, D.C. A pilot was commissioned by the E! network, but the series was not picked up for full production and ultimately did not air. In July 2010, it was announced that Lowe would be providing the voice for the superhero Captain Marvel in the animated series Young Justice. It was also announced in July 2010 that Lowe would become a series regular on the series Parks and Recreation. He portrayed Chris Traeger, the relentlessly upbeat city manager of the fictional town of Pawnee, Indiana, for four seasons, before his character was written out of the show in 2014. He was so pleased with the show and his guest appearances on season 2 that he agreed to become a full-fledged cast member. He reprised the role in the 2015 series finale, "One Last Ride", and in the 2020 special episode "A Parks and Recreation Special".

In 2011, Lowe guest starred in a recurring role on Showtime's comedy Californication. Lowe featured as the troubled but in-demand actor Eddie Nero – a character based upon "about ten people," according to Lowe but somewhat contradicted by sources at Showtime itself – employed to portray Hank in a film version of his book, Fucking and Punching. In 2011, Lowe wrote a memoir titled Stories I Only Tell My Friends, which was released in May 2011. During his promotional tour for Stories I Only Tell My Friends, Lowe told Australian radio show The Kyle & Jackie O Show that during his five-day press visit to Australia in 1990, he was so badly affected by the overuse of painkillers that the only two things he remembers from the trip were being at the Sydney Zoo and getting a tattoo, although he states in his book that he does not remember getting the tattoo. In 2014, Lowe wrote a second book titled Love Life, which was released in April that year. He uses stories and observations from his life in a poignant and humorous series of true tales about men and women, art and commerce, fathers and sons, addiction and recovery, and sex and love.

In 2014, Lowe starred in a pilot for the single-camera comedy The Pro as Ben Bertrahm, a former professional tennis player. The pilot was not picked up for series. He also narrated The '90s: The Last Great Decade? on the National Geographic Channel, which aired in July of that year. In 2015, Lowe starred in the satirical thriller Pocket Listing Lowe has been a commercial spokesman for DirecTV since fall 2014. Commercials featuring Lowe contrast him with some alternate, less appealing form of Lowe, who instead has cable. The advertisements were pulled in April 2015 after the National Advertising Division, acting on a complaint by Comcast, found DirecTV's claims about its customer satisfaction, quality, and ranking to be less than truthful. In February 2015, Fox announced they had greenlit a pilot for the comedy The Grinder starring Lowe and Fred Savage, and directed by Jake Kasdan. The series, in which Lowe starred as a washed-up actor starting a new career as a lawyer, was cancelled after one season. In November 2015, Lowe voiced Simba in the television pilot movie The Lion Guard: Return of the Roar. Lowe continued to voice Simba for its subsequent series The Lion Guard. In December 2015, Lowe was honored with a star on the Hollywood Walk of Fame. His star is located in front of the Musso and Frank Grill on Hollywood Boulevard. In 2015, Lowe launched Profile™, a men's skincare product line. The line features a collection of five antiaging products specially formulated for men. It is currently sold at Nordstrom stores and online. The product collection includes a cleanser, a shave gel, an aftershave serum, a moisturizer, and an eye serum in the price range of $24.50 to $59.50. In 2016, Lowe launched a fragrance product line called 18 Amber Wood with the Profile™ brand.

On August 27, 2016, a Comedy Central Roast TV special was recorded and aired on September 5, 2016, with Rob Lowe as the Roastee and David Spade as Roast Master. Amongst the Roasters were Jewel, Nikki Glaser, Ralph Macchio, Pete Davidson, Peyton Manning, Rob Riggle, Jimmy Carr, Ann Coulter and the "Roast Master General" Jeff Ross. On April 21, 2017, KFC released a campaign featuring Lowe as astronaut Colonel Sanders giving a JFK speech spoof/homage about launching the Zinger chicken sandwich into space. Lowe said in a statement that when he was a child, his grandfather took him to meet Harland Sanders. In late autumn 2017, Lowe began a reality series with his two sons, 24-year-old Matthew and 22-year-old Jon Owen, on A&E titled The Lowe Files. With the exception of the hour-long pilot, the series featured 30-minute road trips with the Lowe boys, and occasional TV guest stars known in the field, investigating common urban myths and legends that Rob has loved since he was a young boy and has shared with his boys throughout their growth. Some of the topics being explored are Bigfoot/Sasquatch, the alleged unidentified "submerged" objects that may have a base off the coast from Los Angeles, alien abduction, and ghosts and their direct responses to stimuli. The series debuted on August 2, 2017, and lasted one season. Lowe has said he hadn't planned on more than one season because of scheduling difficulties.

On January 3, 2018, Atkins Nutritionals announced Lowe as a new brand spokesperson. Due to his "low carb lifestyle," Lowe was selected for a series of multimedia ads that were still appearing in 2024. In October 2018, it was announced that Lowe would star in an ITV series, Wild Bill, about an American policeman who moves to Boston, Lincolnshire, with his daughter. While the show was cancelled by ITV after one season, there were hopes it would be picked up by Netflix or Hulu at a future date. Also in 2018, he made his directorial debut with the television film The Bad Seed, a remake of the 1956 film of the same name. On March 19, 2019, Lowe began hosting the Fox competition series Mental Samurai where he also served as a producer. It lasted two seasons.

=== 2020–present ===
Lowe began hosting a podcast called Literally! With Rob Lowe on June 25, 2020. Guests included Chris Pratt and Conan O'Brien. In September 2021, Lowe launched a second podcast, a Parks and Recreation recap show called Parks and Recollection, alongside Parks and Rec writer and producer Alan Yang. Lowe directed a short documentary, Madness in the Hills, about the mudslides that killed 23 people in Southern California in January 2018, including many friends and neighbors of Lowe. It debuted on the Peacock streaming service on October 9, 2020. On May 12, 2019, it was announced that a spin-off the 9-1-1 series titled 9-1-1: Lone Star was ordered to series with Lowe in the starring role of Owen Strand. The series premiered on January 19, 2020, to generally favorable reviews and was renewed for a second season, which premiered on January 18, 2021. The fifth and final season concluded on February 3, 2025.

In June 2021, as a surprise birthday present to his wife, he fulfilled her dream to be a contestant with him and their children on Celebrity Family Feud. On August 6, 2021, Deadline revealed that Lowe would star and executive produce the Netflix movie Dog Gone. Lowe offered commentary in The Andy Warhol Diaries, premiering on Netflix on March 9, 2022. On April 6, 2022, it was announced that Lowe would star in and executive produce Unstable with Victor Fresco and his son John Owen Lowe for Netflix. The show, which follows Lowe as successful biotech entrepreneur Ellis Dragon as he struggles to deal with his son and regain his footing following the death of his wife, premiered on March 30, 2023.

In January 2024 he began hosting The Floor, a trivia game show. In March 2024 he signed a production deal with Fox following the show's renewal on the network for seasons two and three. In 2024, he appeared in Andrew McCarthy's Hulu documentary about the Brat Pack titled Brats. He said on his podcast in 2025 and in a subsequent magazine article that he declined an unspecified television series because it was going to film in New York, as part of a larger conversation criticizing lack of support for the film industry in Los Angeles and the United States, noting that he filmed The Floor in Dublin.

== Personal life ==
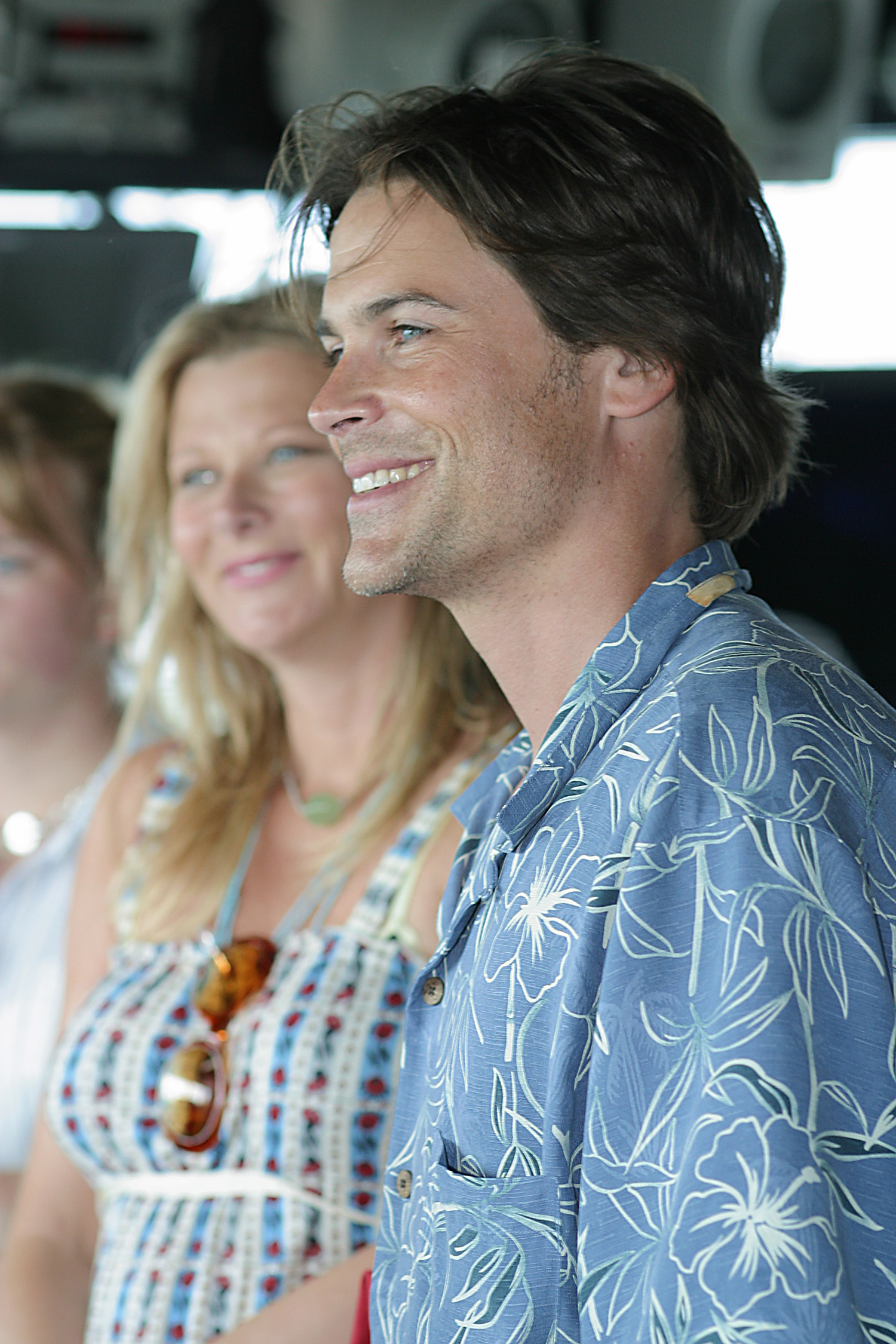
Lowe with wife Sheryl Berkoff in 2003

=== Family and relationships ===
Lowe has been married to former makeup artist Sheryl Berkoff since 1991. She has worked as an interior designer and founder of Sheryl Lowe Jewelry. They met on a blind date in 1983, and again on the set of Lowe's movie Bad Influence. They have two sons: Matthew Edward Lowe (b. 1993) and John Owen Lowe (b. 1995).

Lowe is a fan of the Los Angeles Dodgers and the Los Angeles Rams.

=== Sex tape ===
In 1988, Lowe, who was 24 years old at the time, was involved in a sex scandal over a videotape of him having sex with two women, one of whom was 22 and the other her 16-year-old friend. The three met at Club Rio, an Atlanta nightclub. They were videotaped the night before the 1988 Democratic National Convention in Atlanta, Georgia. As the age of consent in Georgia was 14 at the time (in 1995 it was raised to 16), both were of legal age to engage in sexual activity, but 18 was the legal age to be involved in such a recording. At the time, Lowe was campaigning for Michael Dukakis. The resulting scandal impaired his career, but eventually it rebounded and Lowe mocked his own behavior during two post-scandal appearances as host of Saturday Night Live.

=== Sobriety ===
Lowe began drinking heavily as a teenager. His early fame allowed him to lead a hard-partying lifestyle that was covered extensively in the tabloids. In 1990, two years following the sex tape scandal, Lowe decided to quit drinking and completed an extensive alcohol rehabilitation program. He has maintained sobriety ever since, saying it was the best decision of his life. Adopting a daily Transcendental Meditation practice has been instrumental to his well-being. "It's changed my life," says Lowe.

=== Legal issues ===
In April 2008, Lowe filed separate lawsuits against three former employees, accusing them of breach of contract, defamation, and intentional infliction of emotional distress. Lowe accused an ex‑nanny of engaging in a scheme to hurt him and his wife by spreading "malicious lies." Another former nanny was accused of falsely claiming to have had a personal and intimate relationship with Lowe, and also repeatedly expressing romantic interest in Lowe, claiming Lowe sexually harassed her and that Sheryl Lowe was an abusive employer. Lowe also claimed a former chef engaged in sex on their bed when the family was out of town, stole prescription drugs from the Lowes, broke several security cameras, overcharged them for food, and allegedly made statements to various people that Sheryl was heartless, cold, and unclean.

Jessica Gibson, Lowe's 24-year-old former nanny, made 12 allegations against Lowe involving sexual harassment claims and labor-code violations. On June 19, 2008, Santa Barbara, California, Superior Court Judge Denise de Bellefeuille dismissed two allegations regarding labor-code violations due to lack of legal basis. The legal battle ended in May 2009. The press reported that court records showed that lawsuits filed by both nannies and Lowe were dismissed in Santa Barbara. Attorneys for both women and Lowe sought the dismissals.

== Philanthropy ==
Lowe was the first male spokesman for the 2000 Lee National Denim Day fundraiser, which raises money for breast cancer research and education. His grandmother and great-grandmother both suffered from breast cancer, and his mother died of the disease in late 2003.

Lowe is a founder of the Homeowner's Defense Fund, a Santa Barbara County non-profit, non-partisan organization dedicated to local control of land-use planning and transparency in government. The average price of tract homes in Santa Barbara in early 2006 was US$1,100,000, which motivated some to propose denser housing on existing lots. While in favor of increasing housing density, Lowe sought to build a 14,260-square-foot (1,325 m^{2}) mansion for himself on an empty lot in Montecito, California. His protest over the appearance of the address of the empty lot in the Santa Barbara News-Press precipitated a mass resignation of senior employees at that newspaper on July 6, 2006.

== Filmography ==
=== Film ===
Year	Title	Role	Notes	Ref.
1983	The Outsiders	Sodapop Curtis		
1983	Class	Franklin 'Skip' Burroughs IV		
1984	The Hotel New Hampshire	John Berry		
1984	Oxford Blues	Nick De Angelo		
1985	St. Elmo's Fire	Billy Hicks		
1986	Youngblood	Dean Youngblood		
1986	About Last Night	Danny Martin		
1987	Square Dance	Rory Torrance		
1988	Masquerade	Tim Whalen		
1988	Illegally Yours	Richard Dice		
1990	Bad Influence	Alex		
1991	If The Shoe Fits	Francesco Salvitore		
1991	The Dark Backward	Dirk Delta		
1992	Wayne's World	Benjamin Kane		
1992	The Finest Hour	Lawrence Hammer	Direct-to-video	
1994	Frank and Jesse	Jesse James	Also co-producer	
1995	Tommy Boy	Paul Barish	Uncredited	
1996	First Degree	Det. Rick Mallory	Direct-to-video	
1996	Mulholland Falls	Hoodlum	Uncredited	
1997	Austin Powers: International Man of Mystery	Decapitated henchman's friend	Uncredited cameo	
1997	Living in Peril	Walter Woods	Direct-to-video	
1997	Contact	Richard Rank		
1997	Hostile Intent	Cleary	Direct-to-video	
1998	For Hire	Mitch Lawrence	Direct-to-video	
1998	One Hell of a Guy	Nick	Direct-to-video	
1998	Crazy Six	Billie/Crazy Six	Direct-to-video	
1999	Dead Silent	Kevin Finney	Direct-to-video	
1999	Austin Powers: The Spy Who Shagged Me	Young Number Two		
2000	Escape Under Pressure	John Spencer	Direct-to-video	
2000	The Specials	The Weevil/Tony		
2001	Proximity	William Conroy	Direct-to-video	
2002	Austin Powers in Goldmember	Middle Number Two		
2003	View from the Top	Steve Bench		
2004	Jiminy Glick in Lalawood	Himself	Cameo	
2005	Thank You for Smoking	Jeff Megall		
2009	Majesty	Himself	Cameo	
2009	The Invention of Lying	Brad Kessler		
2011	I Melt with You	Jonathan	Also executive producer	
2011	Breakaway	Coach Dan Winters		
2012	Knife Fight	Paul Turner		
2014	Sex Tape	Hank Rosenbaum		
2014	The Interview	Himself	Uncredited cameo	
2016	Pocket Listing	Frank Hunter		
2016	Monster Trucks	Reece Tenneson		
2017	How to Be a Latin Lover	Rick the Gigolo		
2017	Mune: Guardian of the Moon	Sohone	Voice; English dub	
2018	Super Troopers 2	Guy Le Franc		
2019	Holiday in the Wild	Derek Holliston		
2020	Madness in the Hills	Himself	Short film; also director	
2023	Dog Gone	John Marshall	Also executive producer	
2024	Brats	Himself	Documentary	
2026	The Musical	Principal Brady	Also producer	
2026	Confession	Alexi	Also executive producer	
2026	Rob Lowe: The Outsider	Himself	Documentary	
2026	In a Holidaze	TBA	Also executive producer	
2027	The Third Parent	Cap Hollow	Post-production; also producer	
TBA	My New Friend Jim	TBA	Post-production	
TBA	Untitled Stephen Merchant film	TBA	Post-production	

=== Television ===
Year	Title	Role	Notes	Ref.
1979–1980	A New Kind of Family	Tony Flannagan	10 episodes	
1980–1981	ABC Afterschool Special	Charles Elderberry, Jeff Bartlett	Episode: "Schoolboy Father", "A Matter of Time"	
1983	Thursday's Child	Sam Alden	Television film	
1990–2000	Saturday Night Live	Host	3 episodes	
1990	If the Shoe Fits	Francesco Salvatore	Television film	
1993	Great Performances	Doctor Cukrowicz	Episode: "Suddenly, Last Summer"	
1994	The Stand	Nick Andros	4 episodes	
1995	The Larry Sanders Show	Himself	Episode: "The Bump"	
1996	On Dangerous Ground	Sean Dillon	Television film	
1997	Midnight Man	Sean Dillon	Television film	
1998	Outrage	Tom Casey	Television film	
1998	Stories from My Childhood	Ivan	Voice; Episode: "Ivan and His Magic Pony"	
1999	Atomic Train	John Seger	2 episodes	
1999–2003, 2006	The West Wing	Sam Seaborn	80 episodes	
1999	Winding Roads	Partygoer	Television film	
2001	Jane Doe	David Doe	Television film	
2002	Framed	Det. Mike Santini	Television film	
2002	Founding Brothers	James Madison	Documentary; Voice	
2002	The Christmas Shoes	Robert Layton	Television film	
2003	The Lyon's Den	Jack Turner	13 episodes; also executive producer	
2004	Dr. Vegas	Billy Grant	10 episodes; also executive producer	
2004	Salem's Lot	Ben Mears	2 episodes	
2004	Perfect Strangers	Lloyd Rockwell	Television film	
2005	The Christmas Blessing	Robert Layton	Television film	
2005	Beach Girls	Jack Kilvert	6 episodes	
2006	A Perfect Day	Rob Harlan	Television film	
2006–2010	Brothers & Sisters	Robert McCallister	76 episodes	
2007, 2009	Family Guy	Stanford Cordray, Himself	Voice; 2 episodes	
2007	Stir of Echoes: The Homecoming	Ted Cogan	Television film	
2009	Too Late to Say Goodbye	Bart Corbin	Television film	
2010–2015, 2020	Parks and Recreation	Chris Traeger	77 episodes	
2011	Young Justice	Captain Marvel	Voice; 2 episodes	
2011–2014	Californication	Eddie Nero	6 episodes	
2012	Who Do You Think You Are?	Himself	Season 3 episode 9	
2012	Drew Peterson: Untouchable	Drew Peterson	Television film	
2013	Franklin & Bash	Himself	Episode: "Shoot to Kill"	
2013	Prosecuting Casey Anthony	Jeff Ashton	Also executive producer; Television film	
2013	Behind the Candelabra	Jack Startz	HBO Television film	
2013	Killing Kennedy	John F. Kennedy	Nat Geo Television film	
2014	The Pro	Ben Bertram	Pilot; also executive producer	
2015	Moonbeam City	Dazzle Novak	Voice; 10 episodes; also producer	
2015	You, Me and the Apocalypse	Father Jude Sutton	8 episodes	
2015–2016	The Grinder	Dean Sanderson	22 episodes; also executive producer	
2015	Beautiful & Twisted (Note: Also known as The Novack Murders)	Ben Novack, Jr.	Also executive producer	
2015	The Lion Guard: Return of the Roar	Simba	Voice	
2016	Comedy Central Roast	Himself/Roastee	Television special	
2016–2018	Code Black	Ethan Willis	29 episodes	
2016–2019	The Lion Guard	Simba	Voice; 23 episodes	
2017	The Lowe Files	Himself (host)	9 episodes; also executive producer	
2017	The Orville	Darulio	2 episodes	
2017	The Lion Guard: The Rise of Scar	Simba	Voice; Television Film	
2018	The Bad Seed	David Grossman	Also director and executive producer; Television film	
2019	Wild Bill	Chief Constable Bill Hixon	6 episodes; also executive producer	
2019–2021	Mental Samurai	Himself (host)	19 episodes; also producer	
2020	Jimmy Kimmel Live!	Himself (guest host)	2 episodes	
2020	A West Wing Special to Benefit When We All Vote	Sam Seaborn	Recreation of "Hartsfield's Landing"	
2020–2025	9-1-1: Lone Star	Capt. Owen Strand	72 episodes; also executive producer	
2021	Attack of the Hollywood Cliches!	Himself (host)	Netflix special; also executive producer	
2022	The '80s: Top Ten	Himself (host)	6 episodes; also executive producer	
2022	The Pentaverate	Himself	4 episodes	
2023	The Simpsons	Cousin Peter	Voice; Episode: "The Very Hungry Caterpillars"	
2023–2024	Unstable	Ellis Dragon	16 episodes; also co-creator and executive producer	
2024–present	The Floor	Himself (host)	Also executive producer	

=== Theater ===
Year	Title	Role	Playwright	Venue	Ref.
1987	Three Sisters	Baron Nikolaj Lvovich Tuzenbach	Anton Chekov	Williamstown Theater Festival, Massachusetts	
2005	A Few Good Men	Lt. Daniel Kaffee	Aaron Sorkin	Theatre Royal Haymarket, West End	

=== Music videos ===
Year	Title	Role	Musical Artist	Ref.
1984	"Turn to You"	Man at dance	The Go Gos	
1985	"St. Elmo's Fire (Man in Motion)"	Billy Hicks	John Parr	
1985	"Love Theme from St. Elmo's Fire"	Billy Hicks	David Foster	
2026	"Do Me Right"	Himself	Mr. Fantasy	

=== Video games ===
Year	Title	Role	Notes
1996	Fox Hunt	Edison Pettibone	Live action

== Awards and nominations ==
Organizations	Year	Category	Work	Result	Ref.
Dayton Region Walk of Fame	2025	Inductee	Himself	Honored	(Note: Multiple sources:)
Golden Globe Awards	1983	Best Supporting Actor – Television	Thursday's Child	Nominated	
Golden Globe Awards	1987	Best Supporting Actor – Motion Picture	Square Dance	Nominated	
Golden Globe Awards	1999	Best Actor – Television Series Drama	The West Wing	Nominated	
Golden Globe Awards	2000	Best Actor – Television Series Drama	The West Wing	Nominated	
Golden Globe Awards	2013	Best Supporting Actor – Television	Behind the Candelabra	Nominated	
Golden Globe Awards	2015	Best Actor – Television Series Musical or Comedy	The Grinder	Nominated	
Hollywood Walk of Fame	2015	Inductee	Himself	Honored	
Horatio Alger Association	2018	Horatio Alger Award (Note: The recognizes people who have overcome personal challenges to achieve personal and professional success)	Himself	Honored	
People's Choice Awards	2016	Favorite Actor in a New TV Series	The Grinder	Nominated	
Primetime Emmy Awards	2001	Outstanding Lead Actor in a Drama Series	The West Wing	Nominated	
Razzie Awards	1985	Worst Supporting Actor	St. Elmo's Fire	Won	
Satellite Awards	2000	Best Cast – Television Series	The West Wing	Won	
Savannah College of Art and Design	2024	Honorary Doctorate of Humane Letters	Himself	Honored	
Screen Actors Guild Awards	2000	Outstanding Ensemble in a Drama Series	The West Wing	Won	
Screen Actors Guild Awards	2001	Outstanding Ensemble in a Drama Series	The West Wing	Won	
Screen Actors Guild Awards	2002	Outstanding Ensemble in a Drama Series	The West Wing	Nominated	
Screen Actors Guild Awards	2013	Outstanding Actor in a Miniseries or Television Movie	Killing Kennedy	Nominated	

== Bibliography ==
- Love Life. New York: Simon & Schuster, 2014.
- Stories I Only Tell My Friends: An Autobiography. New York: Henry Holt and Company, 2011.
