= List of awards and nominations received by This Is Us =

The television series This Is Us has won various awards throughout its run.

== Accolades ==
Award	Year	Category	Nominee(s)	Result	Ref.
ACE Eddie Awards	2017	Best Edited One Hour Series for Commercial Television	David L. Bertman (for "Pilot")	Won	
ACE Eddie Awards	2021	Best Edited One Hour Series for Commercial Television	Julia Grove and Lai-San Ho (for "Forty: Part Two")	Won	
African-American Film Critics Association Awards	2016	Top Ten TV Show	This Is Us	Won	
American Film Institute Awards	2016	Top 10 TV Programs of the Year	This Is Us	Won	
American Film Institute Awards	2017	Top 10 TV Programs of the Year	This Is Us	Won	
Artios Awards	2020	Television Series – Drama	Tiffany Little Canfield, Josh Einsohn and Bernie Telsey	Nominated	
Artios Awards	2022	Outstanding Television Series – Drama	Bernard Telsey, Tiffany Little Canfield, Josh Einsohn, Ryan Bernard Tymensky	Nominated	
Black Reel Television Awards	2020	Outstanding Actor, Drama Series	Sterling K. Brown	Won	
Black Reel Television Awards	2020	Outstanding Supporting Actress, Drama Series	Susan Kelechi Watson	Nominated	
Black Reel Television Awards	2020	Outstanding Guest Actor, Drama Series	Asante Blackk	Nominated	
Black Reel Television Awards	2020	Outstanding Guest Actor, Drama Series	Ron Cephas Jones	Nominated	
Black Reel Television Awards	2020	Outstanding Guest Actress, Drama Series	Phylicia Rashad	Nominated	
Black Reel Television Awards	2020	Outstanding Directing, Drama Series	Kevin Hooks (for "A Hell of a Week: Part One")	Nominated	
Black Reel Television Awards	2020	Outstanding Writing, Drama Series	Jon Dorsey (for "A Hell of a Week: Part One")	Won	
Critics' Choice Television Awards	2016	Best Drama Series	This Is Us	Nominated	
Critics' Choice Television Awards	2016	Most Exciting New Series	This Is Us	Won	
Critics' Choice Television Awards	2018	Best Actor in a Drama Series	Sterling K. Brown	Won	
Critics' Choice Television Awards	2018	Best Drama Series	This Is Us	Nominated	
Critics' Choice Television Awards	2018	Best Supporting Actress in a Drama Series	Chrissy Metz	Nominated	
Critics' Choice Television Awards	2019	Best Actor in a Drama Series	Milo Ventimiglia	Nominated	
Critics' Choice Television Awards	2019	Best Supporting Actor in a Drama Series	Justin Hartley	Nominated	
Critics' Choice Television Awards	2020	Best Drama Series	This Is Us	Nominated	
Critics' Choice Television Awards	2020	Best Actor in a Drama Series	Sterling K. Brown	Nominated	
Critics' Choice Television Awards	2020	Best Supporting Actor in a Drama Series	Asante Blackk	Nominated	
Critics' Choice Television Awards	2020	Best Supporting Actor in a Drama Series	Justin Hartley	Nominated	
Critics' Choice Television Awards	2020	Best Supporting Actress in a Drama Series	Susan Kelechi Watson	Nominated	
Critics' Choice Television Awards	2021	Best Drama Series	This Is Us	Nominated	
Critics' Choice Television Awards	2021	Best Actor in a Drama Series	Sterling K. Brown	Nominated	
Critics' Choice Television Awards	2021	Best Supporting Actor in a Drama Series	Justin Hartley	Nominated	
Critics' Choice Television Awards	2022	Best Drama Series	This Is Us	Nominated	
Critics' Choice Television Awards	2022	Best Actor in a Drama Series	Sterling K. Brown	Nominated	
Critics' Choice Television Awards	2022	Best Supporting Actor in a Drama Series	Justin Hartley	Nominated	
Critics' Choice Television Awards	2022	Best Supporting Actress in a Drama Series	Susan Kelechi Watson	Nominated	
Critics' Choice Television Awards	2023	Best Actor in a Drama Series	Sterling K. Brown	Nominated	
Critics' Choice Television Awards	2023	Best Actress in a Drama Series	Mandy Moore	Nominated	
GLAAD Media Awards	2018	Outstanding Drama Series	This is Us	Won	
Golden Globe Awards	2017	Best Supporting Actress – Series, Miniseries or Television Film	Chrissy Metz	Nominated	
Golden Globe Awards	2017	Best Supporting Actress – Series, Miniseries or Television Film	Mandy Moore	Nominated	
Golden Globe Awards	2017	Best Television Series – Drama	This Is Us	Nominated	
Golden Globe Awards	2018	Best Actor – Television Series Drama	Sterling K. Brown	Won	
Golden Globe Awards	2018	Best Supporting Actress – Series, Miniseries or Television Film	Chrissy Metz	Nominated	
Golden Globe Awards	2018	Best Television Series – Drama	This Is Us	Nominated	
Guild of Music Supervisors Awards	2018	Best Music Supervision in a Television Drama	Jennifer Pyken	Nominated	
Guild of Music Supervisors Awards	2018	Best Song/Recording Created for Television	"We Can Always Come Back to This"	Nominated	
Hollywood Music in Media Awards	2017	Outstanding Music Supervision – Television	Jennifer Pyken	Nominated	
Hollywood Critics Association TV Awards	2021	Best Broadcast Network Series, Drama	This Is Us	Nominated	
Hollywood Critics Association TV Awards	2021	Best Actor in a Broadcast Network or Cable Series, Drama	Sterling K. Brown	Nominated	
Hollywood Critics Association TV Awards	2021	Best Actress in a Broadcast Network or Cable Series, Drama	Mandy Moore	Nominated	
Hollywood Critics Association TV Awards	2021	Best Supporting Actress in a Broadcast Network or Cable Series, Drama	Hannah Zeile	Nominated	
Hollywood Critics Association TV Awards	2022	Best Broadcast Network Series, Drama	This Is Us	Won	
Hollywood Critics Association TV Awards	2022	Best Actor in a Broadcast Network or Cable Series, Drama	Milo Ventimiglia	Nominated	
Hollywood Critics Association TV Awards	2022	Best Actor in a Broadcast Network or Cable Series, Drama	Sterling K. Brown	Nominated	
Hollywood Critics Association TV Awards	2022	Best Actress in a Broadcast Network or Cable Series, Drama	Mandy Moore	Nominated	
Hollywood Critics Association TV Awards	2022	Best Supporting Actor in a Broadcast Network or Cable Series, Drama	Jon Huertas	Nominated	
Hollywood Critics Association TV Awards	2022	Best Supporting Actor in a Broadcast Network or Cable Series, Drama	Justin Hartley	Nominated	
Hollywood Critics Association TV Awards	2022	Best Supporting Actress in a Broadcast Network or Cable Series, Drama	Chrissy Metz	Nominated	
Hollywood Critics Association TV Awards	2022	Best Supporting Actress in a Broadcast Network or Cable Series, Drama	Susan Kelechi Watson	Nominated	
Hollywood Critics Association TV Awards	2022	Best Directing in a Broadcast Network or Cable Series, Drama	Milo Ventimiglia (for "Guitar Man")	Nominated	
Hollywood Critics Association TV Awards	2022	Best Directing in a Broadcast Network or Cable Series, Drama	Jon Huertas (for "Four Fathers")	Nominated	
Hollywood Critics Association TV Awards	2022	Best Writing in a Broadcast Network or Cable Series, Drama	Dan Fogelman (for "The Train")	Won	
Hollywood Critics Association TV Awards	2022	Best Writing in a Broadcast Network or Cable Series, Drama	Casey Johnson, David Windsor, & Chrissy Metz (for "The Hill")	Nominated	
Humanitas Prize	2019	60-Minute Drama	Kay Oyegun (for "This Big, Amazing, Beautiful Life")	Nominated	
Make-Up Artists and Hair Stylists Guild Awards	2022	Best Period and/or Character Make-Up	Zoe Hay, Heather Plott, Tania McComas	Nominated	
Make-Up Artists and Hair Stylists Guild Awards	2022	Best Special Make-Up Effects	Zoe Hay, Stephen Bettles, Tania McComas, Elizabeth Hoel-Chang	Nominated	
MTV Movie & TV Awards	2017	Best Actor in a Show	Mandy Moore	Nominated	
MTV Movie & TV Awards	2017	Show of the Year	This Is Us	Nominated	
MTV Movie & TV Awards	2017	Tearjerker	Milo Ventimiglia and Lonnie Chavis (Jack and Randall at Karate)	Won	
MTV Movie & TV Awards	2018	Best Musical Moment	Kate sings "Landslide"	Nominated	
NAACP Image Awards	2017	Outstanding Actor in a Drama Series	Sterling K. Brown	Won	
NAACP Image Awards	2017	Outstanding Drama Series	This Is Us	Nominated	
NAACP Image Awards	2017	Outstanding Performance by a Youth	Lonnie Chavis	Nominated	
NAACP Image Awards	2018	Outstanding Actor in a Drama Series	Sterling K. Brown	Nominated	
NAACP Image Awards	2018	Outstanding Drama Series	This Is Us	Nominated	
NAACP Image Awards	2018	Outstanding Performance by a Youth	Lonnie Chavis	Nominated	
NAACP Image Awards	2018	Outstanding Supporting Actress in a Drama Series	Susan Kelechi Watson	Nominated	
NAACP Image Awards	2018	Outstanding Writing in a Drama Series	Vera Herbert (for "Still Here")	Nominated	
NAACP Image Awards	2021	Outstanding Drama Series	This Is Us	Nominated	
NAACP Image Awards	2021	Outstanding Actor in a Drama Series	Sterling K. Brown	Nominated	
NAACP Image Awards	2021	Outstanding Supporting Actress in a Drama Series	Susan Kelechi Watson	Nominated	
NAACP Image Awards	2021	Outstanding Performance by a Youth	Lyric Ross	Nominated	
NAACP Image Awards	2022	Outstanding Actor in a Drama Series	Sterling K. Brown	Won	
NAACP Image Awards	2022	Outstanding Supporting Actress in a Drama Series	Susan Kelechi Watson	Nominated	
NAACP Image Awards	2022	Outstanding Performance by a Youth	Eris Baker	Nominated	
Peabody Awards	2017	Entertainment and Children's programs	This Is Us	Nominated	
People's Choice Awards	2017	Favorite Actor in a New TV Series	Milo Ventimiglia	Nominated	
People's Choice Awards	2017	Favorite Actress in a New TV Series	Mandy Moore	Nominated	
People's Choice Awards	2017	Favorite New TV Drama	This Is Us	Won	
People's Choice Awards	2018	The Drama Show of 2018	This Is Us	Nominated	
People's Choice Awards	2018	The Drama TV Star of 2018	Justin Hartley	Nominated	
People's Choice Awards	2018	The Drama TV Star of 2018	Chrissy Metz	Nominated	
People's Choice Awards	2018	The Female TV Star of 2018	Mandy Moore	Nominated	
People's Choice Awards	2018	The Male TV Star of 2018	Sterling K. Brown	Nominated	
People's Choice Awards	2018	The Male TV Star of 2018	Milo Ventimiglia	Nominated	
People's Choice Awards	2018	The Show of 2018	This Is Us	Nominated	
People's Choice Awards	2020	The Show of 2020	This Is Us	Nominated	
People's Choice Awards	2020	The Drama Show of 2020	This Is Us	Nominated	
People's Choice Awards	2020	The Male TV Star of 2020	Sterling K. Brown	Won	
People's Choice Awards	2020	The Female TV Star of 2020	Mandy Moore	Nominated	
People's Choice Awards	2020	The Drama TV Star of 2020	Sterling K. Brown	Nominated	
People's Choice Awards	2020	The Drama TV Star of 2020	Mandy Moore	Won	
People's Choice Awards	2021	The Show of 2021	This Is Us	Nominated	
People's Choice Awards	2021	The Drama Show of 2021	This Is Us	Nominated	
People's Choice Awards	2021	The Male TV Star of 2021	Sterling K. Brown	Nominated	
People's Choice Awards	2021	The Female TV Star of 2021	Mandy Moore	Nominated	
People's Choice Awards	2021	The Drama TV Star of 2021	Sterling K. Brown	Nominated	
People's Choice Awards	2021	The Drama TV Star of 2021	Mandy Moore	Nominated	
People's Choice Awards	2022	The Show of 2022	This Is Us	Nominated	
People's Choice Awards	2022	The Drama Show of 2022	This Is Us	Nominated	
People's Choice Awards	2022	The Male TV Star of 2022	Sterling K. Brown	Nominated	
People's Choice Awards	2022	The Female TV Star of 2022	Mandy Moore	Nominated	
People's Choice Awards	2022	The Drama TV Star of 2022	Sterling K. Brown	Nominated	
People's Choice Awards	2022	The Drama TV Star of 2022	Mandy Moore	Nominated	
Primetime Emmy Awards	2017	Outstanding Drama Series	Dan Fogelman, Jess Rosenthal, John Requa, Glenn Ficarra, Ken Olin, Donald Todd, Charles Gogolak, KJ Steinberg, Isaac Aptaker, Elizabeth Berger, Joe Lawson, Steve Beers, Vera Herbert and Bekah Brunstetter	Nominated	
Primetime Emmy Awards	2017	Outstanding Lead Actor in a Drama Series	Sterling K. Brown (for "Memphis")	Won	
Primetime Emmy Awards	2017	Outstanding Lead Actor in a Drama Series	Milo Ventimiglia (for "Moonshadow")	Nominated	
Primetime Emmy Awards	2017	Outstanding Supporting Actor in a Drama Series	Ron Cephas Jones (for "Memphis")	Nominated	
Primetime Emmy Awards	2017	Outstanding Supporting Actress in a Drama Series	Chrissy Metz (for "Pilot")	Nominated	
Primetime Emmy Awards	2018	Outstanding Drama Series	This Is Us	Nominated	
Primetime Emmy Awards	2018	Outstanding Lead Actor in a Drama Series	Sterling K. Brown	Nominated	
Primetime Emmy Awards	2018	Outstanding Lead Actor in a Drama Series	Milo Ventimiglia	Nominated	
Primetime Emmy Awards	2019	Outstanding Drama Series	This Is Us	Nominated	
Primetime Emmy Awards	2019	Outstanding Lead Actor in a Drama Series	Sterling K. Brown	Nominated	
Primetime Emmy Awards	2019	Outstanding Lead Actor in a Drama Series	Milo Ventimiglia	Nominated	
Primetime Emmy Awards	2019	Outstanding Lead Actress in a Drama Series	Mandy Moore	Nominated	
Primetime Emmy Awards	2019	Outstanding Supporting Actor in a Drama Series	Chris Sullivan	Nominated	
Primetime Emmy Awards	2020	Outstanding Lead Actor in a Drama Series	Sterling K. Brown	Nominated	
Primetime Emmy Awards	2021	Outstanding Drama Series	This Is Us	Nominated	
Primetime Emmy Awards	2021	Outstanding Lead Actor in a Drama Series	Sterling K. Brown	Nominated	
Primetime Emmy Awards	2021	Outstanding Supporting Actor in a Drama Series	Chris Sullivan	Nominated	
Primetime Creative Arts Emmy Awards	2017 (Note: In 2017, Hala Bahmet, Marina Ray and Elinor Bardach were nominated for Outstanding Costumes for a Contemporary Series, Limited Series, or Movie. The nomination was rescinded after it was determined that the submitted episode "Moonshadow" was primarily set in the 1970s, violating the TV Academy's rule that "more than 50 percent" of the episode must be contemporary (within 25 years of the air date).)	Outstanding Guest Actor in a Drama Series	Brian Tyree Henry (for "Memphis")	Nominated	
Primetime Creative Arts Emmy Awards	2017	Outstanding Guest Actor in a Drama Series	Gerald McRaney (for "The Big Day")	Won	
Primetime Creative Arts Emmy Awards	2017	Outstanding Guest Actor in a Drama Series	Denis O'Hare (for "Last Christmas")	Nominated	
Primetime Creative Arts Emmy Awards	2017	Outstanding Casting for a Drama Series	Bernard Telsey and Tiffany Little Canfield	Nominated	
Primetime Creative Arts Emmy Awards	2017	Outstanding Makeup for a Single-Camera Series (Non-Prosthetic)	Zoe Hay, Heather Plott, Elizabeth Hoel-Chang, Judith Lynn Staats and John Damiani (for "I Call Marriage")	Nominated	
Primetime Creative Arts Emmy Awards	2018	Outstanding Contemporary Costumes	Hala Bahmet and Elinor Bardach	Nominated	
Primetime Creative Arts Emmy Awards	2018	Outstanding Guest Actor in a Drama Series	Ron Cephas Jones (for "A Father's Advice")	Won	
Primetime Creative Arts Emmy Awards	2018	Outstanding Guest Actor in a Drama Series	Gerald McRaney (for "The Car")	Nominated	
Primetime Creative Arts Emmy Awards	2018	Outstanding Makeup for a Single-Camera Series (Non-Prosthetic)	Zoe Hay, Heather Plott, Luis Garcia, Elizabeth Hoel-Chang and Tania McComas	Nominated	
Primetime Creative Arts Emmy Awards	2018	Outstanding Music Supervision	Jennifer Pyken	Nominated	
Primetime Creative Arts Emmy Awards	2019	Outstanding Guest Actor in a Drama Series	Michael Angarano (for "Songbird Road: Part One")	Nominated	
Primetime Creative Arts Emmy Awards	2019	Outstanding Guest Actor in a Drama Series	Ron Cephas Jones (for "A Philadelphia Story")	Nominated	
Primetime Creative Arts Emmy Awards	2019	Outstanding Guest Actress in a Drama Series	Phylicia Rashad (for "Our Little Island Girl")	Nominated	
Primetime Creative Arts Emmy Awards	2019	Outstanding Music Composition for a Series (Original Dramatic Score)	Siddhartha Khosla (for "Songbird Road: Part One")	Nominated	
Primetime Creative Arts Emmy Awards	2020	Outstanding Guest Actor in a Drama Series	Ron Cephas Jones (for "After the Fire")	Won	
Primetime Creative Arts Emmy Awards	2020	Outstanding Guest Actress in a Drama Series	Phylicia Rashad (for "Flip a Coin")	Nominated	
Primetime Creative Arts Emmy Awards	2020	Outstanding Contemporary Hairstyling	Michael Peter Reitz, Katherine Rees, Germicka Barclay, Renia Green-Edittorio and Corey Hill (for "Strangers: Part Two")	Nominated	
Primetime Creative Arts Emmy Awards	2020	Outstanding Original Music and Lyrics	Siddhartha Khosla and Taylor Goldsmith (for "Strangers")	Nominated	
Primetime Creative Arts Emmy Awards	2021	Outstanding Prosthetic Makeup for a Series, Limited Series, Movie or Special	Stephen Bettles and Elizabeth Hoel-Chang (for "There")	Nominated	
Primetime Creative Arts Emmy Awards	2021	Outstanding Music Composition for a Series (Original Dramatic Score)	Siddhartha Khosla (for "Birth Mother")	Nominated	
Primetime Creative Arts Emmy Awards	2021	Outstanding Guest Actress in a Drama Series	Phylicia Rashad (for "I've Got This")	Nominated	
Primetime Creative Arts Emmy Awards	2022	Outstanding Original Music and Lyrics	Siddhartha Khosla, Music; Taylor Goldsmith, Lyrics (for "The Forever Now" in "Day of the Wedding")	Nominated	
Producers Guild of America Awards	2019	Best Episodic Drama	Dan Fogelman, Isaac Aptaker, Elizabeth Berger, John Requa, Glenn Ficarra, Ken Olin, Charles Gogolak, Jess Rosenthal, Steve Beers, KJ Steinberg, Kevin Falls, Julia Brownell, Vera Herbert, Bekah Brunstetter, Shukree Hassan Tilghman, Cathy Mickel Gibson and Nick Pavonetti	Nominated	
Satellite Awards	2018	Best Drama Series	This Is Us	Nominated	
Satellite Awards	2019	Best Drama Show	This Is Us	Nominated	
Screen Actors Guild Awards	2017	Outstanding Performance by a Male Actor in a Drama Series	Sterling K. Brown	Nominated	
Screen Actors Guild Awards	2018	Outstanding Performance by an Ensemble in a Drama Series	Eris Baker, Alexandra Breckenridge, Sterling K. Brown, Lonnie Chavis, Mackenzie Hancsicsak, Justin Hartley, Faithe Herman, Ron Cephas Jones, Chrissy Metz, Mandy Moore, Chris Sullivan, Milo Ventimiglia, Susan Kelechi Watson and Hannah Zeile	Won	
Screen Actors Guild Awards	2018	Outstanding Performance by a Male Actor in a Drama Series	Sterling K. Brown	Won	
Screen Actors Guild Awards	2019	Outstanding Performance by a Male Actor in a Drama Series	Sterling K. Brown	Nominated	
Screen Actors Guild Awards	2019	Outstanding Performance by an Ensemble in a Drama Series	Eris Baker, Sterling K. Brown, Niles Fitch, Mackenzie Hancsicsak, Justin Hartley, Faithe Herman, Jon Huertas, Melanie Liburd, Chrissy Metz, Mandy Moore, Lyric Ross, Chris Sullivan, Milo Ventimiglia, Susan Kelechi Watson and Hannah Zeile	Won	
Screen Actors Guild Awards	2020	Outstanding Performance by a Male Actor in a Drama Series	Sterling K. Brown	Nominated	
Screen Actors Guild Awards	2021	Outstanding Performance by a Male Actor in a Drama Series	Sterling K. Brown	Nominated	
Seoul International Drama Awards	2017	Best Director	Dan Fogelman	Nominated	
Seoul International Drama Awards	2017	Grand Prize	This Is Us	Won	
Teen Choice Awards	2017	Choice Drama TV Show	This Is Us	Nominated	
Teen Choice Awards	2017	Choice Drama TV Actor	Sterling K. Brown	Nominated	
Teen Choice Awards	2017	Choice Drama TV Actor	Milo Ventimiglia	Nominated	
Teen Choice Awards	2017	Choice Breakout TV Star	Chrissy Metz	Nominated	
Teen Choice Awards	2017	Choice Breakout TV Show	This Is Us	Nominated	
Teen Choice Awards	2018	Choice Drama TV Show	This Is Us	Nominated	
Teen Choice Awards	2018	Choice Drama TV Actor	Sterling K. Brown	Nominated	
Teen Choice Awards	2018	Choice Drama TV Actress	Chrissy Metz	Nominated	
Teen Choice Awards	2018	Choice Breakout TV Star	Lyric Ross	Nominated	
Teen Choice Awards	2019	Choice Drama TV Actor	Justin Hartley	Nominated	
Teen Choice Awards	2019	Choice Drama TV Actor	Sterling K. Brown	Nominated	
Television Critics Association Awards	2017	Individual Achievement in Drama	Sterling K. Brown	Nominated	
Television Critics Association Awards	2017	Outstanding Achievement in Drama	This Is Us	Nominated	
Television Critics Association Awards	2017	Outstanding New Program	This Is Us	Won	
Television Critics Association Awards	2017	Program of the Year	This Is Us	Nominated	
Television Critics Association Awards	2018	Outstanding Achievement in Drama	This Is Us	Nominated	
Television Critics Association Awards	2018	Program of the Year	This Is Us	Nominated	
Television Critics Association Awards	2022	Individual Achievement in Drama	Mandy Moore	Won	
Television Critics Association Awards	2022	Outstanding Achievement in Drama	This Is Us	Nominated	
Writers Guild of America Awards	2017	Episodic Drama	Vera Herbert (for "The Trip")	Won	
Writers Guild of America Awards	2017	New Series	This Is Us	Nominated	
Writers Guild of America Awards	2019	Episodic Drama	Isaac Aptaker & Elizabeth Berger (for "The Car")	Nominated	
Writers Guild of America Awards	2020	Episodic Drama	Eboni Freeman (for "Our Little Island Girl")	Nominated	
Writers Guild of America Awards	2022	Outstanding Television: Episodic Drama	Eboni Freema and Kay Oyegun (for "Birth Mother")	Nominated	
27th Shanghai Television Festival	2021	Best Foreign TV Series	This Is Us (season 5)	Won	
