= This Is Us season 6 =

Season of television series This Is Us

This Is Us
- Season 6
- Starring: Milo Ventimiglia; Mandy Moore; Sterling K. Brown; Chrissy Metz; Justin Hartley; Susan Kelechi Watson; Chris Sullivan; Jon Huertas; Caitlin Thompson; Chris Geere; Niles Fitch; Logan Shroyer; Hannah Zeile; Eris Baker; Faithe Herman; Lyric Ross; Asante Blackk; Griffin Dunne
- No. of episodes: 18

Release
- Original network: NBC
- Original release: January 4 – May 24, 2022

Season chronology
- ← Previous; Season 5

The sixth and final season of the American television series This Is Us continues to follow the lives and connections of the Pearson family across several time periods. The season is produced by Rhode Island Ave. Productions, Zaftig Films, and 20th Television, with Dan Fogelman, Isaac Aptaker, and Elizabeth Berger serving as showrunners.

The series was renewed for a fourth, fifth, and sixth season in May 2019. The season stars an ensemble cast featuring Milo Ventimiglia, Mandy Moore, Sterling K. Brown, Chrissy Metz, Justin Hartley, Susan Kelechi Watson, Chris Sullivan, Jon Huertas, Caitlin Thompson, Chris Geere, Niles Fitch, Logan Shroyer, Hannah Zeile, Eris Baker, Faithe Herman, Lyric Ross, Asante Blackk, and Griffin Dunne. On May 12, 2021, it was announced that the sixth season would be the series' last.

The sixth season premiered on January 4, 2022 and concluded on May 24, 2022. The season consisted of 18 episodes.

== Cast and characters ==
=== Main ===
- Milo Ventimiglia as Jack Pearson
- Mandy Moore as Rebecca Pearson
- Sterling K. Brown as Randall Pearson
  - Niles Fitch as teenage Randall Pearson
  - Lonnie Chavis as young Randall Pearson
- Chrissy Metz as Kate Pearson
  - Hannah Zeile as teenage Kate Pearson
  - Mackenzie Hancsicsak as young Kate Pearson
- Justin Hartley as Kevin Pearson
  - Logan Shroyer as teenage Kevin Pearson
  - Parker Bates as young Kevin Pearson
- Susan Kelechi Watson as Beth Pearson
- Chris Sullivan as Toby Damon
- Jon Huertas as Miguel Rivas
- Caitlin Thompson as Madison Simons
- Chris Geere as Phillip
- Eris Baker as Tess Pearson
- Faithe Herman as Annie Pearson
- Lyric Ross as Deja Pearson
- Asante Blackk as Malik Hodges
- Griffin Dunne as Nicky Pearson

=== Recurring ===
- Jennifer Morrison as Cassidy Sharp
- Blake Stadnik as Jack Damon
- Auden Thornton as Lucy
- Alexandra Breckenridge as Sophie
  - Amanda Leighton as teenage Sophie
- Vanessa Bell Calloway as Edie
- Mike Manning as 'The Manny'
- Caron Coleman as infant Randall
- Rose Landau as infant Kate
- Kaz Womack as infant Kevin
- La Trice Harper as adult Deja
- Iantha Richardson as adult Tess
- Iyana Halley as adult Annie

=== Guest ===
- Ron Cephas Jones as William Hill
- Andrew Santino as Casey
- Tyler Barnhardt as Mike
- Katie Lowes as Arielle

== Episodes ==
No. overall	No. in season	Title	Directed by	Written by	Original release date	Prod. code	U.S. viewers (millions)
89	1	"The Challenger"	Ken Olin	Dan Fogelman	January 4, 2022	6AZC01	5.46
In 1986, the Big Three witness the Challenger disaster in their classroom. Rebecca thinks Randall's compassion will lead him to overinvest in solving others' problems and will cause him pain when he cannot fix them. Kevin seems to be in denial, but climbs into Kate's bed to contemplate their parents' eventual deaths. In the present, it is the Big Three's 41st birthday. At her school, Kate's students serenade her and she witnesses Philip's messy breakup. Toby surprises her by coming home from San Francisco that night. Randall bails out the troubled man who broke into his home, but the man does not show at a shelter where Randall has arranged a bed. Kevin has been co-parenting while living in Madison's garage, but moves to Kate's guest room as Madison and her friend Elijah form a romantic connection. He agrees to play the father in a Manny reboot, in order to have stability in LA. Rebecca has developed brain plaques and is troubled by memory lapses. Nicky, now Rebecca and Miguel's houseguest, constantly talks about his lost love, Sally, who lives nearby. Rebecca announces they will all visit her the next day.
90	2	"One Giant Leap"	Kay Oyegun	Kevin Falls	January 11, 2022	6AZC02	5.01
Without telling her parents, Deja visits Malik at Harvard. He is grateful when she prioritizes his schoolwork before their date night. She tells him she is "ready", and they have sex for the first time. Nicky, Rebecca, and Miguel join Sally and her husband for dinner, as Sally gradually remembers her past with Nicky. They all open up emotionally to each other; Sally confesses she is unhappy in her marriage, and has a heart-to-heart with Rebecca about aging. Miguel reassures Rebecca that he is committed to his vow to be with her "in sickness and in health". Feeling ready to move on, Nicky decides to return to Pennsylvania. Rebecca and Miguel go salsa dancing, a beloved pastime Rebecca gave up after becoming self-conscious. In the future, Nicky's wife arrives at the cabin: Edie, a flight attendant he met on the way home from LA.
91	3	"Four Fathers"	Jon Huertas	Casey Johnson & David Windsor	January 18, 2022	6AZC03	4.91
In the past, Jack takes the young Big Three to their first movie, but Kevin wanders off. Jack feels inadequate when he finds Rebecca claiming Kevin from mall security, having written their phone number in Kevin's shoe. Rebecca reassures Jack that the day is not over, and they enjoy an ice cream party before Jack receives word that his mom died. In the present, Randall teaches Deja to drive and overhears Malik's revealing incoming text. Randall and Beth accept that Deja is growing up; Beth will help her get birth control. Deja objects to Randall's dictate that she stay apart from Malik. Kevin attends a Manny table read and misses Fran's first steps. Needing a confidante, he calls Cassidy. Home for a weekend, Toby's drive to spend time with his children disrupts their nap schedule, so Kate attends a school recital alone. The divorced Philip calls it a "good sign" that she still cares enough to complain. Toby convinces Kate they should buy a smoker grill to help create memories together. In the future, Jack Damon loves to use the smoker, even though his earliest memory involves it and an injury on the day his parents' marriage "blew up".
92	4	"Don't Let Me Keep You"	Jessica Yu	Elan Mastai	January 25, 2022	6AZC04	4.76
As a child, Jack breaks his sled in a fall; Marilyn reassures him she'll hide it from Stanley. A few weeks after Jack convinced Marilyn to leave Stanley, he drives her to Ohio to live with her cousin, Debbie. Jack and Marilyn speak on the phone weekly, somewhat perfunctorily. Marilyn returns to Pittsburgh only once to meet her grandchildren, and is preoccupied by fear of Stanley. In 1986, Jack goes alone to Ohio for Marilyn's funeral. He meets her boyfriend, Mike, and their cat. Jack realizes he knows nothing about Marilyn's life there, and feels at a loss to eulogize her. When Rebecca and the Big Three unexpectedly arrive at the church, Jack thanks the mourners for being the people who gave Marilyn a new home, as his wife and children did for him. The Pearsons bond with Mike and Debbie, and they take the Big Three skating with gear Marilyn set aside for their hoped-for visit. Jack feeds the family tomato soup and hot dogs, Marilyn's comfort meal for him. Jack steps away from the table for a moment, and Rebecca follows; he cries as she holds him.
93	5	"Heart and Soul"	Chris Sullivan	Julia Brownell	February 1, 2022	6AZC05	4.54
In the 1980s, Rebecca teaches Kate to play "Heart and Soul" on the piano. Years after Jack's death, constant companions Rebecca and Miguel attend a speed dating event, where Rebecca sees her acquaintance Matt. Rebecca and Matt enjoy a coffee date, but then Kate calls Rebecca a "slut" and Rebecca slaps her. After hearing Rebecca talking sadly to Miguel, Kate sits beside Rebecca at the piano to play "Heart and Soul". In the present, Rebecca accompanies Kate's students on the piano and Kate treasures their closeness. She tells Rebecca that she and Toby have agreed, due to Rebecca's cognitive decline, she can no longer babysit the children alone. Initially upset, Rebecca later admits she overreacted. Kate regrets the years they lost, and asks Rebecca to teach Jack Jr. the piano, starting with "Heart and Soul". Meanwhile, Kevin and Cassidy visit Nicky and Edie at the construction site. Cassidy tells Kevin to stop being a "wrecking ball" in women's lives. He calls Elijah to advise him about having a good relationship with Madison. Deja and Malik announce their plans for Deja to finish high school early and move to Boston. Randall refuses permission; Beth fears they will lose Deja.
94	6	"Our Little Island Girl: Part Two"	Kevin Hooks	Susan Kelechi Watson & Eboni Freeman	February 22, 2022	6AZC06	4.39
Abraham reminds a young Beth about her special connection to dance. A college-age Beth sees her dance teacher, Vincent, at a restaurant and tells Randall how she felt abandoned by Vincent; she cannot bring herself to tell Vincent. Rebecca invites Matt to Thanksgiving. Miguel badmouths Matt to Rebecca but apologizes; each is awkward about the other dating. Kevin tells Kate that he cheated on Sophie. After he tells Sophie, she leaves Rebecca's house, also angry at Kate for remaining silent. In the present, Kevin tapes the first new Manny episode. Unwilling to side with Kevin over a friend again, Kate persuades Kevin to accept Madison's decision to spend Thanksgiving with the twins and Elijah's family. Elijah declares to Kevin his intention to build a life with Madison. Sophie responds warmly to a text from Kate. Beth mentors dance students she has recruited into a scholarship program. Stacey, a dancer who reminds Beth of herself, falls during a showcase solo. Beth comforts her until she gets back up. Beth calls Vincent and speaks her truth, telling him she will support all of her dancers. In the future, Beth displays mementos of her students, including Stacey, now a Houston Ballet principal dancer.
95	7	"Taboo"	Glenn Steelman	Laura Kenar	March 8, 2022	6AZC07	4.24
In the past, Janet cautions a young Rebecca about her diet on Thanksgiving. An engaged Jack and Rebecca host Thanksgiving for Dave and Janet. Rebecca explodes at a hypercritical Janet, only to lovingly embrace her upon learning that her parents are moving to Connecticut. In 2000, Kate is self-conscious of her weight at Thanksgiving. Rebecca and Miguel's bond, as exemplified by their dominance at Taboo, discomfits everyone else. Kevin harshly warns Miguel against acting on any such feelings. Miguel tells Rebecca he is accepting a job in Houston. Kate comforts a devastated Rebecca. In the present, Rebecca convenes Miguel and her children at Thanksgiving to discuss her end-of-life care. She urges her children to live full lives. She makes clear that Miguel will be in charge of medical decisions. Rebecca designates Kate to fill that role if anything happens to Miguel, later privately affirming their bond. Meanwhile, Toby upsets Kate by obsessing over Jack Jr.'s diet. Kate tells Toby that she does not want to inflict her food-centered shame on their children, and admonishes him for not trusting her to feed their children conscientiously. Kevin involves Miguel in planning the new house.
96	8	"The Guitar Man"	Milo Ventimiglia	Kevin Falls & Jake Schnesel	March 15, 2022	6AZC08	4.18
In 1986, Jack and Rebecca take the triplets to the pool. Kevin, not yet able to swim, wants to dive and touch the floor drain. In 2000, the pool is permanently closing; late Thanksgiving night, Kate and Randall follow a drunk Kevin there. Here, he laments that he has "no foundation" for his future. In the present, a hassled Kevin takes the twins to the cabin, intent on proving himself as a father. Cassidy has hired veterans to build the new house. Kevin, Nicky, Edie, Cassidy, and Cassidy's son Matty enjoy a companionable evening. Cassidy goes out for a late-night drive and is injured in a crash. Kevin stays at the hospital overnight, and in the morning Cassidy tells him about her sleepless nights, feelings that she failed her Afghan sources in light of how the war ended, and suicidal urges; Nicky urges her to see a VA readjustment counselor. Kevin convinces Matty to make a Jackson Pollock-like card for Cassidy, and gives him the guitar he has been teaching himself to play. Cassidy returns to the cabin, and Kevin, inspired by Jack's dream to establish Big Three Homes, suggests employing more veterans to build additional houses. Kevin flies back to L.A. with the twins, now much more at ease.
97	9	"The Hill"	Mandy Moore	Casey Johnson & David Windsor & Chrissy Metz	March 22, 2022	6AZC09	4.45
In 1986, at the pool, Kate refuses to put her face in the water and tells Jack she has no reason to let go of him. In 2000, the Big Three accidentally get locked in at the disused pool. Kate reveals she cannot envision any future for herself. Despite Kevin and Randall's help and encouragement, she cannot climb a fence to get out. In the present, Kate spends a weekend in San Francisco with Toby, while finding she prefers the imagined company of "Old Toby", before he lost weight. Kate is upset to learn Toby turned down a job offer in L.A. She and Toby each admit they are happy with their own lives right now, while Toby points out that Old Toby was dangerously mentally unwell. He declares that their only path forward as a family is to buy a house together in San Francisco. Kate climbs a steep hill and calls Philip to apply for a retiring coworker's job.
98	10	"Every Version of You"	Justin Hartley	Kay Oyegun	March 29, 2022	6AZC10	4.21
In 1986, Randall passes his swimming test at the pool and gets his entire family swimming together. In 2000, a police officer prepares to arrest the Big Three for trespassing, but Randall dissuades him, privately explaining that it could destroy his family after their father's death. In the present, Malik breaks up with Deja. Deja denounces Randall over his interference and runs away to Boston to see Malik. Rebecca joins Randall for his drive to Boston. Randall agrees to Rebecca's request that they spend an extra day together on the road, so emotions can settle. Randall has delayed a meeting with a retiring senator who may endorse Randall to replace him; feeling she is the reason for this, Rebecca explains that she made Kate her executor, so that Randall would not devote himself to her as he did after Jack's death. In Boston, Malik tells Randall he broke up with Deja because the existing arrangement was untenable; Randall suggests the relationship could work out someday. Deja apologizes to Randall and they return home. Randall commits to meeting with the senator. Kevin brings the twins to Madison's house. Kate tells Toby she cannot move to San Francisco as things stand.
99	11	"Saturday in the Park"	Chris Koch	K.J. Steinberg	April 5, 2022	6AZC11	4.74
The night of Jack and Rebecca's tenth wedding anniversary, Kevin and Randall lock their babysitter in a bathroom after she hurts Kate's feelings. Jack is upset, but Rebecca is happy the siblings banded together. In the present, Kate and Toby host Rebecca and Miguel's tenth anniversary barbecue amid their own constant arguments; when the leak in the kitchen ceiling returns and intensifies, Kate and Toby each leave a door unlocked and Jack Jr. leaves the house alone. He safely reaches the park by a memorized route, but falls and cuts his head; Rebecca finds Jack Jr. and he gets stitches. Kevin catches Elijah preparing to propose to Madison; while he struggles with jealousy, Randall counsels him to break his usual pattern, and Kevin accepts his and Madison's new relationship. With Jack safely home, Kate and Toby bitterly argue, each blaming the other for what happened, and accuse one another of improper parenting. Kevin and Randall arrive to defend Kate, and Toby angrily leaves; Kate tells her brothers that she fears her marriage may not survive.
100	12	"Katoby"	Ken Olin	Isaac Aptaker & Elizabeth Berger	April 12, 2022	6AZC12	4.56
After Jack Jr.'s injury, Toby takes a lesser job in Los Angeles and enters couples therapy with Kate, but their marriage breaks down over the next sixteen months; they agree to divorce after realising how much their constant arguments upset Jack Jr. Days before finalizing the divorce, Toby asks to reconcile because they are doing better; Kate refuses, saying they are all happier only because they are divorcing. After signing the papers, Kate tells Toby that "their story" will continue, but he disagrees. Philip takes Kate out for karaoke to cheer her up; later, on their first date, he opens up about how his marriage failed under the stress of infertility, and that his wife was killed by a drunk driver after an argument. Years later, with Toby's tacit acceptance and her children's enthusiastic support, Kate marries Philip; Toby calls Kate right before the wedding to say he now accepts what she told him when they divorced. Over the years, Madison and Elijah have a baby; Kevin dates a series of insubstantial women and encounters Sophie, who is now married to Grant, at Kate’s engagement party; Randall runs for Senate; Toby finds love again; Rebecca's cognitive decline continues. The adult Jack performs at a small venue, happy that Kate, Philip, Toby, and Toby's new partner are there to support him.
101	13	"Day of the Wedding"	James Takata	Jon Dorsey	April 19, 2022	6AZC13	5.09
In 1986, Rebecca adopts Diana, Princess of Wales' short hairstyle to break out of her maternal routine, but is unhappy with it when the Big Three mock her. Jack, after sternly but ineffectively lecturing the kids, shaves his beard in solidarity and takes her out to dinner on a school night. They agree that they can enjoy their routine, but also vary it; with Jack's encouragement, Rebecca performs on the restaurant's piano and sings. In 2026, Kate and Philip marry. Randall, having recently been sworn in as a senator, has spent less time with Rebecca and is shocked by her cognitive decline; she often mistakes Kevin for Jack. When Randall deduces Miguel also has health issues, Miguel admonishes him for not allowing him any time away from his burdens. At the reception, Randall makes a toast celebrating life's journey, and despite a tense moment, Rebecca flawlessly performs her song for Kate and Philip. Madison and Beth, meanwhile, spend the day trying to find out who Kevin slept with the night before, believing it to be either Sophie, Cassidy, or the wedding singer, Arielle.
102	14	"The Night Before the Wedding"	Yasu Tanida	Danielle Bauman	April 26, 2022	6AZC14	4.93
On Valentine's Day, 1986, Sophie is a new student in Kevin's class. He immediately writes her a valentine. The day before Kate and Philip's wedding, Sophie arrives at the venue, her luggage lost. Kevin takes her to find a dress, which she ultimately does from a dry-cleaner's unclaimed rack. Sophie has been working abroad as a traveling nurse while Kevin has continued to grow his nonprofit; she agrees with his assessment that she is happy, and tells him she is now divorced from Grant. That evening, Kevin makes s'mores with his children. Sophie accompanies him to his room. They kiss and begin to undress each other, but Sophie decides to leave, fearing they are regressing into their less-fulfilled past selves. At the bar, Arielle has been writing song lyrics inspired by people-watching. She gives him lines she wrote about him. Kevin helps Cassidy unzip her stuck dress. He questions the nature of their relationship; she is glad of their friendship, and confident they have no romantic future. After the wedding, Rebecca—thinking it is 25 years earlier—advises Sophie that Kevin will mature into a better partner. Kevin shows Sophie that he still has her valentine. They kiss, to the family's applause.
103	15	"Miguel"	Zetna Fuentes	Jonny Gomez	May 3, 2022	6AZC15	4.67
Risto and Beatriz relocate from Puerto Rico to Pennsylvania with their young son Miguel and Beatriz's paraplegic sister Gabi. In adulthood, Miguel faces discrimination but achieves financial success. Risto criticizes Miguel's assimilation, causing a rift. Before Jack and Rebecca marry, Jack spurs her and Miguel to becomes friends. Miguel marries Shelly; they have two children before divorcing. After Jack dies, Miguel moves to Houston to avoid Rebecca. Risto dies; Beatriz reassures Miguel that Risto was proud of him. Miguel admires her devotion to Gabi; Beatriz believes he is capable of such love and will find it someday. Miguel and Rebecca reconnect in 2008. He tells her that after a lifetime of not fitting in, she became home to him. She kisses him and they start a relationship; Rebecca believes Jack would have wanted "his two favorite people" to be happy. Miguel retires and moves in with Rebecca, but Kevin is hostile after hearing they are together. Nevertheless, Rebecca and Miguel get married. In 2026, Miguel is devoted to Rebecca's care, but neglects his own health. The Big Three ask him to accept a full-time in-home aide. Miguel is reluctant, feeling his life has been a series of failures, but agrees after Randall reassures him that he has fulfilled his vows admirably. Rebecca and Miguel depend increasingly on Kevin and a nurse. Kevin reconciles Miguel and his estranged son Andy. Miguel dies and his ashes are scattered in Puerto Rico and by the apple tree he planted with Rebecca, now bearing fruit.
104	16	"Family Meeting"	Chris Koch	Isaac Aptaker & Elizabeth Berger	May 10, 2022	6AZC16	4.80
In the past, Rebecca tends to the Big Three's every need as babies. As they grow older, she adapts to their differences as individuals in order to support them. A week after Miguel dies, Rebecca is often disoriented, looking for him. The Big Three meet to discuss next steps; Kevin wants Rebecca to stay in the house he built for her, while Randall wants her to live with his family in Philadelphia. Philip explores the dynamics of the Big Three and their spouses. Toby reminds Kate that she is solely empowered to make the decision. She insists Randall and Kevin engage more closely with Rebecca and then announces she and Philip will find the best place for Rebecca near them in L.A., so that Randall would not damage his career to care for her. But when Kevin decides to move with Sophie into Rebecca's house, with Madison and Elijah already eager to relocate nearby, and Nicky and Edie living in the original cabin, all agree to the proposed support system. Years pass, a harmonious time for the family as the Big Three tend to an increasingly dependent Rebecca's needs. Kevin calls Randall to inform him that Rebecca is likely near death.
105	17	"The Train"	Ken Olin	Dan Fogelman	May 17, 2022	6AZC17	5.32
In 1998, a hospitalized Jack encourages Kenneth Brooks, a man waiting to hear if his son Marcus will survive car-crash injuries. While Jack suddenly dies, his doctor is saving Marcus's life. Years later, Dr. Marcus Brooks is honored for his contributions to Alzheimer's treatment. In 2032, the Pearsons gather to say goodbye to Rebecca. Beth and Toby thank Rebecca for inspiring their respective parenting. Annie thanks Rebecca for helping her feel important. Deja tells Randall of her pregnancy; Malik, the baby's father, rushes to the house after she texts him the news. Kate, doing education advocacy in England, boards an overnight flight but Rebecca is not expected to survive the night. Randall and Kevin stay with Rebecca overnight, and she is still alive in the morning when Kate arrives. Randall thanks Rebecca for her parenting and tells her to "tell him, 'Hey.'" Rebecca envisions herself aboard a luxury train. Led by William, she encounters Dr. K and Miguel, while hearing her family's goodbyes over a loudspeaker. Unwilling to enter the caboose because she's "waiting for someone", she does so only after Kate's arrival. Inside, she lies down on a bed with Jack beside her, greeting him, "Hey."
106	18	"Us"	Ken Olin	Dan Fogelman	May 24, 2022	6AZC18	6.37
On a Saturday during the Big Three's adolescence, Rebecca recalls her father pushing her in a swing, and swinging her own children; in later years, the Big Three swing their children and Jack Damon swings Hope. The Pearsons watch home movies of the Big Three as toddlers, learning their chant. Kevin and Randall are unhappy with Kate's choice of childish games, but Jack tells the boys Kate is right to savor the present. Jack and Rebecca give pep talks to Randall and Kevin, respectively. Jack teaches his sons how to shave. The family plays Pin the Tail on the Donkey; Kate easily wins by letting her family's voices guide her. In the future, Rebecca's funeral is held. Randall questions the point of life. Deja tells him that her unborn child is a son whom she intends to name William; even though she never met William Hill, she knows him through Randall, and that is how she knows life has meaning. Kate worries she and her brothers will "drift," but they all agree not to, reciting the chant. Randall's future plans include the exploratory phase of a presidential campaign. On the train, Jack assures Rebecca she will still be part of her children's lives.

== Production ==
On May 12, 2019, NBC renewed the series for its fourth, fifth and sixth seasons, at 18 episodes each, for a total of 54 additional episodes. The season was confirmed to be the final season in May 2021. The sixth season featured the directorial debuts of actors Chris Sullivan and Mandy Moore. Cast member Susan Kelechi Watson co-wrote the episode "Our Little Island Girl: Part Two", which focused on her character, Beth. Watson felt that she was writing the end of Beth's emotional arc, and that it was "beautiful" to have that opportunity.

Chavis, Hancsicsak and Bates' scenes for the series finale (their only appearances in the season), and a flashback including Baker and Herman, were filmed during the production of season 3.

== Reception ==
Note: Live+3 day ratings have been stated where Live+7 day ratings are unavailable.

Viewership and ratings per episode of This Is Us season 6
No.	Title	Air date	Rating/share (18–49)	Viewers (millions)	DVR (18–49)	DVR viewers (millions)	Total (18–49)	Total viewers (millions)
1	"The Challenger"	January 4, 2022	1.1	5.46	0.7	2.93	1.7	8.40
2	"One Giant Leap"	January 11, 2022	0.9	5.01	—N/a	—N/a	—N/a	—N/a
3	"Four Fathers"	January 18, 2022	0.8	4.91	0.7	2.68	1.5	7.59
4	"Don't Let Me Keep You"	January 25, 2022	0.8	4.76	0.6	2.71	1.4	7.46
5	"Heart and Soul"	February 1, 2022	0.8	4.54	—N/a	—N/a	—N/a	—N/a
6	"Our Little Island Girl: Part Two"	February 22, 2022	0.7	4.39	0.5	2.40	1.3	6.78
7	"Taboo"	March 8, 2022	0.7	4.24	3.24	0.7	1.4	7.48
8	"The Guitar Man"	March 15, 2022	0.7	4.18	0.7	3.15	1.4	7.33
9	"The Hill"	March 22, 2022	0.8	4.45	0.7	3.10	1.5	7.55
10	"Every Version of You"	March 29, 2022	0.7	4.21	0.7	3.26	1.4	7.47
11	"Saturday in the Park"	April 5, 2022	0.8	4.74	0.6	3.07	1.4	7.81
12	"Katoby"	April 12, 2022	0.8	4.56	0.7	3.21	1.5	7.76
13	"Day of the Wedding"	April 19, 2022	0.9	5.09	0.7	3.38	1.6	8.47
14	"The Night Before the Wedding"	April 26, 2022	0.8	4.93	0.8	3.39	1.6	8.32
15	"Miguel"	May 3, 2022	0.7	4.67	—N/a	—N/a	—N/a	—N/a
16	"Family Meeting"	May 10, 2022	0.8	4.80	—N/a	—N/a	—N/a	—N/a
17	"The Train"	May 17, 2022	1.0	5.32	—N/a	—N/a	—N/a	—N/a
18	"Us"	May 24, 2022	1.3	6.37	—N/a	—N/a	—N/a	—N/a
