= This Is Us season 4 =

Season of television series This Is Us

This Is Us
- Season 4
- Promotional poster
- Starring: Milo Ventimiglia; Mandy Moore; Sterling K. Brown; Chrissy Metz; Justin Hartley; Susan Kelechi Watson; Chris Sullivan; Jon Huertas; Niles Fitch; Logan Shroyer; Hannah Zeile; Mackenzie Hancsicsak; Parker Bates; Lonnie Chavis; Eris Baker; Faithe Herman; Lyric Ross; Griffin Dunne; Asante Blackk
- No. of episodes: 18

Release
- Original network: NBC
- Original release: September 24, 2019 – March 24, 2020

Season chronology
- ← Previous; Season 3 Next → Season 5

The fourth season of the American television series This Is Us continues to follow the lives and connections of the Pearson family across several time periods. The season is produced by Rhode Island Ave. Productions, Zaftig Films, and 20th Century Fox Television, with Dan Fogelman, Isaac Aptaker, and Elizabeth Berger serving as showrunners.

The series was renewed for a fourth, fifth, and sixth season in May 2019, with production for season four beginning that July. The season stars an ensemble cast featuring Milo Ventimiglia, Mandy Moore, Sterling K. Brown, Chrissy Metz, Justin Hartley, Susan Kelechi Watson, Chris Sullivan, Jon Huertas, Niles Fitch, Logan Shroyer, Hannah Zeile, Mackenzie Hancsicsak, Parker Bates, Eris Baker, Faithe Herman, Lonnie Chavis, Lyric Ross, Asante Blackk and Griffin Dunne.

The fourth season premiered on September 24, 2019 and concluded on March 24, 2020. The season consisted of 18 episodes.

This was the first season not to be nominated for a Primetime Emmy Award for Outstanding Drama Series.

== Cast and characters ==
=== Main ===
- Milo Ventimiglia as Jack Pearson
- Mandy Moore as Rebecca Pearson
- Sterling K. Brown as Randall Pearson
  - Niles Fitch as teenage Randall Pearson
  - Lonnie Chavis as young Randall Pearson
- Chrissy Metz as Kate Pearson
  - Hannah Zeile as teenage Kate Pearson
  - Mackenzie Hancsicsak as young Kate Pearson
- Justin Hartley as Kevin Pearson
  - Logan Shroyer as teenage Kevin Pearson
  - Parker Bates as young Kevin Pearson
- Susan Kelechi Watson as Beth Pearson
- Chris Sullivan as Toby Damon
- Jon Huertas as Miguel Rivas
- Eris Baker as Tess Pearson
- Faithe Herman as Annie Pearson
- Lyric Ross as Deja Andrews
- Griffin Dunne as Nicholas "Nicky" Pearson
- Asante Blackk as Malik Hodges

=== Recurring ===
- Jennifer Morrison as Cassidy Sharp
- Tim Matheson as Dave Malone
- Timothy Omundson as Gregory
- Brandon Scott as Cory Lawrence
- Tim Jo as Jae-Won Yoo
- Austin Abrams as Marc

=== Guest ===
- Marsha Stephanie Blake as Kelly Hodges, Malik's mother
- Omar Epps as Darnell Hodges, Malik's father
- M. Night Shyamalan as himself
- Auden Thornton as Lucy
- Nick Wechsler as Ryan Sharp, Cassidy's husband
- Ron Cephas Jones as William H. "Shakespeare" Hill
- Phylicia Rashad as Carol Clarke
- Elizabeth Perkins as Janet Malone
- Caitlin Thompson as Madison
- Blake Stadnik as Adult Jack Damon
- Sophia Bush as Lizzy
- John Legend as himself
- Pamela Adlon as Dr. Leigh, Randall’s therapist.
- Adelaide Kane as Adult Hailey Damon
- Alexandra Breckenridge as Sophie
- Maryam Myika Day as Dr. Meyer

== Episodes ==
No. overall	No. in season	Title	Directed by	Written by	Original release date	Prod. code	U.S. viewers (millions)
55	1	"Strangers"	Ken Olin	Dan Fogelman	September 24, 2019	4AZC01	7.88
After returning from Los Angeles, Rebecca marvels at how important a stranger can become. Jack meets Miguel, a store clerk who lends him a sports coat for meeting Rebecca's parents. Rebecca's father Dave tells Jack that he isn't good enough for Rebecca. Marine NCO Cassidy Sharp returns home, experiencing alcoholism and PTSD; her husband Ryan kicks her out after she strikes their son. A drunk Nicky vandalizes the VA during Cassidy's support group, and contacts Kevin for bail money. Teenager Malik is raising a daughter, Janelle. He works in his father's auto garage, but considers illegal activity to better provide for Janelle; his father Darnell explains that taking responsibility for Malik lifted him above that lifestyle. At a barbecue, Malik meets new arrival Deja; both are smitten. A young blind musician meets a waitress, Lucy, and writes a song about a stranger becoming beloved. They get engaged and she opens a restaurant. She learns she is pregnant and fears it is too early in her career, but he reassures her and performs the song at an arena concert. He is Kate and Toby's son, Jack Damon; at three months, he is diagnosed with permanent vision loss.
56	2	"The Pool: Part Two"	Chris Koch	Isaac Aptaker & Elizabeth Berger	October 1, 2019	4AZC02	7.44
Jack and Rebecca take the young Big Three to the pool. Kevin hurts Randall by mocking him in front of his friends, leading Kevin to question if he is a good person; Jack reassures him that only a good person would care. Two popular girls convince Kate a popular boy will kiss her. When instead Stuart—an unpopular boy who actually likes Kate—arrives, she kisses him. After avoiding their parents all day, the Big Three sit quietly with them. In the present, Tess gets a new, short haircut and Beth accepts that Tess is growing up. Deja wants to travel to school via a city bus that passes Malik's garage. Randall thinks public transportation is too dangerous, but ultimately grants permission. Randall teaches the girls to play "Worst Case Scenario" and the family runs up the Rocky Steps. A consultant advises Kate on caring for Jack; Kate commits to Jack living a life without limits. Toby secretly exercises at a gym. Kate helps Kevin and Jack bond, and encourages Kevin to take a job in Chicago. He instead visits Nicky and gives him the ficus he has cared for in recovery.
57	3	"Unhinged"	Anne Fletcher	Vera Herbert	October 8, 2019	4AZC03	7.25
Starting junior high, Randall suffers his first panic attack upon receiving a dress code violation. Kevin forges Rebecca's signature on the slip and convinces the family to watch Arsenio Hall together to remedy Randall's pop culture deficit. Jack makes a mistake at work; Miguel saves Jack’s job by threatening to quit, and Jack pledges to support Miguel whenever needed. In the present, Nicky suffers a setback when his VA therapist is transferred, leading to his vandalism; Nicky may avoid jail time by continuing therapy. Kevin bonds with Cassidy's son Matty in the waiting room. Kevin meets Cassidy when taking Nicky to an AA meeting. Kate is stunned but ultimately supportive of Toby's fitness. Her new neighbor Gregory's seemingly unreasonable demand about where Toby parks his car is actually critical for Gregory's post-stroke recovery; Kate joins Gregory for a walk. Randall prioritizes his constituents over socializing with other officials. His experienced assistant advises him to fire Jae-won; instead, Randall fires her, embracing his and Jae-won's outsider status. Malik tells Deja about Janelle; Deja confides this to Tess, then Tess admits her unexpected lack of confidence in being “out” at her new school.
58	4	"Flip a Coin"	Chris Koch	Julia Brownell	October 15, 2019	4AZC04	6.72
After Randall and Beth's first date, Rebecca and Carol visit campus and discuss widowhood. Carol believes Randall is too "broken" in grief to support Beth, but Beth recognizes Randall's meaningful attention to her and kisses him. Marc, a flirtatious record store employee, hires eighteen-year-old Kate. Rebecca decides to find a permanent home. Via answering machine, Kevin reveals he has married Sophie. In the present, the noise of a baby music class frightens and upsets Jack. Kate and Toby take Jack to the beach to learn new sounds. A possum corpse inside Beth's dance studio building threatens her grand opening; Randall restages the event outside. Carol tells Randall she failed to predict the strong family man he would become. Randall and Beth disapprove of Malik because he has a daughter. The Manny is cancelled. While filming the pilot, Kevin considered quitting acting, but saved the show by soothing his baby scene partner. When an AA meeting is rescheduled, Kevin and Nicky spend the day with Cassidy. Kevin gets Cassidy to acknowledge she wants to save her marriage. Nicky declines Kevin's offer of a new trailer, but Kevin buys one and becomes Nicky's neighbor.
59	5	"Storybook Love"	Milo Ventimiglia	Casey Johnson & David Windsor	October 22, 2019	4AZC05	7.06
Randall, Beth, and Miguel join newlyweds Kevin and Sophie for dinner at Rebecca and Kate's new house. Marc arrives and introduces himself as Kate's boyfriend; her brothers dislike him. Rebecca cooks an inedible dinner and frets over her children's bickering; Miguel suggests that, like a vintner, she wait out the bad years. Rebecca relates the story of her and Jack's similarly disastrous first dinner in their house, then orders pizza and plays the piano as the family takes Polaroids. In the present, Tess has a panic attack; she and Randall are both upset to have this in common, until Beth shares that William also struggled with anxiety. Cassidy is among local veterans honored at a hockey game. Ryan attends, but ignores the ceremony and leaves early; he tells Kevin that the military "broke" his wife and to stay away from her. The crowd triggers Nicky, who leaves but remains sober. Nicky and Kevin share ice cream in a Pearson family ritual. Randall and Kevin send the old piano to Kate as a baby gift. She finds the photos and the sight of Marc gives her pause; she and Rebecca allude to an unspecified issue involving him.
60	6	"The Club"	Jessica Yu	Kevin Falls	October 29, 2019	4AZC06	6.78
Dave takes Jack golfing at his country club; blue-collar Jack feels uncomfortable and drinks heavily. Dave and Jack share competing visions for Rebecca's future. Young Randall idolizes his black teacher, Mr. Lawrence. After Randall expresses interest in Tiger Woods, Jack takes Randall golfing and relates his experience. Randall notes he would not have been allowed at Dave's club. Jack impresses upon Randall the social importance of golf, and Randall plays regularly. Jack invites Lawrence and his wife to dinner, and asks Lawrence to appraise him of Randall's concerns. In the present, Randall invites Wilkins and two other council members to golf at an exclusive club. Feigning ineptitude, Randall puts Wilkins at ease and builds rapport with the others, gaining consideration for his ideas. Toby experiences impotence. Kate asks if he still finds her attractive; he does, but has anxiety over her reservations towards his weight loss. She expresses wholehearted support, reigniting their passion. Kevin and Cassidy work out together. Kevin has an enjoyable date with a gym employee, but cuts it short to comfort Cassidy, who has fought with Ryan. She kisses him; he reciprocates and they have sex.
61	7	"The Dinner and the Date"	Ken Olin	Kay Oyegun	November 5, 2019	4AZC07	6.72
Jack, Rebecca, and the young Big Three host Mr. and Mrs. Lawrence for dinner. The interactions between Jack and Lawrence are awkward, but both men are guided by their wives; Rebecca tells Jack that Randall would never choose anyone over him and that Lawrence's mentorship could help Randall, while Lawrence's wife restrains him from overstepping with his enthusiasm for spending time with Randall. Lawrence had planned to gift Randall a copy of Langston Hughes's Weary Blues, but instead gives it to Jack. In the present, Deja accepts Malik's invitation to skip school for a personalized tour of Philadelphia. Deja is conflicted by her feelings for Malik and worries about his past; he tells her that he values long-term relationships and will be honest with her, and they share their first kiss. Deja is grounded, and in an attempt to divide the two, Randall and Beth invite Malik's family to dinner. The adults clash, and Darnell asks Randall to see beyond Malik's mistakes. Deja apologizes for skipping school, but says she had the best day of her life with Malik and that he makes her "feel like herself." Randall and Beth relax Deja's punishment and allow Deja to see Malik with parental supervision.
62	8	"Sorry"	Rebecca Asher	Elan Mastai	November 12, 2019	4AZC08	7.10
After Jack's death, Rebecca decides to enter the workforce; she is hired after Randall advocates for her with an interviewer. Randall admits that doing his laundry at home is an excuse to spend time with Rebecca. In the present, the day before Thanksgiving, Randall is troubled by Rebecca's fixation on her phone and a series of "senior moments." Rebecca is defensive when he suggests she see a doctor, and Randall indirectly criticizes Rebecca's parenting. Malik tells Beth that Deja wants to see Shauna, and calls out Beth's equivocation; Beth agrees to Deja's request to invite Shauna for Thanksgiving. Toby hopes to feed Jack his first solid food; Kate doesn't tell Toby that Gregory has fed Jack an avocado. Kevin and Cassidy avoid each other, but attend Nicky's hearing together after Nicky seeks Cassidy's help with an erratic but sober Kevin. Nicky expresses gratitude for receiving treatment and having Kevin in his life, and the pretrial diversion is approved. With Kevin's encouragement, Cassidy joins her husband and son at a restaurant and does not deliver her signed divorce papers. Throughout the day, Nicky engages Kevin in honest discussions about Kevin's choices, and Kevin perceives Nicky as Jack.
63	9	"So Long, Marianne"	Ken Olin	K.J. Steinberg	November 19, 2019	4AZC09	7.30
In 1969, Jack and Nicky ditch their bickering parents on Thanksgiving to spend the day together. Nicky buys a five-pound shrimp tower and analyzes the song "So Long, Marianne". They agree to spend every Thanksgiving this way, but Nicky is drafted a week later. In the present, Shauna is thriving, but Deja is upset that Shauna wasn't like that for her. Beth reminds Deja that she had "perfect" moments with Shauna. Kevin helps Tess gain the confidence to come out on Instagram. Nicky cries when Randall plays So Long, Marianne and Randall relates Jack's interpretation—Nicky's own, verbatim. Nicky serves the family five pounds of shrimp, a tradition adult Jack Damon preserves in the future. Nicky suggests Kevin not return to Bradford with him, but affirms his gratitude. Upset with Randall, Rebecca leaves to see a movie before dinner. She mistakes a stranger for William, and loses track of time and her objectives, leading police to escort her home. However, this takes place on August 31, 2020, when Kevin has an unseen, pregnant fiancée, and Kevin and Randall are estranged. In 2019, Rebecca returns and admits to Randall she forgot what movie she was about to see. She agrees to see a doctor.
64	10	"Light and Shadows"	Yasu Tanida	Eboni Freeman	January 14, 2020	4AZC10	6.71
Reacting to Dave's disapproval, Jack breaks up with Rebecca, saying he can't provide for her. Accepting that Rebecca loves Jack, Janet explains Dave's interference; Janet tells Rebecca that if she chooses Jack, she must make sure their love story is great. Rebecca goes to Jack's auto shop and tells him she loves him, which he reciprocates. In the present, Kate throws a birthday party for Toby and learns he secretly changed gyms after a female workout buddy tried to kiss him. Toby admits he is withdrawing from the family, not because his feelings for Kate have changed, but because Jack's blindness makes him sad. Realizing that Jack is reacting to light and shadow, Toby begins to bond with Jack. After unsuccessful matchmaking attempts, Kevin spends a romantic day with a woman, Lizzy, but they part after she admits she is married and he is her celebrity "hall pass." Filming reshoots, Kevin misses a call from Sophie. Miguel bristles at Randall's involvement in Rebecca's medical appointment. After Rebecca is diagnosed with mild cognitive impairment, Miguel admits to Randall that he has been in denial about Rebecca's mental state. Returning home to his family, Randall finds a man trespassing inside his home.
65	11	"A Hell of a Week: Part One"	Kevin Hooks	Jon Dorsey	January 21, 2020	4AZC11	6.59
As toddlers, the Big Three sleep in beds for the first time and Randall is scared of monsters; Jack sleeps beside him and asks him to be his typical stable self. Randall goes to sleep, only for Kevin to get up and complain to Jack that he can't sleep. In college, Randall has high-stress nightmares that frighten him. Beth comforts him and suggests he attend a grief group; Randall agrees to go before Rebecca's birthday dinner, but cancels when Kevin informs him of an emergency involving Kate. In the present, Randall offers the intruder money; he takes it and flees. Randall and Beth later realize the man had already been in their bedroom while Beth slept. The nightmares return and Randall obsesses over his new home security system, but he still manages to defend his support for Wilkins' housing bill at a town hall. Darnell suggests Randall see a therapist, but he declines. Randall saves a woman from a man assaulting her and is hailed as a hero, but he has a breakdown, calling Kevin in tears to admit he needs help. Kevin, with a woman in bed next to him after attending Sophie's mother's funeral, promises to support Randall.
66	12	"A Hell of a Week: Part Two"	Kevin Hooks	Danielle Bauman	January 28, 2020	4AZC12	6.42
Toddler Kevin misses a mobile Rebecca donated to Goodwill. Jack tells Kevin that, after losing something he loves, he can find something else to love. As a teenager, Kevin is close with Sophie's mother Claire. The night of the house fire, a projector malfunction prevents Kevin and Sophie from seeing the end of Good Will Hunting; they leave it unwatched and entertain each other with invented endings. After they marry, Kevin asks Claire for her mother's ring, but Claire tells him they have not yet earned it. Rebecca cancels her birthday dinner to help Kate, who calls from the cabin after leaving with Marc. In the present, Kevin attends Claire's funeral. Kevin supports Sophie, sharing the loss of a parent, and reassures her that memories of Claire will eventually feel normal. They finally watch how Good Will Hunting ends. Back in LA, Kevin finds that Kate and her family are out, and a recently dumped Madison is house-sitting to walk Audio. Kevin praises Madison for fighting for relationships, and they sleep together. When Randall calls, Kevin suggests they and Kate visit the cabin. Kate reports that her marriage is "imploding".
67	13	"A Hell of a Week: Part Three"	Justin Hartley	Laura Kenar	February 11, 2020	4AZC13	6.40
Toddler Kate wants a "Mommy story." With Rebecca asleep, Jack suggests Kate tell the story, in which she searches for her mother. Teenage Kate struggles to accommodate Marc's moodiness. Rebecca asks to get to know Marc better, which Kate perceives as disapproval of the relationship. Kate decides to skip Rebecca's birthday dinner to write music with Marc at the cabin. Marc quits the record store and expects Kate to quit in solidarity; when she declines, he drives recklessly and kicks Kate out of the car amid insults. Kate calls Rebecca, but says everything is fine after Marc approaches with an apology. Rebecca, convinced there is a problem, heads for the cabin with her sons. In the present, Kate has arranged to attend a retreat for blind children and their families. Toby is reluctant to participate, so Rebecca joins Kate and Jack instead. Kate tells Rebecca about Toby's misgivings, and Rebecca confides her diagnosis. They sing karaoke together and embrace the fact they are becoming friends. On Rebecca's advice, Kate demands to know if Toby can be the father their family needs. After Kate is invited to the cabin, Toby offers to care for Jack.
68	14	"The Cabin"	Catherine Hardwicke	Isaac Aptaker & Elizabeth Berger	February 18, 2020	4AZC14	6.46
Jack asks the young Big Three to participate in burying a time capsule at the cabin. Randall panics over what to contribute, and Kevin gives him one piece of a family photo jigsaw puzzle to include. Jack sketches a larger house he wants to build on the property. Marc locks teenage Kate out of the cabin in a snowstorm after verbally and emotionally abusing her. Kept away until the next morning by the storm, Rebecca arrives with Kevin and Randall; they quickly find out that Kate broke back into the cabin through a window. Rebecca banishes Marc from the cabin and from Kate's life. In the present, the siblings meet at the cabin. Tensions rise when Kate learns Kevin and Madison slept together, and Kevin learns of Rebecca's diagnosis. They dig up the time capsule; Rebecca included Jack's sketch, which she retrieved after Jack discarded it, while Jack included an audio cassette expressing his love for the family. Kevin advises Randall to consider Beth's suggestion that he see a therapist. In LA, Toby saves Jack from choking and begins sharing the sound design and dialogue of Star Wars with him. Older Kevin's house actualizes Jack's sketch, built overlooking the cabin.
69	15	"Clouds"	Sarah Boyd	Kevin Falls & Jonny Gomez	February 25, 2020	4AZC15	6.98
Young Randall obsesses over an A-minus until Jack takes him running. Jack consoles Kate over Stuart ending their relationship, advising that one's first boyfriend is unimportant. Kevin receives two A's in nonacademic electives, nevertheless earning a promised $10 reward from Rebecca. He buys baseball cards, hoping for a '91 John Candelaria, finding one after Rebecca indulges his ritual. In the present, Kevin and Rebecca openly discuss her diagnosis. They spend the day together, sneaking onto the grounds of Joni Mitchell's old house after Rebecca recounts being unable to find the site with Jack years earlier. Rebecca wants to continue their fun day rather than learn her MRI results, but Kevin promises that they have tomorrow. The results suggest Alzheimer's. Kevin buys a Candelaria card for $2. Kate resists Toby's gesture of converting the garage into a music studio, until Madison advises she accept Toby's feelings. Toby reveals the studio is intended for Jack, too; Jack grows up creating music in the space. Randall attends therapy but leaves abruptly. Beth tells him that right now he isn't strong enough for her to rely on, but she needs him to be. He returns to the therapist and apologizes.
70	16	"New York, New York, New York"	Ken Olin	Julia Brownell	March 10, 2020	4AZC16	5.62
Jack and Rebecca take the young Big Three to New York City, where Rebecca has fond childhood memories. Jack gets them lost and feels unable to match Dave's leadership, but Rebecca reassures him. After Rebecca fails to reach the Metropolitan Museum of Art before it closes, Jack takes the family for a hansom cab ride. After Kate and Marc's breakup, Rebecca attends Kevin's acting showcase in the city. Kevin introduces Rebecca to his teacher, Kirby; Rebecca allows Kirby to escort her to the Met, but instead returns alone to her hotel after Kirby ridicules hansom cabs. In the present, Rebecca walks the red carpet at Kevin's movie premiere. Kevin and Randall argue after Randall presents Rebecca with information about a clinical trial in St. Louis, despite agreeing to Kevin's request that he wait until the next day. They find Rebecca at the Met, examining a painting that, to her fascination in childhood, captivated a woman patron for hours. Rebecca decides not to enter the trial, instead wishing to fill her remaining time with new experiences. Randall blames Kevin for ruining Rebecca's chance at treatment, and admits he has always wondered if he could have saved Jack from the fire.
71	17	"After the Fire"	Roxann Dawson	Vera Herbert & Kay Oyegun	March 17, 2020	4AZC17	7.07
In therapy, Randall imagines saving Jack from the fire by demanding he not go back inside for Louie. This brush with mortality leads Rebecca to confess to Jack about knowing William, who becomes part of their lives; Randall attends Carnegie Mellon to stay closer to him, meeting and marrying Beth. With familial support, William's cancer and Rebecca's dementia are caught early. Dr. Leigh challenges Randall's suggestion that he could solve everyone's problems while somehow having the same wife and children, and instructs him to imagine a worst-case scenario. William rejects contact with Randall, who leaves for Howard early and later becomes a professor there. He indifferently disposes of William's belongings after his death. He is estranged from his parents and siblings and casually dates a series of women, only reconciling with Rebecca upon learning of her illness. Dr. Leigh notes that Rebecca's confession leads off both scenarios, and suggests he has not truly processed her deception. Randall calls Rebecca and, citing his life as a "good son" who has already lost three parents, implores her to enter the clinical trial; she agrees.
72	18	"Strangers: Part Two"	Ken Olin	Dan Fogelman	March 24, 2020	4AZC18	7.96
On the Big Three's first birthday, Rebecca grieves Kyle. She and Jack visit Dr. K., who describes the coexistence of joy and sorrow. In the present, the Pearsons gather to celebrate Jack's first birthday. Rebecca announces her new decision to do the clinical trial; Kevin deduces Randall's involvement. New character Eli has trouble taming a horse at his ranch, but his young daughter Sadie easily does so. Eli then goes to work; he is an OB/GYN treating Madison. She hasn't told the father, but Eli echoes Sadie's words and advises her to tell him. Madison arrives at Kate's house as Kevin and Randall exchange deeply hurtful insults. Madison tells Kevin she is pregnant with twins, and he commits to fatherhood. Toby and Kate visit the NICU where Jack was born, and decide to adopt a sibling for Jack. New character Hailey works in an art gallery. She turns down her friend and coworker Zach for a date. An electronic notification sends her rushing to the hospital. In the future, older Kevin hugs his son and daughter, and is companionable with Randall. Years later, Jack and Lucy welcome their daughter Hope. Hailey arrives to celebrate; she is Jack's sister.

== Production ==
=== Development ===
On May 12, 2019, NBC renewed the series for a fourth, fifth and sixth season of 18 episodes each, for a total of 54 additional episodes. Dan Fogelman, Isaac Aptaker, and Elizabeth Berger serve as the season's showrunners.

=== Filming ===
Production on the season officially began on July 9, 2019, in Los Angeles.

== Reception ==
=== Ratings ===
Viewership and ratings per episode of This Is Us season 4
No.	Title	Air date	Rating/share (18–49)	Viewers (millions)	DVR (18–49)	DVR viewers (millions)	Total (18–49)	Total viewers (millions)
1	"Strangers"	September 24, 2019	1.8/9	7.88	1.5	5.13	3.3	13.03
2	"The Pool: Part Two"	October 1, 2019	1.7/8	7.44	1.4	4.58	3.1	12.03
3	"Unhinged"	October 8, 2019	1.6/8	7.25	1.5	4.67	3.1	11.94
4	"Flip a Coin"	October 15, 2019	1.5/7	6.72	1.6	4.76	3.1	11.48
5	"Storybook Love"	October 22, 2019	1.6/7	7.06	1.5	4.73	3.1	11.79
6	"The Club"	October 29, 2019	1.4/6	6.78	1.4	4.49	2.8	11.27
7	"The Dinner and the Date"	November 5, 2019	1.3/6	6.72	1.5	4.70	2.8	11.42
8	"Sorry"	November 12, 2019	1.4/6	7.10	1.5	4.66	2.9	11.76
9	"So Long, Marianne"	November 19, 2019	1.5/7	7.30	1.4	4.58	2.9	11.88
10	"Light and Shadows"	January 14, 2020	1.5/7	6.71	1.4	4.68	2.9	11.40
11	"A Hell of a Week: Part One"	January 21, 2020	1.4/7	6.59	1.4	4.63	2.8	11.24
12	"A Hell of a Week: Part Two"	January 28, 2020	1.4/7	6.42	1.2	4.29	2.6	10.73
13	"A Hell of a Week: Part Three"	February 11, 2020	1.4	6.40	1.3	4.41	2.7	10.81
14	"The Cabin"	February 18, 2020	1.3	6.46	1.4	4.54	2.7	11.00
15	"Clouds"	February 25, 2020	1.4	6.98	1.3	4.52	2.7	11.51
16	"New York, New York, New York"	March 10, 2020	1.1	5.62	1.4	4.76	2.5	10.38
17	"After the Fire"	March 17, 2020	1.4	7.07	1.3	4.67	2.7	11.74
18	"Strangers: Part Two"	March 24, 2020	1.7	7.96	1.2	4.23	2.9	12.19
