= This Is Us season 3 =

Season of television series This Is Us

This Is Us
- Season 3
- Promotional poster
- Starring: Milo Ventimiglia; Mandy Moore; Sterling K. Brown; Chrissy Metz; Justin Hartley; Susan Kelechi Watson; Chris Sullivan; Jon Huertas; Melanie Liburd; Niles Fitch; Logan Shroyer; Hannah Zeile; Mackenzie Hancsicsak; Parker Bates; Lonnie Chavis; Eris Baker; Faithe Herman; Lyric Ross
- No. of episodes: 18

Release
- Original network: NBC
- Original release: September 25, 2018 – April 2, 2019

Season chronology
- ← Previous; Season 2 Next → Season 4

The third season of the American television series This Is Us continues to follow the lives and connections of the Pearson family across several time periods. The season is produced by Rhode Island Ave. Productions, Zaftig Films, and 20th Century Fox Television, with Dan Fogelman, Isaac Aptaker, and Elizabeth Berger serving as showrunners.

A third season was ordered, alongside a second season, in January 2017, with production for season three beginning in July 2018. The season stars an ensemble cast featuring Milo Ventimiglia, Mandy Moore, Sterling K. Brown, Chrissy Metz, Justin Hartley, Susan Kelechi Watson, Chris Sullivan, Jon Huertas, Melanie Liburd, Niles Fitch, Logan Shroyer, Hannah Zeile, Mackenzie Hancsicsak, Parker Bates, Eris Baker, Faithe Herman, Lonnie Chavis, and Lyric Ross.

The third season premiered on September 25, 2018 and concluded on April 2, 2019. The season consisted of 18 episodes.

== Cast and characters ==
=== Main ===
- Milo Ventimiglia as Jack Pearson
- Mandy Moore as Rebecca Pearson
- Sterling K. Brown as Randall Pearson
  - Niles Fitch as teenage Randall Pearson
  - Lonnie Chavis as young Randall Pearson
- Chrissy Metz as Kate Pearson
  - Hannah Zeile as teenage Kate Pearson
  - Mackenzie Hancsicsak as young Kate Pearson
- Justin Hartley as Kevin Pearson
  - Logan Shroyer as teenage Kevin Pearson
  - Parker Bates as young Kevin Pearson
- Susan Kelechi Watson as Beth Pearson
- Chris Sullivan as Toby Damon
- Jon Huertas as Miguel Rivas
- Melanie Liburd as Zoe Baker
- Eris Baker as Tess Pearson
- Faithe Herman as Annie Pearson
- Lyric Ross as Deja Andrews

=== Recurring ===
- Caitlin Thompson as Madison
- Sumalee Montano as Dr. Gail Jasper
- Rob Morgan as Solomon Brown
- Michael Angarano as young adult Nicholas "Nick" Pearson
- Porter Duong as Hien
- Peter Onorati as Stanley Pearson

=== Guest ===
- Ron Cephas Jones as William H. "Shakespeare" Hill
- Jane Kaczmarek as Mrs. Philips
- Charlie Robinson as present-day Donald Robinson
- Wendie Malick as Mary Damon, Toby's mother.
- Dan Lauria as Mr. Damon, Toby's father.
- Tim Jo as Jae-Won Yoo
- Joy Brunson as Shauna, Deja's mother.
- Denis O'Hare as Jessie
- Griffin Dunne as Nicholas "Nick" Pearson
- Phylicia Rashad as Carol Clarke, Beth's mother.
- Carl Lumbly as Abe Clarke, Beth's father.
- Akira Akbar as young Beth Pearson
  - Rachel Hilson as teenage Beth Pearson
- Dakota Baccelli as young Zoe Baker
  - Brianna Reed as teenage Zoe Baker
- Goran Visnjic as Vincent Kelly, Beth's ballet teacher.
- Alexandra Breckenridge as Sophie

== Episodes ==
No. overall	No. in season	Title	Directed by	Written by	Original release date	Prod. code	U.S. viewers (millions)
37	1	"Nine Bucks"	Ken Olin	Dan Fogelman & Isaac Aptaker & Elizabeth Berger	September 25, 2018	3AZC01	10.54
The night Jack meets Rebecca, he has only nine dollars. As Franco Harris completes the Immaculate Reception, Jack takes Rebecca to a carnival. After it rains, he admits he could not afford an umbrella and that his life has been unstable since coming home from serving in Vietnam. Rebecca recounts their incompatibilities and the date's shortcomings but, because of "the way he looks at her," she kisses him and agrees to another date. Jack later sees another man giving her flowers and kissing her. In the present, Deja rebukes Randall for trying too hard to equate their experiences. She confronts her biological father and allows Randall and Beth to begin the adoption process. Kevin and Zoe are sleeping together; Beth believes Zoe uses men and will hurt Kevin, but fails to dissuade his romantic interest in Zoe. Dr. Jasper, a fertility specialist, initially declines Kate as a patient because of her risk factors, but ultimately reconsiders; Kate and Toby pursue treatment, despite a 90% chance of failure. Toby throws away his antidepressants because they decrease his sperm count. In the future, Randall and Tess prepare to "go see her," and Randall calls Toby, who uncertainly agrees to join them.
38	2	"A Philadelphia Story"	Chris Koch	Kay Oyegun	October 2, 2018	3AZC02	8.87
After Jack's death, the Pearsons look for a new home. Kevin is frequently drunk; Kate gains weight and never completed her Berklee application; Randall criticizes Rebecca for not stepping up. Rebecca admits she barely has the energy to get out of bed and wonders what would have happened if she had agreed to buy the house Jack showed her months before the fire. Randall is accepted to Howard, but turns it down to prioritize his family. In the present, Randall tries to effect repairs on a recreation center near his Philadelphia building; William's friend ChiChi tells Randall that focusing on the community's problems does not make him part of the community. Kevin's film premieres; Zoe skips it to work on her documentary in Chicago, but asks him to pick her up when she returns. Rebecca criticizes Kate and Toby's decision to try IVF; Toby rages at Rebecca, then leaves for hours, leaving Kate to question his mood swings. Rebecca administers Kate's hormone shot, and reveals that after losing Jack, she cannot bear the thought of her children suffering harm. Rebecca believes Kate will have children. Randall is hurt to learn Kate called herself the only sibling able to "carry on a piece of Jack."
39	3	"Katie Girls"	Rebecca Asher	Julia Brownell	October 9, 2018	3AZC03	8.91
As a child, Rebecca disdains the role of housewife. The day she and Jack have planned to have their second date, her high-school boyfriend Alan arrives, three years after she declined his invitation to move to London. Jack returns home; he and his mother leave Jack's emotionally abusive father. Rebecca agrees to relocate to New York City with Alan, but confides in his mother that she has feelings for someone else. Rebecca goes to see Jack and suggests they drive to Los Angeles together. In the present, the Pearsons love Kevin's film. Randall and Kate argue over her comment; he flies to LA to apologize and support her. Kate's egg extraction is an eightfold success; while under anesthesia, she envisions a conversation with her teenage and child selves and Jack, affirming her confidence in her future. Beth is laid off. After ChiChi's daughter Skye is injured in a mugging, Randall decides to run for city council. During an interview about his movie, Kevin realizes he knows nothing about Jack's military service; with Zoe's support, he reaches out to a man who served with Jack.
40	4	"Vietnam"	Ken Olin	Dan Fogelman & Tim O'Brien	October 16, 2018	3AZC05	8.92
Flashbacks to Jack's youth show that his father is a supportive non-drinker whose own father is emotionally distant. Nick is born at 11:58pm on October 18; Jack's father exhorts him to protect Nick. Jack believes seven-year-old Nick can be heroic. Nick stands up to their abusive father; Jack supports Nick and experiences tachycardia. When Nick is twenty-one, October 18 receives the fifth position in the first Vietnam War draft lottery. Jack plans to smuggle Nick into Canada, but Nick decides to prove himself by complying with the law. The next year, Marilyn suffers physical abuse; in Vietnam, Nick is disciplined via Article 15 and believes he will die in the war. Receiving Nick's letter, Jack enlists, hoping to find him; the family doctor advises Jack on how to conceal his heart condition. The following year, Jack's platoon is ambushed; his friend Donnie Robinson survives the severing of his foot as Jack comforts him. They are given lighter duty, guarding a village near Nick's post. A supply helicopter takes Jack to reunite with a war-hardened Nick.
41	5	"Toby"	Chris Koch	K.J. Steinberg	October 23, 2018	3AZC04	8.53
In 1998, Randall skips prom after Allison's father rejects him because of his race. Sophie brings a drunk Kevin to Miguel's. Miguel buys Rebecca a piano and handles some home maintenance; he told Jack he would look out for the Pearsons if Jack died. Rebecca suggests Kate use music as an emotional release, but Kate is not ready. Young Toby suffers anxiety and depression; his humor helps his mother's depression. His mother and a therapist help him regain functionality after Josie leaves him. In the present, Kate and Toby wait to hear if she is pregnant. Kate tells her impressed client that she abandons music when sad, derailing any singing career. Upon learning Kate is pregnant, Toby breaks down crying; Kate arranges for him to restart his medication. Randall's campaign event goes badly and he rethinks his goal. Beth tells Randall a job interview went well, but she actually lost her composure. In Baltimore, Donald Robinson tells Kevin that Jack was not a mechanic, but a combat sergeant who saved Donald's life. Zoe decides that Kevin is worth the stigma of an interracial relationship. Donald gives Kevin correspondence from Jack that includes a photograph of a Vietnamese woman wearing Jack's necklace.
42	6	"Kamsahamnida"	John Fortenberry	Vera Herbert	October 30, 2018	3AZC06	8.88
When the Big Three are young, Jack is injured boxing; Rebecca asks him to stop, but later supports it as a needed emotional outlet. To get closer to his father, Randall pretends he has been bullied, so Jack will teach him to box. In the present, Beth has an outburst, struggling with unemployment and her daughters' Girl Scout cookie sales. Randall fails to win over his rival's constituency at a black church, partially because he lives all the way in Alpine, New Jersey. Kevin leverages his South Korean fanbase to help Randall campaign in Koreatown. A Korean-American man named Jae-won becomes Randall's campaign manager after previous skepticism. Deja encourages Beth to talk to Randall; Beth joins Randall's campaign. Rebecca reassures Kate that she will be able to figure out motherhood and that uncertainty is normal. Kate tells her family she is pregnant, but her announcement looms over Toby's depression. Toby begins to pick himself up; Kate promises Toby that her life has made her strong enough to support him. Zoe agrees to travel to Vietnam with Kevin, who believes Jack loved the woman in the photograph.
43	7	"Sometimes"	Ken Olin	Bekah Brunstetter	November 13, 2018	3AZC07	8.47
Serving in Vietnam, Jack wants a struggling Nick transferred to his unit, but commanding officer Major Dawson refuses because brothers are not normally assigned to serve together. A man named Bao transports Jack back to his base; Bao apparently participates in the manufacture of land mines and admits to "sometimes" being Viet Cong. At night, Jack sees the woman wearing the necklace; she runs away. Dawson gives Jack two weeks with Nick. Rebecca and Jack drive to Los Angeles for her singing audition. They are intimate, but Jack will not speak of his nightmares. In LA, record executives call Rebecca "Pittsburgh good." In Reseda, Jack tells the Wattersons that he considers himself responsible for the death of their son, Roger; they absolve him of blame. Jack starts calling Rebecca, "Bec." Her singing brings him to tears, after he previously admitted he never cries. They agree to return home to Pittsburgh. In present-day Vietnam, Kevin tells a reserved Zoe he loves her and wants them to be open with each other, unlike his father's secrecy. Zoe admits her father sexually abused her, but decides not to let her father ruin her relationship with Kevin. Kevin learns the necklace is now mass produced.
44	8	"Six Thanksgivings"	Catherine Hardwicke	Kevin Falls	November 20, 2018	3AZC08	7.91
During the Vietnam War, Jack's unit celebrates Thanksgiving. Jack treats an injured boy whose mother gives Jack the necklace, but Nick refuses to assist; a villager betrayed Nick's first commander, resulting in his death. In 1997, Miguel spends Thanksgiving with the Pearsons and worries that his ex-wife is distancing their children from him. Randall writes a college essay about how loved ones and strangers can affect one's life. William and Jesse meet at a recovery group meeting. Jesse opens up to William, then joins him and other musicians for Thanksgiving. Jesse makes it clear to William that he is single. In the present, Beth and Jae-won clash during a campaign event; Randall admits he has been siding with Beth, regardless of the merits of her ideas, to boost her morale. At Randall's house, Kate and Toby prepare Thanksgiving dinner. Kate supports Tess, who is having her first period; Tess also comes out as LGBT, but is not ready to tell her parents. Toby orders prepared food; Kate commends him for creating "magic" like Jack would have. Rebecca and Miguel visit Miguel's children, Amber and Andy; they have not been close to him, but they acknowledge his request that they respect Rebecca.
45	9	"The Beginning Is the End Is the Beginning"	Ken Olin	Shukree Hassan Tilghman	November 27, 2018	3AZC09	8.98
In Vietnam, Jack and Nicky come to blows and Nick abuses drugs. Nicky is obsessed with their "mission" to "kill." He disappears from camp and a boat explodes, apparently with an American aboard. In the present, Kevin and Zoe visit the village, but learn nothing about Jack or the woman. Their guide tells Kevin that Nicholas Pearson did not die in the Vietnam War; unbeknownst to them, Nicky is alive in Bradford, Pennsylvania. Kate applies for a job as a chorus teacher; she is a good fit, but cannot be hired without a college degree. At Toby's instigation, she enrolls in community college. Overcoming their fears for the future, they learn the baby is a boy. Randall gives a charismatic debate performance, but Jae-won determines their polling shortfall is insurmountable. Tess tells her parents she may be gay. Deja wants to visit Shauna in Delaware. Beth retracts her support for Randall's campaign, but he reneges on his promise to grant her veto power; she forces him to sleep on the couch. In the future, Beth is a dance instructor, and she and the other Pearsons plan to visit Rebecca.
46	10	"The Last Seven Weeks"	Roxann Dawson	Laura Kenar	January 15, 2019	3AZC10	7.74
On election night, the Pearsons wait for the results. The preceding seven weeks are depicted. Randall realizes his mistake; he spends time with his family and Beth decides the family should follow through on a Philadelphia church visit. Kevin asks Zoe to move in with him, which she does but without unpacking. While researching his uncle, Kevin learns Zoe dumped an ex via email; he fears she will leave him and they break up. Late on election night, Zoe discloses how difficult it is for her to leave her comfort zone, and they get back together. Zoe finally unpacks and finds a letter Nicky sent Jack. Kate and Toby sell some possessions to make room for a nursery, but Kate mistakenly sells Toby's original Star Wars action figures, which he intended to pass on to his child. They go after the buyer, but in vain; Kate buys replacements for Toby online and Toby gives Kate a handmade stadium, like the one Jack built for her that was lost in the fire. Randall gets a call that he won the election.
47	11	"Songbird Road: Part One"	Chris Koch	Kevin Falls & Tim O'Brien	January 22, 2019	3AZC11	8.22
Young Nicky hopes to become a doctor who owns a house and a boat. In Vietnam, a drug-intoxicated Nicky takes Lanh, the boy whose foot Jack treated, to go "fishing" with grenades; the boat explodes, killing Lanh. For years, Jack ignores postcards Nicky sends to his office. In 1992, Jack receives a postcard at home; after telling Kevin to correct, rather than repeat Jack's mistakes, Jack visits Nicky at his trailer in Bradford. Jack tells Nicky to stop contacting him, as he wants to forget the war. Nicky is haunted by the sight of Lanh's grieving mother. Nicky gives Jack the old war photos; Jack shows Nicky a photograph of his family and leaves. In the present, Kevin tells Randall, Kate, and Rebecca about Nicky. Rebecca questions her decision to let Jack keep his secrets. The siblings drive to Bradford and meet Nicky. They tell him of Jack's death; Nicky tells them his story and sends them away. On the way out of town, Kevin decides they should not abandon Nicky like Jack did. Returning to the trailer, they find Nicky sitting with a gun, lamenting that he never told Jack the incident was an accident.
48	12	"Songbird Road: Part Two"	Ken Olin	Julia Brownell	February 12, 2019	3AZC12	7.40
In 1992, an emotionally drained Jack returns from seeing Nicky. Rebecca takes Jack's place to bring Kevin to a signing by Pirates player John Smiley and is touched when Smiley tells her that Kevin researched his future professional home of Minneapolis for him. At the house, Kate and Randall make a mess constructing Valentines; Jack loses his temper and destroys a plate, but apologizes and starts a sequin fight. In the present, the siblings bring Nicky to a hotel. Rebecca arrives and recalls the weekend Jack saw Nicky. Before Kate flies out, she and Randall visit the house rebuilt where they lived. Kate realizes she doesn't remember Jack's anger, only the fun; Randall says that shows Jack was a good father and she will be a good mother, even though all parents have missteps. Nicky tells Rebecca a childhood memory of Jack and agrees to try a local veteran center's programs at least once. Rebecca commends Kevin for his effort, unaware he drank Nicky's alcohol while cleaning the trailer.
49	13	"Our Little Island Girl"	Anne Fletcher	Eboni Freeman	February 19, 2019	3AZC13	7.55
In the present, Beth and Zoe visit their mother Carol after she bruises her hip at work as a high-school principal; they cannot convince her to retire. In the past, a young Beth gets accepted into a prestigious ballet academy and hopes to become a pioneering African-American principal dancer. Her parents, Abe and Carol Clarke, work longer hours to pay her tuition. Four years later, Beth is dedicated, but struggles to keep up. Abe dies of lung cancer, shortly after retelling Beth the story of how she danced before she walked. Beth confronts Carol over taking away her dream and accuses her of being emotionally disconnected. The next day, Carol tells Beth that, after Abe died, she did lose that part of herself. Beth thanks Carol for helping her have a good life and Carol apologizes for taking away Beth's dream too quickly. When Beth didn't get a critical showcase solo, Carol stopped paying for her dancing and convinced Beth to attend college. Beth momentarily encounters a teenage Randall at a Carnegie Mellon University freshman mixer. Carol returns to work. Randall takes Beth to a dance studio, where she performs passionately and asks about becoming a teacher.
50	14	"The Graduates"	Sarah Boyd	K.J. Steinberg & Danielle Bauman	March 5, 2019	3AZC14	7.82
In 1982, toddlers Kate and Kevin soothe each other. In 1998, the Big Three graduate from high school. Kate, with no plans and upset that Kevin is moving to New York with Sophie, skips her graduation ceremony; Randall is his school's valedictorian. Rebecca has a panic attack over Jack's absence from the milestone; Miguel calms her. Miguel later takes Rebecca, in tears after watching old home movies, to a grief support group meeting. At a graduation party, Kate, Kevin, and Randall agree to stay in each other's lives. In the present, Deja's teacher tells Randall that Deja, repeating seventh grade, is a gifted writer and is ready for high school; Deja, loving the family's stable routine, decides not to skip eighth grade. Beth loves teaching dance, but Randall asks her to defer teaching to spend more time with their daughters. Toby holds a graduation ceremony for Kate. Kevin leaves early to drink alone, lying to his family and Zoe. Kate confronts him and drives him to an AA meeting but, en route, her water breaks at 28 weeks. Kate is hospitalized and her labor is medically delayed; Kevin and Randall reassure her that her son will live.
51	15	"The Waiting Room"	Kevin Hooks	Bekah Brunstetter	March 12, 2019	3AZC15	7.74
In the hospital waiting room, tensions rise as the Pearsons wait for news on Kate and the baby. Randall and Beth bicker and cannot agree how best to obtain child care, especially after learning Rebecca and Miguel are considering relocating to California for Kate. Kevin is hostile to Madison, whom Miguel encourages to find her own way to support Kate; Madison later retrieves a Ruth Bader Ginsburg doll Kate bought as a gift for her baby. Zoe hears out Kevin's explanation of his behavior and indicates to Beth that she will stay with Kevin; Zoe later tells Beth that a water bottle Kevin obtained earlier actually contained vodka. Miguel tries to keep everyone occupied and complains that he is marginalized within the family. Rebecca is disconnected and quiet until Kevin and Randall's arguing prompts an outburst; remembering her experience when Jack died, Rebecca banishes anything that isn't about Kate. Toby informs the family that Kate is okay, their son was born via caesarean section, and he is on a ventilator. Toby and Kate agree to name the baby Jack. Kate prays to her father for the baby's health and hopes that her son will have Justice Ginsburg's strength.
52	16	"Don't Take My Sunshine Away"	George Tillman Jr.	Vera Herbert	March 19, 2019	3AZC16	7.64
In 1992, the Big Three attend a school dance. Randall wants to study, but chaperones Jack and Rebecca insist he honor his commitment to escort Kate's friend Jessica. Kevin ropes a reluctant Sophie into a prank on the principal. Rebecca requests an old song to dance to with Jack, who never attended a dance. In the present, Toby struggles to bond with hospitalized baby Jack. Toby only sees Jack's suffering, but Kate sees herself and Toby in him, inspiring Toby to hold the baby. Kevin and Zoe enter couples therapy. Kevin wants children, but Zoe does not. Kevin visits Sophie, who is engaged. She tells him his charm has spared him from difficult decisions. Kevin chooses a life with Zoe, even without children. Randall and Beth are exhausted by their new schedules. Randall asks Beth to skip an important work opportunity to accompany him to dinner with the city council president. Thinking Beth has stood him up, he leaves her an insulting phone message. Beth arrives and is gracious at dinner, despite having already received the message. She tells him to sleep at his office, but he confronts her and they close the bedroom door to have it out.
53	17	"R & B"	Kevin Hooks	Kay Oyegun	March 26, 2019	3AZC17	7.63
In 1998, Kevin coaches Randall to successfully ask Beth out. She is overwhelmed when he wears a suit and takes her to an upscale restaurant that discriminates against them; she asks him not to call her, but he privately believes they will marry. Seven years later, they are a couple, but Beth has declined Randall's repeated marriage proposals. Beth chafes that Randall's life "consumes" them. Rebecca tells Beth that Randall didn't know his place in the universe until he met her. Beth and Randall agree to be equals; she accepts his proposal. On their wedding day, they write their vows together. After Tess's birth, Beth fears the couple's success always comes through Beth's sacrifices. After William and Kevin move in, Beth plans to secretly spend one night alone at a hotel, but returns home after Randall finds out and charms her. In the present, Beth confronts Randall over always catering to his whims; Randall remembers his parents' similar fight about Rebecca's singing. Beth blames Randall's mental health for limiting her opportunities, but immediately regrets it. Randall, with nothing else to say, returns to Philadelphia. Randall and Beth lie awake, Randall in his office and Beth on the bedroom floor.
54	18	"Her"	Ken Olin	Isaac Aptaker & Elizabeth Berger	April 2, 2019	3AZC18	8.22
During the Big Three's childhood, Rebecca crashes the car and is hospitalized. Randall is especially worried about her and Jack ultimately brings the children back to the hospital before dawn. To Jack, Rebecca is the family's "engine." In the present, Rebecca dominates Kate's conversations with healthcare professionals about baby Jack. Kate is frustrated, but ultimately admits that Rebecca was a great mom; Kate affirms she wants Jack to have Rebecca's "magic" in his life. Kevin and Zoe babysit Tess and Annie. Kevin helps Tess understand that forming an identity is a lifelong process. Realizing that Kevin is meant to be a father, Zoe ends their relationship. Randall and Beth agree they want to find a way forward. Deja admonishes Randall for endangering the good fortune he has had in life. Randall tells Beth he will resign, but she decides the family will relocate to Philadelphia; they will sell the house and economize so she can open her own dance studio. In the future, the Pearson family—including a still-married Randall and Beth, adult Tess, Toby, young Jack (who is not shown onscreen), Kevin's preteen son, and Nicky—gathers at Kevin's home, where an elderly Rebecca is in failing health.

== Production ==
=== Development ===
On January 18, 2017, NBC renewed the series for a second and third season of 18 episodes each, for a total of 36 additional episodes.

=== Casting ===
Main cast members Milo Ventimiglia, Mandy Moore, Sterling K. Brown, Chrissy Metz, Justin Hartley, Susan Kelechi Watson, Chris Sullivan, Jon Huertas and Ron Cephas Jones return from the second season as Jack Pearson, Rebecca Pearson, Randall Pearson, Kate Pearson, Kevin Pearson, Beth Pearson, Toby Damon, Miguel Rivas, and William H. Hill, respectively. Lyric Ross, who recurred as Deja throughout the second season, was subsequently promoted to the principal cast in the third season. In August 2018, Michael Angarano was cast to recur as Nick Pearson, Jack Pearson's brother; the character was first mentioned in the second season, and previously was depicted only briefly as a child. Melanie Liburd was promoted to series regular after guest starring in the second season as Zoe, Beth Pearson's cousin and Kevin Pearson's new love interest.

=== Filming ===
Production on the season officially began on July 10, 2018, in Los Angeles.

== Reception ==
=== Ratings ===
Viewership and ratings per episode of This Is Us season 3
No.	Title	Air date	Rating/share (18–49)	Viewers (millions)	DVR (18–49)	DVR viewers (millions)	Total (18–49)	Total viewers (millions)
1	"Nine Bucks"	September 25, 2018	3.0/12	10.54	1.9	5.76	4.9	16.30
2	"A Philadelphia Story"	October 2, 2018	2.4/9	8.87	1.9	5.68	4.3	14.55
3	"Katie Girls"	October 9, 2018	2.3/9	8.91	1.9	5.68	4.2	14.59
4	"Vietnam"	October 16, 2018	2.2/9	8.92	1.8	5.50	4.0	14.43
5	"Toby"	October 23, 2018	2.1/8	8.53	1.8	5.50	3.9	14.03
6	"Kamsahamnida"	October 30, 2018	2.1/9	8.88	1.7	5.15	3.8	14.03
7	"Sometimes"	November 13, 2018	2.0/8	8.47	1.8	5.33	3.8	13.81
8	"Six Thanksgivings"	November 20, 2018	1.8/8	7.91	2.0	6.10	3.8	14.01
9	"The Beginning Is the End Is the Beginning"	November 27, 2018	2.1/9	8.98	1.7	5.16	3.8	14.14
10	"The Last Seven Weeks"	January 15, 2019	2.0/8	7.74	1.8	5.50	3.8	13.24
11	"Songbird Road (Part 1)"	January 22, 2019	1.9/8	8.22	1.8	5.50	3.7	13.72
12	"Songbird Road (Part 2)"	February 12, 2019	1.7/7	7.40	1.7	5.42	3.5	12.82
13	"Our Little Island Girl"	February 19, 2019	1.8/8	7.55	1.6	5.19	3.4	12.75
14	"The Graduates"	March 5, 2019	1.7/7	7.82	1.8	5.66	3.5	13.48
15	"The Waiting Room"	March 12, 2019	1.8/7	7.74	1.7	5.33	3.5	13.06
16	"Don't Take My Sunshine Away"	March 19, 2019	1.7/7	7.64	1.7	5.21	3.4	12.86
17	"R & B"	March 26, 2019	1.7/7	7.63	1.6	5.17	3.3	12.80
18	"Her"	April 2, 2019	1.9/8	8.22	1.7	5.33	3.6	13.55
