= This Is Us season 5 =

Season of television series This Is Us

This Is Us
- Season 5
- Starring: Milo Ventimiglia; Mandy Moore; Sterling K. Brown; Chrissy Metz; Justin Hartley; Susan Kelechi Watson; Chris Sullivan; Jon Huertas; Caitlin Thompson; Niles Fitch; Logan Shroyer; Hannah Zeile; Mackenzie Hancsicsak; Parker Bates; Lonnie Chavis; Eris Baker; Faithe Herman; Lyric Ross; Asante Blackk
- No. of episodes: 16

Release
- Original network: NBC
- Original release: October 27, 2020 – May 25, 2021

Season chronology
- ← Previous; Season 4 Next → Season 6

The fifth season of the American television series This Is Us continues to follow the lives and connections of the Pearson family across several time periods. The season is produced by Rhode Island Ave. Productions, Zaftig Films, and 20th Television, with Dan Fogelman, Isaac Aptaker, and Elizabeth Berger serving as showrunners.

The series was renewed for a fourth, fifth, and sixth season in May 2019. The season stars an ensemble cast featuring Milo Ventimiglia, Mandy Moore, Sterling K. Brown, Chrissy Metz, Justin Hartley, Susan Kelechi Watson, Chris Sullivan, Jon Huertas, Niles Fitch, Logan Shroyer, Hannah Zeile, Mackenzie Hancsicsak, Parker Bates, Eris Baker, Faithe Herman, Lonnie Chavis, Lyric Ross, Asante Blackk and Griffin Dunne.

The fifth season premiered on October 27, 2020, and concluded on May 25, 2021. The season consisted of 16 episodes.

== Cast and characters ==
=== Main ===
- Milo Ventimiglia as Jack Pearson
- Mandy Moore as Rebecca Pearson
- Sterling K. Brown as Randall Pearson
  - Niles Fitch as teenage Randall Pearson
  - Lonnie Chavis as young Randall Pearson
- Chrissy Metz as Kate Pearson
  - Hannah Zeile as teenage Kate Pearson
  - Mackenzie Hancsicsak as young Kate Pearson
- Justin Hartley as Kevin Pearson
  - Logan Shroyer as teenage Kevin Pearson
  - Parker Bates as young Kevin Pearson
- Susan Kelechi Watson as Beth Pearson
- Chris Sullivan as Toby Damon
- Jon Huertas as Miguel Rivas
- Caitlin Thompson as Madison Simons
- Eris Baker as Tess Pearson
- Faithe Herman as Annie Pearson
- Lyric Ross as Deja Pearson
- Asante Blackk as Malik Hodges

=== Recurring ===
- Timothy Omundson as Gregory, Toby and Kate's neighbor.
- Jennifer C. Holmes as Laurel DuBois, Randall's birth mother who was William's lover.
- Vien Hong as Hai Lang, Vietnamese American refugee and fisherman who knew Randall's birth mother.
- Griffin Dunne as Nicky Pearson
  - Michael Angarano as young Nicky Pearson
- Jennifer Morrison as Cassidy Sharp

=== Guest ===
- George Eads as Coach
- Phylicia Rashad as Carol Clarke
- Alexandra Breckenridge as Sophie
- Melanie Liburd as Zoe Baker

== Episodes ==
No. overall	No. in season	Title	Directed by	Written by	Original release date	Prod. code	U.S. viewers (millions)
73	1	"Forty"	Ken Olin	Dan Fogelman & Kay Oyegun & Jake Schnesel	October 27, 2020	5AZC01	7.30
74	2	"Forty"	Ken Olin	Dan Fogelman & Kay Oyegun & Jake Schnesel	October 27, 2020	5AZC02	7.30
Part One: In 1980, William and Laurel make plans but are downtrodden by failed activism, stunted finances, and their drug addictions. William promises to "make [their son] a family" if Laurel can't raise him. William leaves with his baby when the paramedics treating Laurel's overdose mention calling the police. Some time after abandoning his son at the fire station, he decides to go to the hospital after him. In the present, the COVID-19 pandemic prompts Kevin and Madison to quarantine together; they start a relationship and announce her pregnancy to family members. Rebecca's clinical trial is postponed. Randall is unresponsive when Kate requests guidance for involvement in the George Floyd protests. Randall finds himself more able to open up to Malik than to his therapist, telling him the white Pearsons never discussed similar incidents. For their birthday, Kate, Kevin, and their families drive to the cabin, where Rebecca and Miguel are quarantined. Madison fears for the babies after a fall. Kevin proposes marriage, and reaffirms it after urgent care allays her fears. Part Two: Concerned for a missing Rebecca, Kate is unable to reach Kevin and calls Randall, who drives to the cabin, arriving after police escort Rebecca home. Randall identifies a drug interaction that caused Rebecca's episode. Kate admits she does not know how to talk to Randall about social justice. Randall tells Dr. Leigh that he will be switching to a Black therapist; he tells Beth that he is "sad" with everything going on around him, but not breaking down. Toby advises a despairing Miguel to take things "one day at a time," as Toby does with his own depression. When Rebecca suggests planting an apple tree sapling, Miguel instead gets apple seeds, committing to living each day with her. An adoption agency identifies a potential baby for Kate and Toby. In the past, William prays for his son's future in the hospital chapel. He also feels guilt-ridden over obtaining the heroin for Laurel's childbirth pain. Feet away, Jack prays for Rebecca to survive childbirth. William feels unable to return home, unaware Laurel unexpectedly revived moments after he left.
75	3	"Changes"	Anne Fletcher	Kevin Falls	November 10, 2020	5AZC03	6.85
The Big Three, as eighth graders, experience puberty. Kate thinks Stewart wants to get back together, but he's only interested in their school project; Rebecca encourages her to follow her heart. Their classmate Tanya flirts with an uncomfortable Randall. Jack encourages Kevin's weight training, remembering his own father's less supportive approach. Kevin secretly exercises more at night. In the present, Kevin and Madison open up with each other about their lifelong body-image struggles. Kate and Toby meet birth mom Ellie, a young, widowed mother pregnant by a one-night stand. Toby and Kate find a happy medium between his apprehension and her excitement. Tess stands by her "profane" video insulting a teacher; Randall is proud of Tess for expressing herself, but he stands with Beth and grounds Tess. Randall's new therapist, Dr. Vance, asks him to write down a childhood story; he recalls that Tanya openly fetishized his Blackness, repulsing him, and he never told anyone. Elsewhere, a Vietnamese man teaches his granddaughter to fish, and reveals he learned to cook to impress the woman whose photos adorn his home: Laurel.
76	4	"Honestly"	Ken Olin	Elan Mastai	November 17, 2020	5AZC04	6.57
Rebecca cannot resist tending to incessantly crying baby Kevin, who finally self-soothes after Jack physically blocks Rebecca from intervening. In eighth grade, Kevin wants to quit football after his coach criticizes him for not knowing the plays. Rebecca would let him, but Jack says Rebecca's coddling has made Kevin "soft." Kevin overhears the discussion and asks Randall for help studying the plays. In the present, Kevin is flustered when his new film's director offers him no feedback. The director later tells Kevin that if he commits to a role, he could be great. Kate accompanies Ellie to her ultrasound; Ellie tells Kate she had initially considered an abortion. The conversation evokes a past experience Kate kept secret from her family; after her breakup with Marc, she learned she was pregnant. While shadowing Randall at work, Malik is distracted by a call about Janelle and accidentally livestreams a partially undressed Randall preparing to exercise. Seeing Malik's commitment to fatherhood and a career, Randall offers him an internship despite the mistake. The video goes viral and the Vietnamese man re-watches an earlier moment when Randall mentions William Hill.
77	5	"A Long Road Home"	Anne Fletcher	K.J. Steinberg	January 5, 2021	5AZC05	5.20
In 1998, eighteen-year-old Kate decides to get an abortion. During the mandatory waiting period, she visits Marc, who is still dismissive and inconsiderate; she quickly leaves without confiding in him. She terminates her pregnancy, telling no one. A talent manager invites Kevin to LA; he accepts, despite Randall's advice that it could endanger Kevin and Sophie's marriage. In the present, Kate learns Marc lives in San Diego. Toby drives her there to confront him; finding him unchanged, Kate confronts him for doing real harm to her, and declares she is returning that "disease" to him. The Vietnamese man, Hai, contacts Randall's office to relay that Laurel didn't die until 2015, leaving Randall wondering if William lied to him. Kevin's film shoot relocates to Vancouver, which would separate him from Madison until shortly before her due date. He calls Randall for advice; they make peace, but Randall is unable to discuss Kevin's problem as he prepares to call Hai on Dr. Vance's advice. Hai says William had told Randall the truth as he knew it. Randall and Beth agree to meet Hai in New Orleans.
78	6	"Birth Mother"	Kay Oyegun	Eboni Freeman & Kay Oyegun	January 12, 2021	5AZC06	5.45
In New Orleans, Hai relates Laurel's life story to Randall and Beth. Laurel DuBois chafed under her conservative upbringing, but is close to her ostracized paternal aunt Mae and her older brother, Jackson, who dies in the Vietnam War. To grieve, Mae tells her to scream in the lake; Hai, a Vietnamese refugee fishing nearby, thinks she is drowning and tries to save her, after which they fall in love. Faced with her father's expectation that she marry his hand-picked suitor, Laurel asks Hai to run away to Chicago with her; Hai refuses because of his family, and she later leaves for Pittsburgh. After her overdose, Laurel is sentenced to five years in a California prison for drug possession. After her release, Laurel is taken in by Mae. They operate a farm stand, and Laurel connects from afar with fish vendor Hai, now a married father. Decades later, Hai is a widower; he and Laurel spend the last two years of her life together and happy after she is diagnosed with cancer. Her son was always on her mind. Hai gives Randall the keys to Mae's farmhouse. That night, Randall wades into the lake, imagines seeing his mother in her youth and old age, and screams his grief. Beth notes Randall's newfound "lightness." He calls Kevin, hoping to release more pain, but Kevin is frantically trying to return to LA from Vancouver because Madison is in labor.
79	7	"There"	Kevin Rodney Sullivan	Isaac Aptaker & Elizabeth Berger	February 9, 2021	5AZC07	5.12
Teenaged Jack plays Little League Baseball, dreading Stanley's inevitable drunkenness. Stanley demands Jack drive them home; en route, Jack yells at Stanley after continued disparagement over his team's loss. Jack brings eighth-grader Kevin to football camp. Kevin worries football is his only merit, having overheard Jack call him "soft". Upon learning Kevin's coach calls him "stupid", Jack tells Kevin how Stanley's behavior displaced Jack's love of baseball. He worries he has become like Stanley, but Kevin reassures him he is a better father. Jack orders the coach to respect Kevin. In the present, Kevin leaves the film set after learning Madison is in labor, quitting when director Foster demands he return. Kevin rescues a crashed motorist, a father who reassures him his children won't remember if Kevin misses their birth. Kevin wants to emulate Jack's "there-ness". Having dropped his wallet beside the crash, Kevin begs a TSA agent to help him board his flight. Madison is alone at the hospital, as Kate is at Ellie's labor induction. Randall and Beth call Madison; in tears after Randall calls her "family", she accepts their offer to stay on the line.
80	8	"In the Room"	Ken Olin	Vera Herbert	February 16, 2021	5AZC08	5.76
In flashbacks to the 1960s, Nasir Ahmed's long work hours as a computer scientist frustrates his wife Esther, until he explains that his data compression algorithm could someday enable them to instantly transmit video of their son to Esther's mother in Argentina. Rebecca and Jack take a romantic getaway to the cabin after the eighth-grader Big Three opt out. A burst pipe damages the kids' childhood artwork, embodying Jack's fears that the family is growing apart. Rebecca salvages a paper depicting their five hand prints, now running together; she tells him their family will endure despite changes. In the present, Randall coaches Madison through labor until Kevin arrives. The twins are born: Nicholas, after Uncle Nicky, and Frances, after Madison's grandmother. Kevin and Randall reaffirm their love. Ellie gives birth and wishes her baby a good life. Toby bonds with an elderly man in the hospital parking lot whose wife has COVID-19; the man later learns that his wife, Rose, can finally return home. A moved Toby chooses "Rose" as his daughter Hailey's middle name. At the cabin, Rebecca agonizes over being away from her grandchildren's births, but is thrilled as everyone greets the babies by video chat. Kate dubs the newborn cousins "the new Big Three."
81	9	"The Ride"	Jon Huertas	Julia Brownell	February 23, 2021	5AZC09	5.10
Jack and Rebecca bring the newborn Big Three home. Stressed by an aggressive driver, Jack drinks whiskey and has Rebecca drive them. Each doubting their own parenting ability, they reassure each other. Randall and Beth are at ease bringing Annie home, but Randall upsets Beth by suggesting he'd like a son; they make up and he explains he wants a large family to make up for not knowing his birth parents. Madison defuses Kevin's argument with a paparazzo while bringing the twins home. He dreams Jack telling him not to repeat Jack's mistake of comparing himself to his father. Kevin and Madison formalize their engagement. Ellie decides not to be part of Hailey's life. Toby tells Kate she is strong enough to handle anything, including the fact that he was laid off earlier that day. An adult Deja is a medical student. She is pregnant and has told Annie but not Randall. Annie drives her to Kevin's house, where someone else arrives as Randall prepares to take his daughters to see Rebecca.
82	10	"I've Got This"	Ken Olin	Casey Johnson & David Windsor	March 16, 2021	5AZC10	5.00
When the Big Three are infants, Jack vies for a promotion by covering an expensive work dinner, and acquiesces to Rebecca's decision to manage the family's finances. In the present, Malik seeks Randall's advice when Janelle's mother, Jennifer, wants to be involved in the baby's life; Randall tells Malik he wishes he had known about his own mother earlier, and he reassures Deja that he would never side with Malik against her. Tess thinks visiting Carol is more accepting than Beth about her romantic relationship with her nonbinary friend Alex. Beth believes Carol disapproves of her chaotic home, but after Carol admits she misses the domestic activity of a family, Beth invites her to stay indefinitely. Kate's family visits Kevin's, but Toby's unsuccessful job interview sours the evening. Toby rejects Kevin's offers of financial assistance, insisting that their families are separate. Kate thanks Rebecca for providing a secure childhood, and tells Toby she is accepting a job offer at Jack's music school for the blind. Kevin tells Madison he has to accept her and their children as the entirety of his family. Nicky arrives on their doorstep.
83	11	"One Small Step ..."	Yasu Tanida	Laura Kenar	March 23, 2021	5AZC11	5.15
In 1969, amid the first Moon landing and before the draft, Nicky and his colleague Sally from the animal clinic fall in love. Sally invites Nicky to attend Woodstock with her, and then live as bohemians in California. Nicky accepts, but ultimately stands Sally up for reasons that remain unclear. Years later, a reclusive Nicky agrees to celebrate war buddy Lieutenant Sheehan’s engagement at a bar in Erie, which Jack will also attend. Nicky sees Jack enter, but neither enters nor approaches him. Sheehan advises Jack to relegate Vietnam to the past, and to propose to the woman he's in love with. In the present, Nicky fails to understand that Nick and Franny's baptism is a Zoom event. Cassidy helps him prepare for his first flight in fifty years. Nicky's gift of handcrafted snow globes are inadvertently destroyed at airport security. After arriving, Nicky has second thoughts about being part of the babies' lives; he calls Cassidy, who tells him that, had Jack lived, she believes Nicky would have earned his forgiveness. Nicky gifts the babies Grisham thrillers from the airport bookstore, in one of which Kevin finds a photograph of Jack and Nicky taken by Sally.
84	12	"Both Things Can Be True"	Chris Koch	Danielle Bauman	April 6, 2021	5AZC12	4.53
In the past, Miguel helps Jack practice for his wedding proposal to Rebecca, although Jack is dejected that Dave has not given his blessing. Dave arrives and informs Jack that he will "tolerate" the marriage; Miguel steps in and proclaims that Jack is the kind of man that Dave should be grateful for. In the present, Kate begins her job as a teaching assistant helping blind children in music classes. Beth has trouble adjusting to Tess's relationship with Alex. The news of Kevin and Madison's engagement is released to the press. Madison tells Kevin that she prefers a smaller, understated wedding compared to what he has been planning. Nicky wants to help Miguel plan the rehearsal dinner for Kevin and Madison, but repeatedly clashes with him. Randall attends his first trans racial-adoption support-group meeting. Kevin calls Randall and asks him to be best man at his wedding. While Randall immediately accepts, Kevin still wants to fly out and have a discussion with him face-to-face in Philadelphia.
85	13	"Brotherly Love"	Kay Oyegun	Jon Dorsey	April 13, 2021	5AZC13	4.81
In the past, Jack takes a young Kevin and Randall to a live taping of Mister Rogers' Neighborhood. Jack uses a confusion over Randall's parentage to ensure he gets preferential treatment, spurring Kevin's jealousy. In another flashback, teenage Randall visits Kevin at his college in Los Angeles. The two initially get on well but get into a fight after Kevin's racial insensitivity increases. In the present, Kevin and Randall have a frank heart-to-heart about the racial insensitivities Randall felt while growing up. Randall explains his imagined childhood as the son of a local librarian and weather presenter, the only two Black adults he saw regularly as a boy, and how this fantasy was combined with the guilt of not fully appreciating his adopted family. Kevin acknowledges that his jealousy of Randall is in part influenced by his race, and Randall's dream of his imagined childhood finally shifts to show him being brought up by William and Laurel.
86	14	"The Music and the Mirror"	Jessica Yu	Jonny Gomez	May 11, 2021	5AZC14	5.08
In flashbacks, teenage Randall surprises Beth with a trip to the ballet, but she demands to go home. Beth opens up to Randall, revealing that her aspirations for a dance career were shattered after being told she was still "not good enough" despite having worked hard to improve; he comforts her with a slow dance to "All My Life". In the present, Kate and Toby experience plumbing issues. Toby reluctantly calls his father to fix the leaky pipe, and he vents his job loss; Toby's father gives him advice, and praises the Pearson's for their openness to express their feelings. Kevin and Madison play a game his old improv coach taught him. Madison, Kate, and Rebecca go wedding dress shopping. Kate brings Rebecca to her choir. Beth's dance studio shuts down due to the COVID-19 pandemic. Beth has an interview, but ends up canceling it. Upon discovering that Beth is cleaning at the studio, Randall arrives; he plays "All My Life", and the two slow dance as she cries.
87	15	"Jerry 2.0"	Milo Ventimiglia	Isaac Aptaker & Elizabeth Berger	May 18, 2021	5AZC15	4.90
In the past, the Pearson family goes to the cabin. Sophie is upset when Kevin reveals that he plans to stay in LA for his career. After watching Jerry Maguire with Randall and Beth, Kevin is inspired to write a mission statement; Kevin states that while he envisions a career, he also envisions raising a family with Sophie. In the present, Kevin receives a congratulatory call from Sophie as he and Madison prepare to have their bachelor and bachelorette parties. The men initially plan to go fishing, but they stay inside and watch Jerry Maguire after it starts raining. The women's party does not go as planned either, since Joe, the nude model that Kate hired, is Madison's ex-boyfriend. Kevin is perturbed when Nicky indirectly states that Kevin is only marrying Madison for the kids, and he later deletes Sophie's number. Madison plays The Newlywed Game, but Kate and Madison are put off when Kevin, in a prerecorded video, brushes off a question about envisioning a future with Madison. In the end, both Madison and Kevin have cold feet.
88	16	"The Adirondacks"	Ken Olin	Dan Fogelman	May 25, 2021	5AZC16	5.14
The Pearson family gets ready for Kevin and Madison's wedding. Deja finds out that Malik has been accepted to Harvard. Beth and Tess bond over accessorizing her dress after Tess explains how uncomfortable she feels. Toby gets a new job where he would need to travel to San Francisco for three days a week. Kate tries to quit her job, but her boss Phillip refuses to accept her resignation. Flashbacks of Madison's life are featured: her estranged mother gives her a pair of earrings for her wedding day; during her teens, her distant father advises her to settle for whatever relationships she might have; in 2016, Madison is dumped by her boyfriend and after a food binge, ends up in the support group where she met Kate and Toby. In the present, Madison realizes that Kevin does not love her and they break up just before the wedding. Rebecca gives Kevin a project: build the house that Jack promised her to construct, years before his death. Flash-forward to five years in the future: Beth, Madison and Kate are in a hotel room; the latter is in a wedding dress "for the last time" as she is about to marry Phillip; Nicky is married; Randall is dubbed a "rising star" in a New Yorker profile, and Kevin is prepping a toast and sharing a hotel room with an unseen someone.

== Production ==
=== Development ===
On May 12, 2019, NBC renewed the series for its fourth, fifth and sixth seasons, at 18 episodes each, for a total of 54 additional episodes. Due to later COVID-related complications, the fifth season was shortened to 16 episodes, as announced during on-air promotion of the season's fourteenth episode.

=== Filming ===
Production on season five started on September 24, 2020. COVID-related production delays resulted in filming being stalled for multiple weeks in January 2021, which in turn resulted in the broadcast of new episodes being postponed by almost a month.

== Reception ==
=== Ratings ===
Viewership and ratings per episode of This Is Us season 5
No.	Title	Air date	Rating (18–49)	Viewers (millions)	DVR (18–49)	DVR viewers (millions)	Total (18–49)	Total viewers (millions)
1–2	"Forty: Part One" / "Forty: Part Two"	October 27, 2020	1.4	7.30	1.2	4.14	2.6	11.44
3	"Changes"	November 10, 2020	1.3	6.85	1.2	4.26	2.5	11.12
4	"Honestly"	November 17, 2020	1.2	6.57	1.2	4.07	2.4	10.64
5	"A Long Road Home"	January 5, 2021	1.0	5.20	1.0	3.87	2.0	9.07
6	"Birth Mother"	January 12, 2021	1.0	5.45	1.0	3.84	2.0	9.29
7	"There"	February 9, 2021	1.0	5.12	0.9	3.66	1.9	8.78
8	"In the Room"	February 16, 2021	1.1	5.76	0.9	3.61	2.0	9.37
9	"The Ride"	February 23, 2021	1.0	5.10	0.9	3.55	1.9	8.65
10	"I've Got This"	March 16, 2021	0.8	5.00	—N/a	—N/a	—N/a	—N/a
11	"One Small Step ..."	March 23, 2021	0.9	5.15	—N/a	—N/a	—N/a	—N/a
12	"Both Things Can Be True"	April 6, 2021	0.8	4.53	0.8	3.53	1.6	8.06
13	"Brotherly Love"	April 13, 2021	0.8	4.81	0.8	3.44	1.6	8.25
14	"The Music and the Mirror"	May 11, 2021	0.8	5.08	0.8	3.44	1.7	8.51
15	"Jerry 2.0"	May 18, 2021	0.8	4.90	0.8	3.29	1.6	8.19
16	"The Adirondacks"	May 25, 2021	0.8	5.14	1.0	4.01	1.8	9.15
