= Oyegun =

Oyegun is a surname. Notable people with the surname include:

- John Odigie Oyegun (born 1939), Nigerian politician
- Kay Oyegun (fl. 2021), Nigerian born American writer, producer, and director
