= Kevin Falls =

American television writer and producer

Kevin Falls is an American television writer and producer. He was the creator and showrunner of the NBC television drama Journeyman. He worked as a consulting producer and writer on Shark. He served as an executive producer for the short lived Lyon's Den. He was a co-executive producer for both The West Wing and Sports Night. He won the Emmy Award for Outstanding Drama Series for three consecutive years (2001–2003) for his work on The West Wing. He created, wrote and executive produced Journeyman in 2007 and Franklin & Bash in 2011.

== Filmography ==
=== Producer ===
Year	Show	Role	Notes
2018–22	This is Us	Co-executive producer	Seasons 3–6
2018	The Resident	Consulting producer	Season 1
2016	Pitch	Executive producer	Season 1
2012	Made in Jersey	Executive producer	Season 1
2011–14	Franklin & Bash	Executive producer	Seasons 1–4
2007	Journeyman	Executive producer	Season 1
2006–07	Shark	Consulting producer	Season 1
2004	North Shore	Consulting producer	Season 1
2003	The Lyon's Den	Executive producer	Season 1
2000–03	The West Wing	Co-executive producer	Seasons 2–4
1999–2000	Sports Night	Co-executive producer	Season 2
1999	Arli$$	Co-executive producer	Season 4
1998	Arli$$	Supervising producer	Season 3

=== Writer ===
Year	Show	Episode	Notes
2022	This Is Us	"The Guitar Man"	Season 6, episode 8
2022	This Is Us	"One Giant Leap"	Season 6, episode 2
2020	This Is Us	"Changes"	Season 5, episode 3
2020	This Is Us	"Clouds"	Season 4, episode 15
2019	This Is Us	"The Club"	Season 4, episode 6
2019	This Is Us	"Songbird Road (Part 1)"	Season 3, episode 11
2018	This Is Us	"Six Thanksgivings"	Season 3, episode 8
2018	The Resident	"The Elopement"	Season 1, episode 7
2018	The Resident	"Family Affair"	Season 1, episode 8
2016	Pitch	"San Francisco"	Season 1, episode 7
2016	Pitch	"Beanball"	Season 1, episode 3
2015	Minority Report	"Everybody Returns"	Season 1, episode 10
2015	Minority Report	"Hawk-Eye"	Season 1, episode 3
2014	Franklin & Bash (Note: Also is a creator)	"Honor Thy Mother"	Season 4, episode 7
2014	Franklin & Bash	"The Curse of Hor' Aha"	Season 4, episode 1
2013	Franklin & Bash	"Gone in a Flash"	Season 3, episode 10
2013	Franklin & Bash	"Fleck"	Season 3, episode 6
2013	Franklin & Bash	"Dead and Alive"	Season 3, episode 2
2012	Franklin & Bash	"650 to SLC"	Season 2, episode 10
2012	Franklin & Bash	"Voir Dire"	Season 2, episode 6
2012	Franklin & Bash	"Jango & Rossi"	Season 2, episode 1
2011	Franklin & Bash	"Bro-Bono"	Season 1, episode 2
2011	Franklin & Bash	"Pilot"	Season 1, episode 1
2007	Journeyman (Note: Also is a creator)	"Blowback"	Season 1, episode 10
2007	Journeyman	"Friendly Skies"	Season 1, episode 2
2007	Journeyman	"A Love of a Lifetime"	Season 1, episode 1
2007	Shark	"Teacher's Pet"	Season 1, episode 13
2006	Shark	"Russo"	Season 1, episode 4
2005	North Shore	"Shark"	Season 1, episode 19
2004	North Shore	"Leverage"	Season 1, episode 13
2004	North Shore	"Meteor Shower"	Season 1, episode 4
2004	North Shore	"Surprise Party"	Season 1, episode 3
2003	The Lyon's Den	"Duty to Serve"	Season 1, episode 11
2003	The Lyon's Den	"Blood"	Season 1, episode 7
2003	The West Wing	"Angel Maintenance"	Season 4, episode 19
2003	The West Wing	"Guns Not Butter"	Season 4, episode 12
2002	The West Wing	"Swiss Diplomacy"	Season 4, episode 9
2002	The West Wing	"The Two Bartlets"	Season 3, episode 13
2001	The West Wing	"The Indians in the Lobby"	Season 3, episode 8
2001	The West Wing	"Ellie"	Season 2, episode 15
2000	The West Wing	"Galileo"	Season 2, episode 9
2000	The West Wing	"And It's Surely to Their Credit"	Season 2, episode 5
2000	Sports Night	"Draft Day: Part 2 – The Fall of Ryan O'Brian"	Season 2, episode 18
2000	Sports Night	"The Sweet Smell of Air"	Season 2, episode 12
1999	Sports Night	"The Reunion"	Season 2, episode 8
1999	Sports Night	"Teacher's Pet"	Season 2, episode 6
2000	Arli$$	"A Breed Apart"	Season 5, episode 9
1999	Arli$$		
1999	Arli$$	"Rules of the Game"	Season 4, episode 11
1999	Arli$$	"D-Day"	Season 4, episode 10
1999	Arli$$	"Taking One for the Team"	Season 4, episode 2
1998	Arli$$	"The American Game"	Season 3, episode 11
1998	Arli$$	"The Legacy"	Season 3, episode 6
1998	Arli$$	"My Job Is to Get Jobs"	Season 3, episode 2
1997	Arli$$	"The Truth and Responsibility"	Season 2, episode 10
1997	Arli$$	"Kirby Carlisle, Trouble-Shooter"	Season 2, episode 6
1997	Arli$$	"A Full-Service Agency"	Season 2, episode 1
1996	Arli$$	"Timing Is Everything"	Season 1, episode 9
1996	Arli$$	"Athletes Are Role Models"	Season 1, episode 3
