= Alexandra Breckenridge =

American actress (born 1982)

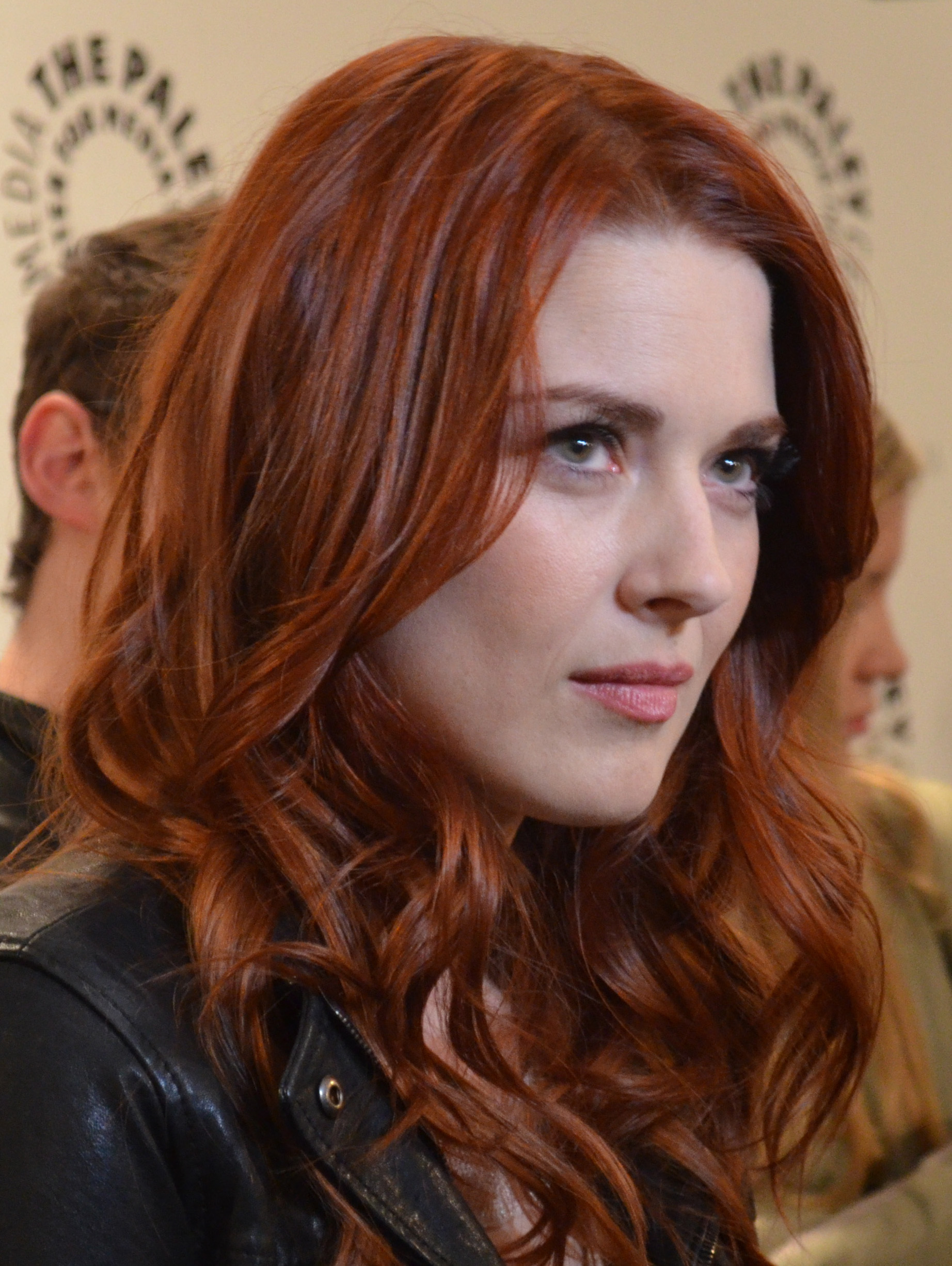
- Breckenridge in 2012
- Born: May 15, 1982 (age 44); Bridgeport, Connecticut, U.S.
- Other name: Alex Breckenridge
- Occupation: Actress
- Years active: 1998–present
- Spouse: Casey Hooper (m. 2015)
- Children: 2
- Relatives: Michael Weatherly (uncle)

Alexandra Breckenridge (born May 15, 1982) is an American actress. She began her career with supporting roles in the teen comedy films Big Fat Liar (2002) and She's the Man (2006). She later played reporter Willa McPherson in the FX series Dirt and had a supporting role in the short-lived series The Ex List. She starred as a young Moira O'Hara in the first season of FX's American Horror Story, and played Kaylee in the third season. She played Jessie Anderson in the AMC series The Walking Dead and Sophie in the NBC series This Is Us. She is also the voice of various characters in the animated comedy series Family Guy. Since 2019, she has starred as Melinda "Mel" Monroe in the Netflix series Virgin River.

== Early life ==
Breckenridge was born in Bridgeport, Connecticut, and lived in Darien, Connecticut, until the age of 10, when she and her mother moved to California, where they moved around for a year before settling in Mill Valley. She did community productions and took acting classes. At age 19, she had a job as a delivery driver for Big Wangs in Hollywood.

Her mother, who was 19 when Alexandra was born, went to college and was a house cleaner for a living. Her father worked at Foxwoods Casino as a director of operations for the engineering department.

== Career ==
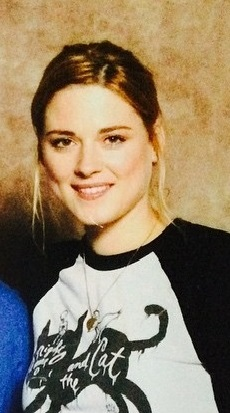
Breckenridge in 2015

In 2000, Breckenridge guest-starred as Shelly Weaver in Freaks and Geeks. She also guest-starred in Buffy the Vampire Slayer, Charmed, CSI: Crime Scene Investigation, Dawson's Creek, JAG, Medium, Psych, and Undeclared. Breckenridge also guest-starred as Francise in three episodes of Opposite Sex. In 2002, she appeared in the film Big Fat Liar, starring Frankie Muniz, as Jason Shepherd's older sister Janie.

Breckenridge has had numerous voice roles in the animated television series Family Guy. During an interview with FHM, she stated: "When I first went for Family Guy, I auditioned for a guest voice. I don't know why, but [creator] Seth MacFarlane really likes the sound of my voice. I'll never understand that. He just liked me and they call me back all the time to do different things." Breckenridge often does celebrity impressions in the series, such as Sarah Jessica Parker and Renée Zellweger. She also had roles in MacFarlane's web series Cavalcade of Cartoon Comedy. Breckenridge also guest-starred in the episode "With Friends Like Steve's" of American Dad!, also created by MacFarlane.

In 2006, Breckenridge starred as Monique in the film She's the Man. She has also appeared in two series that have later been canceled, such as the FX drama series Dirt from 2007 to 2008, in which she played Willa McPherson, a young upstart writer. In 2009, Breckenridge co-starred in the independent film The Bridge to Nowhere, directed by Blair Underwood. In 2012, she had a role in the film Ticket Out.

In 2011, Breckenridge had a recurring role in season four of HBO's True Blood as Katerina Pelham and also in season one of FX's American Horror Story as young Moira O'Hara, the ghost of a maid trapped in the house in which she was employed. In addition, she returned for two episodes in season three of the series, Coven, as Kaylee, a young witch who excels in pyrokinesis.

From 2015 to 2016, Breckenridge portrayed Jessie Anderson, a character from the comic book series of the same name, in seasons five and six of the AMC postapocalyptic horror series The Walking Dead. In 2015, she co-starred in the psychological thriller Dark from executive producer Joe Dante and director Nick Basile. In 2017, Breckenridge appeared in the recurring role of Sophie, Kate's childhood friend and Kevin's ex-wife, in the first season of the NBC drama series This Is Us. She was promoted to a series regular for the second season, and appeared in one episode in the third season two episodes in the fourth season, one episode in the fifth season, and the final sixth season.

Since 2019, Breckenridge has played lead character Melinda "Mel" Monroe, a nurse-midwife who moves to a small northern California town following a personal tragedy, in the Netflix series Virgin River. The series was renewed for fourth and fifth seasons by Netflix in September 2021.

== Personal life ==
Breckenridge married guitarist Casey Hooper in September 2015. They had their first child, a son, in September 2016. Their second child, a daughter, was born in December 2017. They reside in Georgia.

Breckenridge is the niece of actor Michael Weatherly.

She has several tattoos that are covered by make-up for her on-screen projects, but not during photo shoots.

== Filmography ==
=== Film ===
Year	Title	Role	Notes	Ref.
2002	Orange County	Anna	Uncredited role	
2002	Big Fat Liar	Janie Shepherd		
2002	Wishcraft	Kristie		
2002	Vampire Clan	Charity Lynn Keesee		
2003	D.E.B.S.	Amy	Short film	
2005	Rings	Vanessa	Short film	
2006	She's the Man	Monique Valentine		
2006	Jack Rabbit	Harley	Short film	
2008	The Art of Travel	Kate		
2009	The Bridge to Nowhere	Sienna		
2012	Ticket Out	Jocelyn		
2014	Other People's Children	Ariel		
2015	Always Watching: A Marble Hornets Story	Sara		
2015	Dark	Leah		
2015	Zipper	Christy		
2016	Broken Vows	Debra		
2017	Grown Ups	Carly	Short film	
2025	Cast Away Sorta	Herself	Short film	
2025	My Secret Santa	Taylor Jacobson		

=== Television ===
Year	Title	Role	Notes	Ref.
1998	Even the Losers	Unknown	Television film	
1998	Ghosts of Fear Street	Kit Murphy	Television film	
1999	Locust Valley	Arden	Television film	
2000	Dawson's Creek	Kate Douglas	Episode: "Valentine's Day Massacre"	
2000	Freaks and Geeks	Shelly Weaver	Episode: "Looks and Books"	
2000	Opposite Sex	Francise	Recurring role; 3 episodes	
2001–2002	Undeclared	Prim and Proper Girl / Celeste	Episodes: "Prototype" & "Eric's POV"	
2002	Charmed	Michelle Miglis	Episode: "A Paige from the Past"	
2002	Buffy the Vampire Slayer	Kit Holburn	Episode: "Lessons"	
2004	Mystery Girl	Katie Hill	Television short	
2004	CSI: Crime Scene Investigation	Lisa "Cleopatra" Hunt	Episode: "Turn of the Screws"	
2004	JAG	Pia Bonfilio	Episode: "There Goes the Neighborhood"	
2005	Murder Book	Sarah	Television film	
2005	Romy and Michele: In the Beginning	Michele Weinberger	Television film	
2005	Medium	Isabel Galvan	Episode: "Jump Start"	
2005	Sex, Love & Secrets	Maddie Lyall	Episode: "Protection"	
2005–2018	Family Guy	Various voices	Voice role; 65 episodes	
2006	American Dad!	Girl	Voice role; Episode: "With Friends Like Steve's"	
2007	Psych	Betty	Episode: "Scary Sherry: Bianca's Toast"	
2007–2008	Dirt	Willa McPherson	Main role; 20 episodes	
2008–2009	Seth MacFarlane's Cavalcade of Cartoon Comedy	Princess Peach / Woman	Voice role; 4 episodes	
2008–2009	The Ex List	Vivian	Main role; 13 episodes	
2010	Sons of Tucson	Gina	Episodes: "Gina" & "Ron Quits"	
2010	Life Unexpected	Abby Cassidy	Recurring role; 5 episodes	
2010	True Love	Erin	Unsold television pilot	
2011	Cooper and Stone	Jenna Cooper	Television film	
2011	Franklin & Bash	Emily Claire	Episode: "Bachelor Party"	
2011	True Blood	Katerina Pelham	Recurring role; 4 episodes (season 4)	
2011	American Horror Story: Murder House	Young Moira O'Hara	Recurring role; 6 episodes	
2012	Men at Work	Katelyn	Episode: "Wake and Bake"	
2013	Save Me	Carly Brugano	Main role; 7 episodes	
2013	American Horror Story: Coven	Kaylee Rowe	Episodes: "Fearful Pranks Ensue" & "The Axeman Cometh"	
2014	Rake	Brooke Alexander	Episode: "A Close Shave"	
2015–2016	The Walking Dead	Jessie Anderson	Recurring role (season 5), also starring (season 6); 11 episodes	
2015	Extant	Zoe Grant	Episode: "Morphoses"	
2016	Pure Genius	Margot Byer	Episode: "Pilot"	
2017–2018, 2020–2022	This Is Us	Sophie	Recurring role (season 1), Main role (season 2), Special guest star (seasons 3–6); 23 episodes	
2018	Law & Order: Special Victims Unit	Sarah Kent	Episode: "Mea Culpa"	
2018	Christmas Around the Corner	Claire	Television film	
2019–present	Virgin River	Melinda "Mel" Monroe Sheridan	Main role; 74 episodes (also producer)	
2020	Love in Store	Terrie Carpenter	Television film	

== Awards and nominations ==
Year	Association	Category	Nominated work	Result
2017	Screen Actors Guild Awards	Outstanding Performance by an Ensemble in a Drama Series	This Is Us	Won
2018	Screen Actors Guild Awards	Outstanding Performance by an Ensemble in a Drama Series	This Is Us	Won
