= Susan Kelechi Watson =

American actress

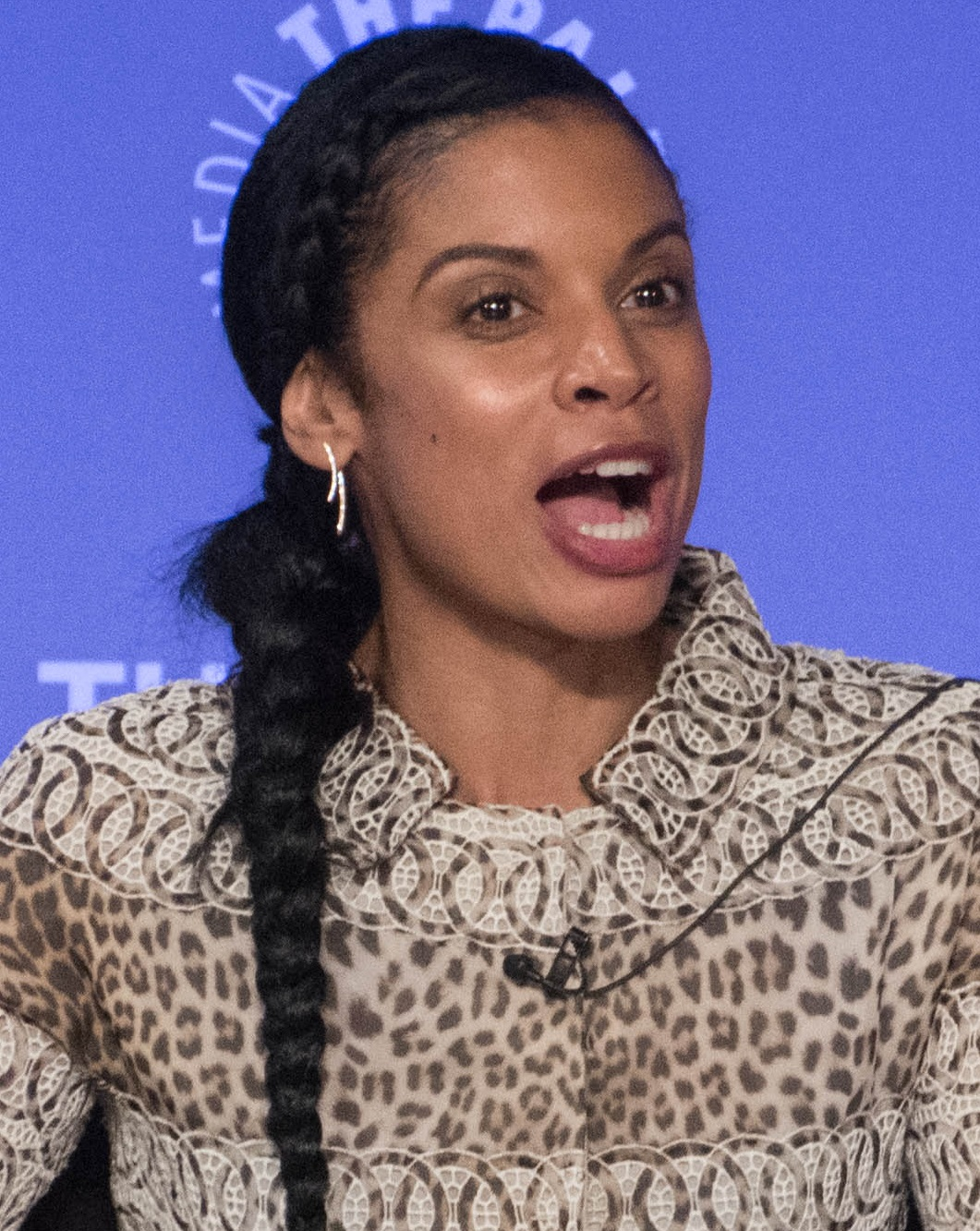
- Watson at the 2017 Paleyfest
- Born: November 11, 1981 (age 45); Brooklyn, New York, U.S.
- Education: Howard University (BFA); New York University (MFA)
- Occupation: Actress
- Years active: 2004–present

Susan Kelechi Watson (born November 11, 1981) is an American actress. She is known for her work on the television show Louie and for her role as Beth Pearson in This Is Us. She was nominated for the Critics' Choice Television Award for Best Supporting Actress in a Drama Series for the latter.

== Early life ==
Watson was born in Brooklyn on November 11, 1981. Her parents were born in Jamaica. Watson's middle name "Kelechi" means "Thank God" in Nigeria's Igbo language. Watson obtained a Bachelor of Fine Arts degree from Howard University and a Master of Fine Arts degree from the Tisch School of the Arts Graduate Acting Program.

== Career ==
Watson had a recurring role on the television show Louie from 2012 through 2014. She has had recurring roles on NCIS, The Following, and The Blacklist. She appeared in a play at the American Airlines Theatre in New York City by playwright Richard Greenberg entitled A Naked Girl on the Appian Way in 2005. From 2016 to 2022, she starred in the NBC drama series This Is Us as Beth Pearson.

Watson played Andrea Vogel in the Fred Rogers biopic A Beautiful Day in the Neighborhood alongside Tom Hanks in 2019. In September 2022, she appeared in the European premiere of Eureka Day at The Old Vic theatre in London.

== Filmography ==
=== Film ===
Year	Title	Role	Notes
2019	A Beautiful Day in the Neighborhood	Andrea Vogel	
2021	Rumble	Maggie (voice)	

=== Television ===
Year	Title	Role	Notes
2004	Hack	Paula	Episode: "Extreme Commerce"
2004	The Jury	Andrea Davis	Episode: "Lamentation on the Reservation"
2004–2005	Third Watch	Emma St. Claire	12 episodes
2005	Law & Order: Trial by Jury	Jill Tolbert	Episode: "Blue Wall"
2007	Medium	Subordinate	Episode: "Joe Day Afternoon"
2007	Kidnapped	Elle King	3 episodes
2007	Private Practice	Beth O'Brien	Episode: "In Which Sam Receives an Unexpected Visitor..."
2007	Alibi	Genevieve Egan	Television movie
2007–2008	NCIS	NCIS Intel Analyst Nikki Jardine	3 episodes
2008	Numb3rs	Nina Hunter	Episode: "Pay to Play"
2004, 2009	Law & Order	Tanya Ware / Thea Curry	Episodes: "Can I Get a Witness?", "The Drowned and the Saved"
2010	Futurestates	Tia	Episode: "Tia & Marco"
2011	Eden	Det. Monica Lopez	Episode: Pilot
2011	The Good Wife	Lauryn Fisher	Episode: "What Went Wrong"
2013	Golden Boy	April McGee	Episode: "Vicious Cycle"
2014	And, We're Out of Time	Diana	Television film
2012–2014	Louie	Janet	12 episodes
2014	Royal Pains	Naomi	Episode: "I Did Not See That Coming"
2013–2016	The Blacklist	Ellie	4 episodes
2014	The Following	Cindy	3 episodes
2015	Blue Bloods	Detective	Episode: "Sins of the Father"
2015	Veep	Sue's friend	Episode: "Election Night"
2015	Happyish	Sandy	Episode: "Starring Rene Descartes, Adweek and HRH the Princess of Arendelle"
2016	Billions	Wilma 'Billie' Keen	Episode: "YumTime"
2016	Limitless	Elo	Episode: "Fundamentals of Naked Portraiture"
2016–2022	This Is Us	Beth Pearson	Main role
2016	Divorce	Victoria Tuckson	Episode: "Counseling"
2021	Ada Twist, Scientist	Mom Twist (voice)	Main role
2022	Great Performances: Merry Wives	Madam Nkechi Ford	Episode: S49 Ep28
2024	Will Trent	Cricket Dawson	S2: Ep1 "Me Llamo Will Trent"
2025	The Residence	Jasmine Haney	Main role
2025	High Potential	Lucia	S2: Recurring Character
