= Kay Oyegun =

American writer, producer, and director

Kay Oyegun is a Nigerian born American writer, producer, and director. She is known for writing for This Is Us, of which she also produced and directed several episodes, and writing for Queen Sugar. She made her This Is Us directorial debut in the "Birth Mother" episode which aired on January 12, 2021.

Oyegun wrote the original script for Assisted Living, an upcoming Paramount movie which will mark Cardi B's debut in a leading movie role.

Oyegun served as a writer and executive producer on Apple TV's television series, Imperfect Women, starring Kerry Washington, Elisabeth Moss, Kate Mara, Joel Kinnaman, and Corey Stoll.

Kay will be making her feature directorial debut with the Lionsgate and Kingdom Story Company film, My Jesus, inspired by the life of country singer, Anne WIlson.

Oyegun has a bachelor's degree in Journalism from the University of Pittsburgh and an MFA in Producing from USC.
