= List of This Is Us episodes =

Listing of episodes for American television series This Is Us

This Is Us is an American television series created by Dan Fogelman for NBC. It follows the lives and families of two parents and their three children born on the same day as their father's birthday. The series stars an ensemble cast featuring Milo Ventimiglia, Mandy Moore, Sterling K. Brown, Chrissy Metz, Justin Hartley, Susan Kelechi Watson, Chris Sullivan, and Ron Cephas Jones. Jon Huertas, Alexandra Breckenridge, Niles Fitch, Logan Shroyer, Hannah Zeile, Mackenzie Hancsicsak, Parker Bates, Eris Baker, Faithe Herman, Lonnie Chavis, Melanie Liburd, Lyric Ross, Asante Blackk, Griffin Dunne, Caitlin Thompson, and Chris Geere joined the principal cast in later seasons. The series premiered on September 20, 2016.

In May 2019, NBC renewed the series through a sixth and final season. During the course of the series, 106 episodes of This Is Us aired over six seasons, concluding on May 24, 2022.

== Series overview ==
Season	Episodes	Originally released		Rank	Avg. viewership (inc. DVR) (in millions)
Season	Episodes	First released	Last released	Rank	Avg. viewership (inc. DVR) (in millions)
1	18	September 20, 2016	March 14, 2017	6	14.70
2	18	September 26, 2017	March 13, 2018	4	17.43
3	18	September 25, 2018	April 2, 2019	6	13.80
4	18	September 24, 2019	March 24, 2020	7	11.55
5	16	October 27, 2020	May 25, 2021	13	9.32
6	18	January 4, 2022	May 24, 2022	17	8.13

== Episodes ==
=== Season 1 (2016–17) ===
No. overall	No. in season	Title	Directed by	Written by	Original release date	Prod. code	U.S. viewers (millions)
1	1	"Pilot"	John Requa & Glenn Ficarra	Dan Fogelman	September 20, 2016	1AZC01	10.07
2	2	"The Big Three"	Ken Olin	Dan Fogelman	September 27, 2016	1AZC02	8.75
3	3	"Kyle"	John Requa & Glenn Ficarra	Dan Fogelman	October 11, 2016	1AZC03	9.87
4	4	"The Pool"	John Requa & Glenn Ficarra	Dan Fogelman & Donald Todd	October 18, 2016	1AZC04	9.71
5	5	"The Game Plan"	George Tillman	Joe Lawson	October 25, 2016	1AZC05	8.68
6	6	"Career Days"	Craig Zisk	Bekah Brunstetter	November 1, 2016	1AZC06	8.48
7	7	"The Best Washing Machine in the World"	Silas Howard	K.J. Steinberg	November 15, 2016	1AZC07	9.50
8	8	"Pilgrim Rick"	Sarah Pia Anderson	Isaac Aptaker & Elizabeth Berger	November 22, 2016	1AZC08	9.00
9	9	"The Trip"	Uta Briesewitz	Vera Herbert	November 29, 2016	1AZC09	10.53
10	10	"Last Christmas"	Helen Hunt	Donald Todd	December 6, 2016	1AZC10	10.95
11	11	"The Right Thing to Do"	Timothy Busfield	Aurin Squire	January 10, 2017	1AZC11	10.48
12	12	"The Big Day"	Ken Olin	Dan Fogelman & Laura Kenar	January 17, 2017	1AZC12	9.59
13	13	"Three Sentences"	Chris Koch	Joe Lawson & Bekah Brunstetter	January 24, 2017	1AZC13	9.63
14	14	"I Call Marriage"	George Tillman Jr.	Kay Oyegun	February 7, 2017	1AZC14	9.57
15	15	"Jack Pearson's Son"	Ken Olin	Isaac Aptaker & Elizabeth Berger	February 14, 2017	1AZC15	9.03
16	16	"Memphis"	John Requa & Glenn Ficarra	Dan Fogelman	February 21, 2017	1AZC16	9.35
17	17	"What Now?"	Wendey Stanzler	K.J. Steinberg & Vera Herbert	March 7, 2017	1AZC17	11.15
18	18	"Moonshadow"	Ken Olin	Dan Fogelman & Isaac Aptaker & Elizabeth Berger	March 14, 2017	1AZC18	12.84

=== Season 2 (2017–18) ===
No. overall	No. in season	Title	Directed by	Written by	Original release date	Prod. code	U.S. viewers (millions)
19	1	"A Father's Advice"	Ken Olin	Dan Fogelman	September 26, 2017	2AZC01	12.94
20	2	"A Manny-Splendored Thing"	John Fortenberry	Dan Fogelman & Bekah Brunstetter	October 3, 2017	2AZC02	11.06
21	3	"Déjà Vu"	John Requa & Glenn Ficarra	Isaac Aptaker & Elizabeth Berger	October 10, 2017	2AZC03	11.02
22	4	"Still There"	Ken Olin	Vera Herbert	October 17, 2017	2AZC04	10.65
23	5	"Brothers"	John Requa & Glenn Ficarra	Tyler Bensinger	October 24, 2017	2AZC05	10.60
24	6	"The 20's"	Regina King	Don Roos	October 31, 2017	2AZC06	8.43
25	7	"The Most Disappointed Man"	Chris Koch	Kay Oyegun	November 7, 2017	2AZC07	9.89
26	8	"Number One"	Ken Olin	K.J. Steinberg	November 14, 2017	2AZC08	10.05
27	9	"Number Two"	Ken Olin	K.J. Steinberg & Shukree Hassan Tilghman	November 21, 2017	2AZC09	9.34
28	10	"Number Three"	Ken Olin	Shukree Hassan Tilghman	November 28, 2017	2AZC10	10.94
29	11	"The Fifth Wheel"	Chris Koch	Vera Herbert	January 9, 2018	2AZC11	9.65
30	12	"Clooney"	Zetna Fuentes	Bekah Brunstetter	January 16, 2018	2AZC12	9.82
31	13	"That'll Be the Day"	Uta Briesewitz	Kay Oyegun & Don Roos	January 23, 2018	2AZC13	9.37
32	14	"Super Bowl Sunday"	John Requa & Glenn Ficarra	Dan Fogelman	February 4, 2018	2AZC14	26.97
33	15	"The Car"	Ken Olin	Isaac Aptaker & Elizabeth Berger	February 6, 2018	2AZC15	10.13
34	16	"Vegas, Baby"	Joanna Kerns	Laura Kenar	February 27, 2018	2AZC16	9.74
35	17	"This Big, Amazing, Beautiful Life"	Rebecca Asher	Kay Oyegun	March 6, 2018	2AZC17	8.90
36	18	"The Wedding"	Ken Olin	Isaac Aptaker & Elizabeth Berger	March 13, 2018	2AZC18	10.94

=== Season 3 (2018–19) ===
No. overall	No. in season	Title	Directed by	Written by	Original release date	Prod. code	U.S. viewers (millions)
37	1	"Nine Bucks"	Ken Olin	Dan Fogelman & Isaac Aptaker & Elizabeth Berger	September 25, 2018	3AZC01	10.54
38	2	"A Philadelphia Story"	Chris Koch	Kay Oyegun	October 2, 2018	3AZC02	8.87
39	3	"Katie Girls"	Rebecca Asher	Julia Brownell	October 9, 2018	3AZC03	8.91
40	4	"Vietnam"	Ken Olin	Dan Fogelman & Tim O'Brien	October 16, 2018	3AZC05	8.92
41	5	"Toby"	Chris Koch	K.J. Steinberg	October 23, 2018	3AZC04	8.53
42	6	"Kamsahamnida"	John Fortenberry	Vera Herbert	October 30, 2018	3AZC06	8.88
43	7	"Sometimes"	Ken Olin	Bekah Brunstetter	November 13, 2018	3AZC07	8.47
44	8	"Six Thanksgivings"	Catherine Hardwicke	Kevin Falls	November 20, 2018	3AZC08	7.91
45	9	"The Beginning Is the End Is the Beginning"	Ken Olin	Shukree Hassan Tilghman	November 27, 2018	3AZC09	8.98
46	10	"The Last Seven Weeks"	Roxann Dawson	Laura Kenar	January 15, 2019	3AZC10	7.74
47	11	"Songbird Road: Part One"	Chris Koch	Kevin Falls & Tim O'Brien	January 22, 2019	3AZC11	8.22
48	12	"Songbird Road: Part Two"	Ken Olin	Julia Brownell	February 12, 2019	3AZC12	7.40
49	13	"Our Little Island Girl"	Anne Fletcher	Eboni Freeman	February 19, 2019	3AZC13	7.55
50	14	"The Graduates"	Sarah Boyd	K.J. Steinberg & Danielle Bauman	March 5, 2019	3AZC14	7.82
51	15	"The Waiting Room"	Kevin Hooks	Bekah Brunstetter	March 12, 2019	3AZC15	7.74
52	16	"Don't Take My Sunshine Away"	George Tillman Jr.	Vera Herbert	March 19, 2019	3AZC16	7.64
53	17	"R & B"	Kevin Hooks	Kay Oyegun	March 26, 2019	3AZC17	7.63
54	18	"Her"	Ken Olin	Isaac Aptaker & Elizabeth Berger	April 2, 2019	3AZC18	8.22

=== Season 4 (2019–20) ===
No. overall	No. in season	Title	Directed by	Written by	Original release date	Prod. code	U.S. viewers (millions)
55	1	"Strangers"	Ken Olin	Dan Fogelman	September 24, 2019	4AZC01	7.88
56	2	"The Pool: Part Two"	Chris Koch	Isaac Aptaker & Elizabeth Berger	October 1, 2019	4AZC02	7.44
57	3	"Unhinged"	Anne Fletcher	Vera Herbert	October 8, 2019	4AZC03	7.25
58	4	"Flip a Coin"	Chris Koch	Julia Brownell	October 15, 2019	4AZC04	6.72
59	5	"Storybook Love"	Milo Ventimiglia	Casey Johnson & David Windsor	October 22, 2019	4AZC05	7.06
60	6	"The Club"	Jessica Yu	Kevin Falls	October 29, 2019	4AZC06	6.78
61	7	"The Dinner and the Date"	Ken Olin	Kay Oyegun	November 5, 2019	4AZC07	6.72
62	8	"Sorry"	Rebecca Asher	Elan Mastai	November 12, 2019	4AZC08	7.10
63	9	"So Long, Marianne"	Ken Olin	K.J. Steinberg	November 19, 2019	4AZC09	7.30
64	10	"Light and Shadows"	Yasu Tanida	Eboni Freeman	January 14, 2020	4AZC10	6.71
65	11	"A Hell of a Week: Part One"	Kevin Hooks	Jon Dorsey	January 21, 2020	4AZC11	6.59
66	12	"A Hell of a Week: Part Two"	Kevin Hooks	Danielle Bauman	January 28, 2020	4AZC12	6.42
67	13	"A Hell of a Week: Part Three"	Justin Hartley	Laura Kenar	February 11, 2020	4AZC13	6.40
68	14	"The Cabin"	Catherine Hardwicke	Isaac Aptaker & Elizabeth Berger	February 18, 2020	4AZC14	6.46
69	15	"Clouds"	Sarah Boyd	Kevin Falls & Jonny Gomez	February 25, 2020	4AZC15	6.98
70	16	"New York, New York, New York"	Ken Olin	Julia Brownell	March 10, 2020	4AZC16	5.62
71	17	"After the Fire"	Roxann Dawson	Vera Herbert & Kay Oyegun	March 17, 2020	4AZC17	7.07
72	18	"Strangers: Part Two"	Ken Olin	Dan Fogelman	March 24, 2020	4AZC18	7.96

=== Season 5 (2020–21) ===
No. overall	No. in season	Title	Directed by	Written by	Original release date	Prod. code	U.S. viewers (millions)
73	1	"Forty"	Ken Olin	Dan Fogelman & Kay Oyegun & Jake Schnesel	October 27, 2020	5AZC01	7.30
74	2	"Forty"	Ken Olin	Dan Fogelman & Kay Oyegun & Jake Schnesel	October 27, 2020	5AZC02	7.30
75	3	"Changes"	Anne Fletcher	Kevin Falls	November 10, 2020	5AZC03	6.85
76	4	"Honestly"	Ken Olin	Elan Mastai	November 17, 2020	5AZC04	6.57
77	5	"A Long Road Home"	Anne Fletcher	K.J. Steinberg	January 5, 2021	5AZC05	5.20
78	6	"Birth Mother"	Kay Oyegun	Eboni Freeman & Kay Oyegun	January 12, 2021	5AZC06	5.45
79	7	"There"	Kevin Rodney Sullivan	Isaac Aptaker & Elizabeth Berger	February 9, 2021	5AZC07	5.12
80	8	"In the Room"	Ken Olin	Vera Herbert	February 16, 2021	5AZC08	5.76
81	9	"The Ride"	Jon Huertas	Julia Brownell	February 23, 2021	5AZC09	5.10
82	10	"I've Got This"	Ken Olin	Casey Johnson & David Windsor	March 16, 2021	5AZC10	5.00
83	11	"One Small Step ..."	Yasu Tanida	Laura Kenar	March 23, 2021	5AZC11	5.15
84	12	"Both Things Can Be True"	Chris Koch	Danielle Bauman	April 6, 2021	5AZC12	4.53
85	13	"Brotherly Love"	Kay Oyegun	Jon Dorsey	April 13, 2021	5AZC13	4.81
86	14	"The Music and the Mirror"	Jessica Yu	Jonny Gomez	May 11, 2021	5AZC14	5.08
87	15	"Jerry 2.0"	Milo Ventimiglia	Isaac Aptaker & Elizabeth Berger	May 18, 2021	5AZC15	4.90
88	16	"The Adirondacks"	Ken Olin	Dan Fogelman	May 25, 2021	5AZC16	5.14

=== Season 6 (2022) ===
No. overall	No. in season	Title	Directed by	Written by	Original release date	Prod. code	U.S. viewers (millions)
89	1	"The Challenger"	Ken Olin	Dan Fogelman	January 4, 2022	6AZC01	5.46
90	2	"One Giant Leap"	Kay Oyegun	Kevin Falls	January 11, 2022	6AZC02	5.01
91	3	"Four Fathers"	Jon Huertas	Casey Johnson & David Windsor	January 18, 2022	6AZC03	4.91
92	4	"Don't Let Me Keep You"	Jessica Yu	Elan Mastai	January 25, 2022	6AZC04	4.76
93	5	"Heart and Soul"	Chris Sullivan	Julia Brownell	February 1, 2022	6AZC05	4.54
94	6	"Our Little Island Girl: Part Two"	Kevin Hooks	Susan Kelechi Watson & Eboni Freeman	February 22, 2022	6AZC06	4.39
95	7	"Taboo"	Glenn Steelman	Laura Kenar	March 8, 2022	6AZC07	4.24
96	8	"The Guitar Man"	Milo Ventimiglia	Kevin Falls & Jake Schnesel	March 15, 2022	6AZC08	4.18
97	9	"The Hill"	Mandy Moore	Casey Johnson & David Windsor & Chrissy Metz	March 22, 2022	6AZC09	4.45
98	10	"Every Version of You"	Justin Hartley	Kay Oyegun	March 29, 2022	6AZC10	4.21
99	11	"Saturday in the Park"	Chris Koch	K.J. Steinberg	April 5, 2022	6AZC11	4.74
100	12	"Katoby"	Ken Olin	Isaac Aptaker & Elizabeth Berger	April 12, 2022	6AZC12	4.56
101	13	"Day of the Wedding"	James Takata	Jon Dorsey	April 19, 2022	6AZC13	5.09
102	14	"The Night Before the Wedding"	Yasu Tanida	Danielle Bauman	April 26, 2022	6AZC14	4.93
103	15	"Miguel"	Zetna Fuentes	Jonny Gomez	May 3, 2022	6AZC15	4.67
104	16	"Family Meeting"	Chris Koch	Isaac Aptaker & Elizabeth Berger	May 10, 2022	6AZC16	4.80
105	17	"The Train"	Ken Olin	Dan Fogelman	May 17, 2022	6AZC17	5.32
106	18	"Us"	Ken Olin	Dan Fogelman	May 24, 2022	6AZC18	6.37

== Ratings ==
This Is Us : U.S. viewers per episode (millions)

Season	Episode number																		Average
Season	1	2	3	4	5	6	7	8	9	10	11	12	13	14	15	16	17	18	Average
1	10.07	8.75	9.87	9.71	8.68	8.48	9.50	9.00	10.53	10.95	10.48	9.59	9.63	9.57	9.03	9.35	11.15	12.15	9.84
2	12.94	11.06	11.02	10.65	10.60	8.43	9.89	10.05	9.34	10.94	9.65	9.82	9.37	26.97	10.13	9.74	8.90	10.94	11.14
3	10.54	8.87	8.91	8.92	8.53	8.88	8.47	7.91	8.98	7.74	8.22	7.40	7.56	7.82	7.74	7.64	7.36	8.22	8.32
4	7.88	7.44	7.25	6.72	7.06	6.76	6.72	7.10	7.30	6.71	6.59	6.42	6.40	6.46	6.98	5.62	7.07	7.96	6.91
5	7.30	7.30	6.85	6.57	5.20	5.45	5.12	5.76	5.10	5.00	5.15	4.53	4.81	5.08	4.90	5.14	–		5.58
6	5.46	5.01	4.91	4.76	4.54	4.39	4.24	4.18	4.45	4.21	4.74	4.56	5.09	4.93	4.67	4.80	5.32	6.37	4.81

Audience measurement performed by Nielsen Media Research
