= List of Super Bowl lead-out programs =

The Super Bowl is the annual championship game of the National Football League (NFL), and is typically the highest-rated single television broadcast in the United States of any given year. As such, the television network that broadcasts the game will typically use it as a tent-pole for another program, airing following the conclusion of the game telecast, to take advantage of and retain the expanded audience.

The lead-out program is typically a highly anticipated special episode or a season premiere of an existing primetime program (such as a flagship drama, sitcom, or reality series), or in some cases, the premiere of a new series. Occasionally, the lead-out has been another sporting event.

In many cases, the local markets of the participating teams may preempt the lead-out program, delay airing the lead-out program until after late local news, or move it to an alternate channel to air local postgame coverage after the network concludes its coverage.

== Overview ==
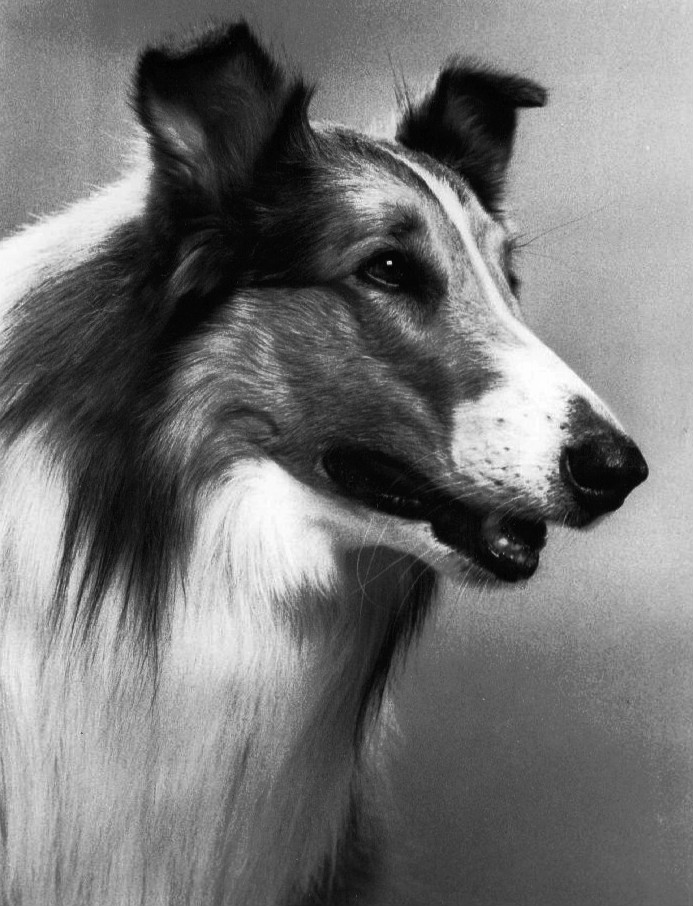
Lassie was a frequent lead-out program during the early years of the Super Bowl when the game was broadcast on CBS (1967 after Super Bowl I, 1968 after Super Bowl II, and 1970 after Super Bowl IV).

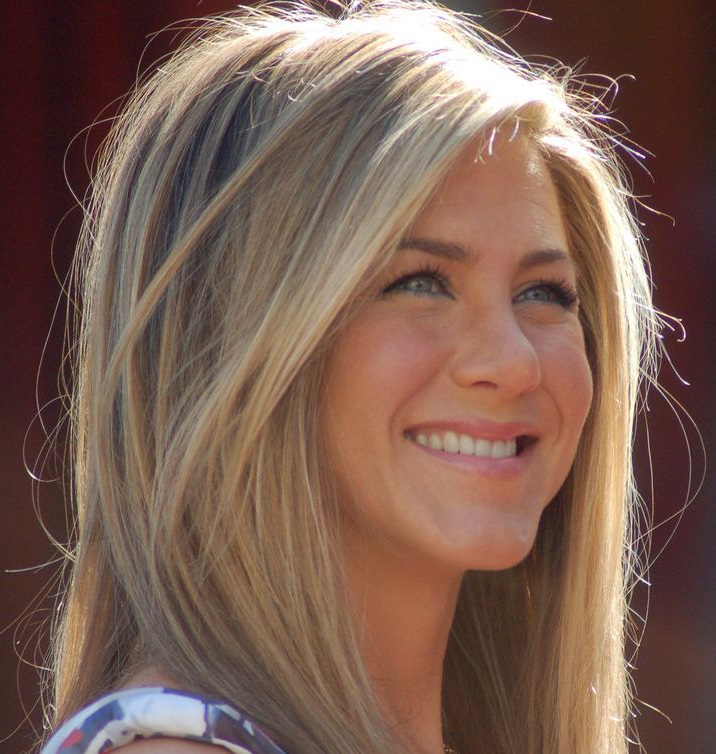
The episode of Friends, starring Jennifer Aniston (pictured), titled "The One After the Superbowl" which aired following Super Bowl XXX became the highest rated Super Bowl lead-out program in history, a distinction it still holds.

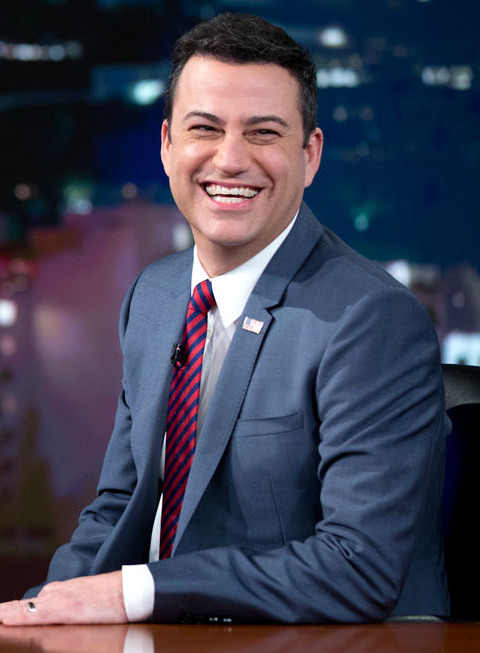
The Super Bowl lead-out time slot has occasionally been used by networks to debut new series. Among such shows is ABC's Jimmy Kimmel Live! in 2003 following Super Bowl XXXVII.

The Super Bowl provides an extremely strong lead-in to the programming on the channel following the game, the effects of which can last for several hours. For instance, in discussing the ratings of a local television station, Buffalo, New York television critic Alan Pergament noted on the coattails from Super Bowl XLVII, which aired on CBS affiliate WIVB-TV, stating that a paid program that aired on the station at 2:30 in the morning had a 1.3 rating, which was higher than some of The CW's programming aired on WIVB's sister station, WNLO-TV.

The Super Bowl lead-out is typically aired across most U.S. markets simultaneously, and is usually one hour in length, although before the game adopted its standard start time of just after 6:00 p.m. ET in the early 1990s, it was not uncommon for longer programs to be broadcast. When the game moved into a later time slot in 1983, the game and its associated post-game programming would be scheduled until 10:00 p.m. Eastern Time / 7:00 p.m. Pacific Time, allowing for only one hour of network programming until local news. Outside of the few blowout games through the game's history, these programs never have started anywhere near the mentioned time, due to the extended length of the pre-game, halftime, and post-game festivities. Viewership for ABC's airing of Alias in 2003 after Super Bowl XXXVII was dampened by an unusually-long 40-minute post-game show (which featured a performance by Bon Jovi prior to the trophy presentation), which the episode was moved to after 11:00 p.m. ET. Although a series high, the episode was one of the lowest-rated Super Bowl lead-outs at the time. At Super Bowl LVIII, the series premiere of Tracker was delayed to 11:14 p.m. ET due to the game's overtime finish (which made it the longest Super Bowl game to-date), but CBS did achieve 18.4 million viewers.

It is common for affiliates in the home markets of the competing teams to delay the lead-out show further, until after additional local post-game coverage (though in 2018, despite the Philadelphia Eagles's win, NBC's Philadelphia station WCAU chose to carry post-game coverage to their Cozi TV subchannel while This Is Us aired on the main channel as scheduled then moved its postgame coverage back to WCAU at 11 p.m. once NBC's programming ended, to reduce viewer inconvenience).

In 1979, 1999, 2010, and 2017, and largely from the mid-1980s through the mid-1990s, this slot was used to showcase a new series or movie, such as The A-Team or The Wonder Years, or broadcast a special episode of an "up-and-coming" series. However, many of the series were ultimately unsuccessful, with some being canceled within a matter of weeks. Since then, virtually all of the programs in the post-game timeslot have been special episodes of series that had already aired for at least one season.

The most recent Super Bowl lead-out program to have also been a series premiere is Tracker, which followed CBS's broadcast of Super Bowl LVIII in 2024. A previous example, Undercover Boss (which was launched following Super Bowl XLIV on CBS) attracted the largest peak half-hour viewership of any Super Bowl lead-out program to date, with 75.474 million viewers. Four other series aired their season premieres following the Super Bowl: two editions of Survivor, the Australian and all-star series (which followed Super Bowls XXXV and XXXVIII), which aired on CBS, The Voice, which launched its second season following Super Bowl XLVI on NBC, and The Masked Singer, which launched its third season after Super Bowl LIV on Fox.

Although Fox almost never programs time slots after 10:00 p.m. except on Saturdays (instead encouraging its affiliates to air local news in the slot), Fox has aired lead-out programming after the Super Bowl ever since it began airing the game in 1997, which normally preempts local newscasts. The Fox affiliates in the market of the winning team sometimes air a post-Super Bowl newscast immediately following the game and delay the lead-out program until after the newscast's conclusion; two such examples included New York flagship O&O WNYW (after the New York Giants won Super Bowl XLII) and Boston affiliate WFXT (after the New England Patriots won Super Bowl LI).

In recent years, a regular-length episode of a drama series would usually air, although in some cases a one-hour episode of a sitcom (normally 30 minutes in length), or two episodes of different sitcoms paired together, may air instead. Quite often the selected series is one of the "prestige" shows for the network showing the game that year, or a moderate hit (such as Friends and 3rd Rock from the Sun on NBC,The X-Files on Fox, Criminal Minds on CBS, or Grey's Anatomy on ABC), which the network wants to give a higher profile. The Simpsons has aired in the slot twice, with both airings being paired with the premieres of animated sitcoms (Family Guy in 1999, and American Dad! in 2005). An occasional practice used to maximize the effect of the lead-out is to make the Super Bowl episode a cliffhanger, with a story that concludes later in the week in the program's regularly scheduled timeslot (e.g. 3rd Rock from the Sun in 1998, Grey's Anatomy in 2006, The Blacklist in 2015, and High Potential in 2027).

Rarely, and especially before the game moved to a 6:00 p.m. start time, the lead-out has been another sporting event; until the 21st century, the last Super Bowl to have a sporting event as a lead-out was Super Bowl X in 1976, which was followed by final round coverage of the Phoenix Open golf tournament. Beginning in 2022, NBC has aired primetime coverage of the Winter Olympics as its lead-out; CBS agreed to swap Super Bowl LVI to NBC so that their coverage of 2022 Winter Olympics would not be cannibalize viewership of the Super Bowl on a competing network, while the current NFL media rights through 2033 (which add ABC to the Super Bowl rights rotation, expanding it to four networks) gives NBC the Super Bowl games in Winter Olympic years over the length of the contract, including 2026 (LX), 2030 (LXIV), and 2034 (LXVIII).

It has also been rare for a Super Bowl leadout program to be a made-for-television movie, as was the case of Raid on Entebbe following Super Bowl XI and Brotherhood of the Rose following Super Bowl XXIII.

Because the Super Bowl is on a Sunday, before the mid-2000s, networks never carried a new episode of their weeknight late night talk shows after the game, lead-out program and local news. However this has changed since then, usually after late local programming, in order to give those programs an additional promotional push to introduce the current generation of hosts (who have been more willing to promote their series on more than a traditional Monday-to-Friday schedule, and have had a wider audience via internet video than their predecessors). This was first done with the live premiere episode of Jimmy Kimmel Live! after Super Bowl XXXVII in 2003, followed by The Late Late Show with Craig Ferguson after Super Bowl XLI in 2007. Late Night with Jimmy Fallon was next to follow in 2012 after Super Bowl XLVI, finishing a week of shows recorded from Indianapolis. Ferguson aired a special episode from New Orleans after Super Bowl XLVII in 2013. In 2015, Jimmy Fallon had another new episode after Super Bowl XLIX from Phoenix, this time as the host of The Tonight Show. In 2016, for Super Bowl 50, CBS aired a special live episode of The Late Show with Stephen Colbert as its lead-out, followed by a special episode of The Late Late Show with James Corden after late local programming. Fallon then hosted another episode after Super Bowl LII in Minneapolis. Colbert followed suit in subsequent years that CBS aired the game.

The most common lead-out program is the news magazine 60 Minutes, which has aired after four Super Bowls (VI, XIV, XVI, XXVI). Lassie was the lead-out show three times (I, II, IV) and three series have appeared in the time slot twice, The Wonderful World of Disney (I, VII), The Simpsons (XXXIII, XXXIX) and Survivor (XXXV, XXXVIII). Likewise, the Winter Olympics have twice served as the lead-out program (LVI, LX).

Occasionally, especially if they are not the Super Bowl broadcaster, a network may also choose to air a special lead-out after other NFL playoff games with a similar prime time window, such as the divisional games or conference championships.

== List of lead-out programs in the United States ==
The following is a list of shows that have aired after the Super Bowl:

Super Bowl	Date	Network	Program	Episode	Start time (ET)	U.S. viewers (millions)	Share	Refs
I	January 15, 1967	CBS	Lassie	"Lassie's Litter Bit"	—	—	33.7%	
I	January 15, 1967	NBC	Walt Disney's Wonderful World of Color	"Willie and the Yank: The Mosby Raiders" (Part II)	—	—	25.3%	
II	January 14, 1968	CBS	Local programming, then Lassie	"The Foundling"	—	—	41.2%	
III	January 12, 1969	NBC	G.E. College Bowl		—	—	21.2%	
IV	January 11, 1970	CBS	Lassie	"The Road Back"		—	34%	
V	January 17, 1971	NBC	Bing Crosby National Pro-Am golf tournament		—		36%	
VI	January 16, 1972	CBS	60 Minutes		—		36%	
VII	January 14, 1973	NBC	The Wonderful World of Disney	"The Mystery in Dracula's Castle"		—	44%	
VIII	January 13, 1974	CBS	Local programming, then The New Perry Mason	"The Case of the Tortured Titan"	—	15.058	20%	
IX	January 12, 1975	NBC	NBC Nightly News		—	15.924	28%	
X	January 18, 1976	CBS	Phoenix Open golf tournament		—	22.363	31%	
XI	January 9, 1977	NBC	The Big Event	Kit Carson	—	42.816	37%	
XII	January 15, 1978	CBS	All in the Family	"Super Bowl Sunday"	—	35.472	47%	
XIII	January 21, 1979	NBC	Brothers and Sisters	"Pilot"	—	31.722	32%	
XIV	January 20, 1980	CBS	60 Minutes		—	40.746	50%	
XV	January 25, 1981	NBC	CHiPs	"11-99: Officer Needs Help" (originally aired January 18, 1981)	—		26%	
XVI	January 24, 1982	CBS	60 Minutes		—		36%	
XVII	January 30, 1983	NBC	The A-Team	"Children of Jamestown" (first regular episode)	—	21.910	39%	
XVIII	January 22, 1984	CBS	Airwolf	"Shadow of the Hawke" (two-hour pilot)	—	27.874	36%	
XIX	January 20, 1985	ABC	MacGruder and Loud	"Pilot"	—		38%	
XX	January 26, 1986	NBC	The Last Precinct	"The Last Precinct" (pilot)	—	39.729	25%	
XXI	January 25, 1987	CBS	Hard Copy (Note: A short lived drama series, not be confused with the 1989–99 tabloid television show.)	Pilot	—		33%	
XXII	January 31, 1988	ABC	The Wonder Years	Pilot	—	28.976	31%	
XXIII	January 22, 1989	NBC	Brotherhood of the Rose	(part 1 of 2)	—	32.0	36%	
XXIV	January 28, 1990	CBS	Grand Slam	"Pilot"	—	30.765	30%	
XXV	January 27, 1991	ABC	Davis Rules	"A Man for All Reasons" (pilot)	10:05 PM – 11:05 PM	26.695	25%	
XXVI	January 26, 1992	CBS	60 Minutes	60 Minutes was an abbreviated 13-minute edition and was apparently a last-minute addition to the schedule, consisting of an interview of Bill and Hillary Clinton addressing the Gennifer Flowers affair.	10:34 PM	24.821	30%	
XXVI	January 26, 1992	CBS	48 Hours		10:47 PM – 11:47 PM	24.821	30%	
XXVII	January 31, 1993	NBC	Homicide: Life on the Street	"Gone for Goode" (pilot)	10:15 PM – 11:15 PM	28.121	31%	
XXVIII	January 30, 1994	NBC	The John Larroquette Show	"Eggs"	10:00 PM – 10:30 PM	17.708	22%	
XXVIII	January 30, 1994	NBC	The Good Life	Pilot	10:30 PM – 11:00 PM	23.012	22%	
XXIX	January 29, 1995	ABC	Extreme	Pilot	10:30 PM – 11:30 PM	22.594	25%	
XXX	January 28, 1996	NBC	Friends	"The One After the Superbowl" (one-hour episode)	10:30 PM – 11:30 PM	52.925	46%	
XXXI	January 26, 1997	Fox	The X-Files	"Leonard Betts"	9:30 PM – 10:30 PM	29.098	29%	
XXXII	January 25, 1998	NBC	3rd Rock from the Sun	"36! 24! 36! Dick" (Part One; one-hour episode)	10:30 PM – 11:30 PM	33.662	34%	
XXXIII	January 31, 1999	Fox	Family Guy	"Death Has a Shadow" (pilot)	10:30 PM – 11:00 PM	22.005	21%	
XXXIII	January 31, 1999	Fox	The Simpsons	"Sunday, Cruddy Sunday"	11:00 PM – 11:30 PM	22.005	21%	
XXXIV	January 30, 2000	ABC	The Practice	"New Evidence" (part 1)	10:18 PM – 11:18 PM	23.847	27%	
XXXV	January 28, 2001	CBS	Survivor: The Australian Outback	"Stranded" (season premiere)	10:19 PM – 11:19 PM	45.369	39%	
XXXVI	February 3, 2002	Fox	Malcolm in the Middle	"Company Picnic" (one-hour episode)	10:38 PM – 11:38 PM	21.445	21%	
XXXVII	January 26, 2003	ABC	Alias	"Phase One"	11:15 PM – 12:15 AM	17.362	20%	
XXXVIII	February 1, 2004	CBS	Survivor: All-Stars	"They're Back!" (season premiere)	10:58 PM – 11:58 PM	33.535	32%	
XXXIX	February 6, 2005	Fox	The Simpsons	"Homer and Ned's Hail Mary Pass"	10:45 PM – 11:18 PM	23.074	22%	
XXXIX	February 6, 2005	Fox	American Dad!	Pilot	11:18 PM – 11:48 PM	23.074	22%	
XL	February 5, 2006	ABC	Grey's Anatomy	"It's the End of the World"	10:05 PM – 11:05 PM	37.800	27%	
XLI	February 4, 2007	CBS	Criminal Minds	"The Big Game"	10:20 PM – 11:20 PM	26.314	26%	
XLII	February 3, 2008	Fox	House	"Frozen"	10:30 PM – 11:30 PM	29.045	27%	
XLIII	February 1, 2009	NBC	The Office	"Stress Relief" (one-hour episode)	10:45 PM – 11:45 PM	22.905	21%	
XLIV	February 7, 2010	CBS	Undercover Boss	"Waste Management" (series premiere)	10:15 PM – 11:15 PM	38.654	32%	
XLV	February 6, 2011	Fox	Glee	"The Sue Sylvester Shuffle"	10:35 PM – 11:45 PM	26.796	25%	
XLVI	February 5, 2012	NBC	The Voice	"The Blind Auditions, Part 1" (season premiere)	10:15 PM – 11:15 PM	37.611	31%	
XLVII	February 3, 2013	CBS	Elementary	"The Deductionist"	11:15 PM – 12:15 AM	20.800	23%	
XLVIII	February 2, 2014	Fox	New Girl	"Prince"	10:23 PM – 10:54 PM	26.30	20%	
XLVIII	February 2, 2014	Fox	Brooklyn Nine-Nine	"Operation: Broken Feather"	10:54 PM – 11:25 PM	15.07	13%	
XLIX	February 1, 2015	NBC	The Blacklist	"Luther Braxton" (part 1)	10:38 PM – 11:38 PM	25.72	24%	
50	February 7, 2016	CBS	The Late Show with Stephen Colbert	Guests: Tina Fey, Margot Robbie, Will Ferrell, Megyn Kelly, Keegan-Michael Key, Jordan Peele	10:54 PM – 11:54 PM	20.55	25%	
LI	February 5, 2017	Fox	24: Legacy	"12:00 PM – 1:00 PM" (series premiere)	11:00 PM – 12:00 AM	17.58	22%	
LII	February 4, 2018	NBC	This Is Us	"Super Bowl Sunday"	10:45 PM – 11:45 PM	26.98		
LIII	February 3, 2019	CBS	The World's Best	Auditions 1 (series premiere)	10:36 PM – 11:36 PM	22.21		
LIV	February 2, 2020	Fox	The Masked Singer	"The Season Kick off Mask Off: Group A" (season premiere)	10:40 PM – 11:40 PM	27.33		
LV	February 7, 2021	CBS	The Equalizer	"The Equalizer" (series premiere)	10:39 PM – 11:39 PM	20.40		
LVI	February 13, 2022	NBC	2022 Winter Olympics	"2022 Winter Olympics Primetime Show" (events: women's monobob and ice dance)	10:24 PM – 11:39 PM	24.00		
LVII	February 12, 2023	Fox	Next Level Chef	"A Next Level Welcome" (season premiere)	10:37 PM – 11:47 PM	15.66		
LVIII	February 11, 2024	CBS	Tracker	"Klamath Falls" (series premiere)	11:14 PM – 12:14 AM	18.44		
LVIII	February 11, 2024	Nickelodeon (alternate broadcast)	Rock Paper Scissors	"The Fart Joke Debate" and "The First Lou Episode"	10:54 PM – 11:24 PM	N/A		
LIX	February 9, 2025	Fox	The Floor (Note: The lead-out slot after Super Bowl LIX was originally planned to have an episode of Rescue: HI-Surf, but the show was removed from the schedule in November 2024 due to low ratings. The third season premiere of The Floor was scheduled in its place.)	Season 3 premiere	10:41 PM – 11:51 PM	13.94		
LIX	February 9, 2025	Tubi	The Z-Suite	Series premiere (Note: The series had already premiered on Tubi three days prior, but was aired as the lead-out as to "re-premiere" the series.)	10:30 PM	N/A		
LX	February 8, 2026	NBC	2026 Winter Olympics	Primetime in Milan (events: alpine skiing, women's downhill and figure skating, team event)	10:46 PM–12:01 AM	20.02		
LXI	February 14, 2027	ABC/Disney+	High Potential	TBD	TBD	TBD	TBD	
LXI	February 14, 2027	ESPN	TBD	TBD	TBD	TBD	TBD	
LXII	February 13, 2028	CBS	TBD	TBD	TBD	TBD	TBD	
LXIII	February 11, 2029	Fox	TBD	TBD	TBD	TBD	TBD	
LXIV	February 10, 2030	NBC	TBD	TBD	TBD	TBD	TBD	

== Lead-outs in Canada ==
The Canadian broadcast rightsholder to the Super Bowl which airs the game in simulcast with the U.S. broadcaster (CTV since 2008) can air the same lead-out program as long as it owns domestic rights to the program airing as the lead-out of the U.S. broadcaster (such as, for example, Super Bowl LIV, since CTV is the Canadian broadcaster of The Masked Singer). If not, then it will instead air its own specific lead-out program for the Canadian audience as a substitute.

For example, after Super Bowl XLV, CTV aired the season finale of its original drama Flashpoint following the conclusion of the telecast, as the rights to Glee were held by Global. In turn, Global counterprogrammed the game with a "Sue-Per Bowl Sunday" theme night to tie into the episode, which included episodes of Glee, and the Glee-themed episodes of The Simpsons ("Elementary School Musical") and The Office ("Viewing Party").

CTV originally scheduled a "sneak peek" of the second season of its original sitcom Spun Out after Super Bowl XLIX, but it was pulled and replaced by the season 2 premiere of MasterChef Canada after cast member J. P. Manoux was charged with voyeurism; the premiere of season 2 of Spun Out was postponed to July 14, 2015.

Programs marked in bold were the same as the U.S. Super Bowl lead-out, either broadcast in a simulcast with the U.S. network, or via a clean feed.

Super Bowl	Date	Network	Program	Episode	Notes
XL	February 5, 2006	Global	Family Guy	Encore episode	
XLI	February 4, 2007	Global	Deal or No Deal Canada	Series premiere	
XLII	February 3, 2008	CTV	Nip/Tuck	"Carly Summers" (season premiere) (Note: The episode was first shown in the U.S. on cable network FX on October 30, 2007, but CTV postponed the start of the season until after the Super Bowl.)	
XLIII	February 1, 2009	CTV	The Mentalist	"Red Brick and Ivy" (Note: The episode was first shown in the U.S. on CBS on December 16, 2008.)	
XLIV	February 7, 2010	CTV	**Undercover Boss**	"Waste Management" (series premiere)	
XLV	February 6, 2011	CTV	Flashpoint	"Fault Lines (Part 1)" (season 3 finale)	
XLVI	February 5, 2012	CTV	**The Voice**	"The Blind Auditions, Part 1" (season 2 premiere)	
XLVII	February 3, 2013	CTV	Motive	"Creeping Tom" (series premiere)	
XLVIII	February 2, 2014	CTV	MasterChef Canada	"First Kick at the Box"	
XLIX	February 1, 2015	CTV	MasterChef Canada	"Fit to Be Tied" (season 2 premiere) (Note: NBC's broadcast of The Blacklist interrupted local programming on Global, once the CTV coverage of the game ended.)	
50	February 7, 2016	CTV	DC's Legends of Tomorrow	"White Knights" (world premiere episode) (Note: The episode did not air in the U.S. on The CW until its normal Thursday timeslot.)	
LI	February 5, 2017	CTV/CTV 2 TSN (Note: With the exception of Super Bowl LIII as the lead-out show was brought by CTV competitor Citytv, TSN has split from the simulcast following the game, usually airing a postgame edition of SportsCentre or SC with Jay and Dan / with Jay Onrait.)	Letterkenny	"Ain't No Reason to Get Excited" (broadcast television premiere)	
LII	February 4, 2018	CTV/CTV 2 TSN	**This Is Us**	"Super Bowl Sunday"	
LIII	February 3, 2019	CTV/CTV 2 TSN	SC with Jay and Dan (Note: CTV, CTV2 and TSN split from the CBS network coverage to air a postgame edition of SportsCentre live from Toronto, with the CBS network feed instead interrupting local programming on Citytv.)	Post-game edition	
LIV	February 2, 2020	CTV; TSN	**The Masked Singer**	Season 3 premiere	
LV	February 7, 2021	CTV; TSN	Holmes Family Effect	"A Trade of a Lifetime" (series premiere)	
LVI	February 13, 2022	CTV; TSN	Children Ruin Everything	"Roadtrips"	
LVII	February 12, 2023	CTV; TSN	**Next Level Chef**	Season 2 premiere	
LVIII	February 11, 2024	CTV; TSN	**Tracker**	"Klamath Falls" (series premiere)	
LIX	February 9, 2025	CTV; TSN	Rescue: HI-Surf (Note: On December 12, 2024, CTV announced that the Rescue: HI-Surf episode which was originally scheduled to air on Fox after the Super Bowl would retain the postgame timeslot on CTV. Canadian rights to The Floor are held by Global, which three days prior said it would not air the episode until March 30. Eventually, Season 3 began on Global on March 5, at 10/9c.)	"Depth Charge" (world premiere episode) (Note: The episode did not air in the U.S. on Fox until its normal Monday timeslot.)	
LX	February 8, 2026	CTV; TSN	The Borderline	"Blue Beetle" (pilot episode) (Note: Subsequent episodes will be available on Crave on Fridays from February 13)	
