= This Is Us season 2 =

Season of television series This Is Us

This Is Us
- Season 2
- Promotional poster
- Starring: Milo Ventimiglia; Mandy Moore; Sterling K. Brown; Chrissy Metz; Justin Hartley; Susan Kelechi Watson; Chris Sullivan; Jon Huertas; Alexandra Breckenridge; Niles Fitch; Logan Shroyer; Parker Bates; Hannah Zeile; Mackenzie Hancsicsak; Eris Baker; Faithe Herman; Lonnie Chavis; Ron Cephas Jones
- No. of episodes: 18

Release
- Original network: NBC
- Original release: September 26, 2017 – March 13, 2018

Season chronology
- ← Previous; Season 1 Next → Season 3

The second season of the American television series This Is Us continues to follow the lives and connections of the Pearson family across several time periods. The season was produced by Rhode Island Ave. Productions, Zaftig Films, and 20th Century Fox Television, with Dan Fogelman, Isaac Aptaker, and Elizabeth Berger serving as showrunners.

A second and third season of This Is Us were ordered in January 2017, with production for season two beginning that July. The season stars an ensemble cast featuring Milo Ventimiglia, Mandy Moore, Sterling K. Brown, Chrissy Metz, Justin Hartley, Susan Kelechi Watson, Chris Sullivan, Ron Cephas Jones, Jon Huertas, Alexandra Breckenridge, Niles Fitch, Logan Shroyer, Hannah Zeile, Mackenzie Hancsicsak, Parker Bates, Eris Baker, Faithe Herman, and Lonnie Chavis.

The second season, consisting of 18 episodes, aired from September 26, 2017, to March 13, 2018, on NBC. This Is Us served as the lead-out program for Super Bowl LII in February 2018 with the second season's fourteenth episode.

== Cast and characters ==
=== Main ===
- Milo Ventimiglia as Jack Pearson
- Mandy Moore as Rebecca Pearson
- Sterling K. Brown as Randall Pearson
  - Niles Fitch as teenage Randall Pearson
  - Lonnie Chavis as young Randall Pearson
- Chrissy Metz as Kate Pearson
  - Hannah Zeile as teenage Kate Pearson
  - Mackenzie Hancsicsak as young Kate Pearson
- Justin Hartley as Kevin Pearson
  - Logan Shroyer as teenage Kevin Pearson
  - Parker Bates as young Kevin Pearson
- Susan Kelechi Watson as Beth Pearson
- Chris Sullivan as Toby Damon
- Jon Huertas as Miguel Rivas
- Alexandra Breckenridge as Sophie
- Eris Baker as Tess Pearson
- Faithe Herman as Annie Pearson
- Ron Cephas Jones as William H. "Shakespeare" Hill

=== Recurring ===
- Jermel Nakia as young adult William H. "Shakespeare" Hill
- Ron Howard as himself, the director in Kevin's movie.
- Lyric Ross as Deja Andrews, Randall and Beth's foster child.
- Debra Jo Rupp as Linda, a social worker who works with Randall and Beth when they foster Deja.
- Caitlin Thompson as Madison, Kate's group's resident thin member, who Kate discovers is bulimic.
- Joy Brunson as Shauna Andrews, Deja's mother.

=== Guest ===
- Sylvester Stallone as himself, an actor in Kevin's movie.
- Peter Onorati as Stanley Pearson
- Sam Anderson as Walter Crowder, the judge in young adult William Hill's case.
- Delroy Lindo as Ernest Bradley, the judge in Randall's adoption case.
- Kate Burton as Barbara, a psychologist at Kevin's rehab who facilitates his meeting with the family.
- Garrett Morris as Lloyd, a resident of William's old apartment building.
- Iantha Richardson as adult Tess Pearson, a social worker.
- Gerald McRaney as Dr. Nathan Katowski (aka Dr. K), Rebecca's former childbirth obstetrician.
- Susan Blakely as Anne, Dr. K's wife.
- Pam Grier as G. G., Shauna's grandmother and Deja's great-grandmother.
- Dan Lauria as Mr. Damon, Toby's father.
- Wendie Malick as Mary Damon, Toby's mother.
- Melanie Liburd as Zoe Baker, Beth's cousin.

== Episodes ==
No. overall	No. in season	Title	Directed by	Written by	Original release date	Prod. code	U.S. viewers (millions)
19	1	"A Father's Advice"	Ken Olin	Dan Fogelman	September 26, 2017	2AZC01	12.94
On the Big Three's 37th birthday, Randall wants to adopt a baby, but Beth convinces him they can honor William's legacy by adopting an older child. Kate leaves an audition because all the other women there are thin, but she returns to go through with it. She is rejected because of her inexperience, not her weight; Kate is confident she can work her way up. Toby tells Kevin that he, not Kevin, needs to be Kate's "person." Kevin explains that Kate informed him of their father's death, and being Kate's brother is the only thing he is really good at. In the past, Rebecca takes the Big Three to a movie after her argument with Jack. Rebecca urges Jack to come home; Jack admits his drinking is out of control. Later, the family house has burned and Rebecca, in the car with Jack's possessions in a bag, screams and cries.
20	2	"A Manny-Splendored Thing"	John Fortenberry	Dan Fogelman & Bekah Brunstetter	October 3, 2017	2AZC02	11.06
The young Big Three prepare for a school talent show. Rebecca calls Kate the family's "greatest singer," but Kate overhears Rebecca's superior ability and abandons her plan to sing. Only Sophie enjoys Kevin's poor Mr. T impression. Kate reassures Jack, who turns to a punching bag to avoid drinking. Years later, teenage Kate reassures Jack after he admits his alcoholism problem; he lets Rebecca take him to an AA meeting. In the present, Kevin appears in the 100th episode of The Manny. The writer gives him deliberately humiliating material, but Sophie focuses him on completing the job. The other Pearsons fly in for the taping. Randall admits to Beth that he worries about fostering an older child who could have major issues. Kevin tells Beth that Randall only risked failure once: in asking her out. Beth reassures Randall they will succeed, and they tell their daughters about their intentions. Kate gets her first gig, filling in with a bar's house band. Kate sings well, then tells Rebecca that her exaggerated praise is insincere and demoralizing. Rebecca seeks support from Toby, but he sides with Kate, winning Rebecca's approval.
21	3	"Déjà Vu"	John Requa & Glenn Ficarra	Isaac Aptaker & Elizabeth Berger	October 10, 2017	2AZC03	11.02
In flashbacks, when the kids are teenagers, Jack talks about his efforts to rehabilitate from alcoholism. Randall tries to find his birth parents through an ad, and is comforted by Kate and Kevin after a woman falsely claims to be his birth mother. In the present, Kate attends Kevin's movie set. Excited that Sylvester Stallone is his co-star, Kate bonds with Stallone and tells him what his films meant to Jack. After talking with Stallone, Kevin's memories of his dad surface, affecting his performance in a scene. Randall learns that a young girl, Deja, is being brought to his home. Later, when Deja yells at Beth for "stealing" her mom's cigarettes, Randall defends his wife, and Deja shrinks to defend herself from apparent aggression. Randall talks to Deja about the joy he found in having Jack and Rebecca, as well as William. Kevin takes pain medication after his old football knee injury is reinjured during the filming of a battle scene.
22	4	"Still There"	Ken Olin	Vera Herbert	October 17, 2017	2AZC04	10.65
Young Kate and Kevin have chicken pox, and Randall reluctantly agrees to deliberately contract it. Against Rebecca's objections, her mother Janet arrives and is snowed in with the Pearsons. Janet is judgmental, socially tone-deaf, and ostracizes Randall. Rebecca confronts Janet, calls her a racist, and demands she leave as soon as possible; Randall overhears. Despite having also gotten sick, Jack rallies to shovel Janet's car out so she can leave immediately. Janet admits she can't help feeling differently about Randall, but she takes an interest in his science fair project and acknowledges he is special. In the present, Randall takes his daughters and Deja bowling, but Deja's unwashed hair leads to a fight with another girl. Beth realizes Deja is suffering alopecia from stress; Deja allows Beth to wash and braid her hair. Randall invites Deja to run with him to combat stress; Deja understands Beth shared their conversation with him, and cuts the braids off. Kevin undergoes surgery on his injured knee; reluctant to take painkillers, he does so to maintain his movie's production schedule. Kate is six weeks pregnant but hasn't told Toby.
23	5	"Brothers"	John Requa & Glenn Ficarra	Tyler Bensinger	October 24, 2017	2AZC05	10.60
Kate and Toby share news of her pregnancy. Kevin, set to be auctioned off by Sophie for a large-scale charity event she is hosting, gets drunk while trying to get a pain medication prescription; he misses the auction, embarrassing Sophie. Randall earns Deja's trust. In the past, when Jack takes 10-year-old Kevin and Randall camping, Rebecca learns that Jack's father is dying. She calls Jack, but his past issues with his father combined with his focus on making sure Kevin gets along with Randall keep Jack from returning. Rebecca reassures Jack's father (who sees his granddaughter, Kate) that Jack is a great father and husband. Kevin finds a notebook where Randall wrote reminders to himself on how to keep the peace between them, motivating him to be nice to Randall. Later, Jack looks at a picture of him and his brother in the army. During Jack's childhood, he and his never-before-seen brother await their father's return to the car as he gets drunk at a bar.
24	6	"The 20's"	Regina King	Don Roos	October 31, 2017	2AZC06	8.43
In flashbacks, with the 10-year-old Big Three, Rebecca takes Randall trick-or-treating while Jack takes Kate and Kevin to a haunted house. Randall learns about Kyle's death from the neighbors; Rebecca then tells him the facts of his adoption. Flashbacks in 2009 depict the Big Three in their twenties. Kate, working as a waitress, finds out she is involved with a married man. Kevin, desperate for work as an actor, attempts to steal a role from his roommate and best friend. Kate and Kevin commiserate about their deadbeat lives and decide to live together. Randall and Beth prepare for the arrival of their first daughter. Beth unexpectedly goes into labor after agreeing to help Rebecca create a Facebook account. With no time to get to the hospital, Randall helps Beth through a home delivery. When Rebecca posts a photo of her granddaughter on Facebook, she receives a message from Miguel, who is hoping to reconnect.
25	7	"The Most Disappointed Man"	Chris Koch	Kay Oyegun	November 7, 2017	2AZC07	9.89
Jack and Rebecca prepare to finalize Randall's adoption when Randall is a year old. Their case worker gives a glowing recommendation, but their judge is against interracial adoption. After reading Rebecca's letter about being Randall's mother, the judge recuses himself; the new judge grants the adoption. Concurrently, William pleads guilty to a drug charge. Although the judge is disappointed because William had a clean record, William claims to be more disappointed due to the loss of his loved ones and son. The judge visits William in jail, offering to reduce the sentence and get him help if he stays sober. William keeps this promise for 30-odd years until hearing his cancer is terminal. As he is about to use, Randall introduces himself as William's biological son. In the present, Randall takes Deja to visit her mother Shauna in prison, but Shauna declines the visit. Randall later talks to Shauna, who intends to take Deja back after her release. He lets Shauna call Deja. Kevin's relationship with Sophie deteriorates as he continues abusing pain medication and alcohol. Kate and Toby announce their pregnancy to Kevin and plan to get married at city hall, but then reconsider having a big wedding.
26	8	"Number One"	Ken Olin	K.J. Steinberg	November 14, 2017	2AZC08	10.05
In flashbacks, baby Kevin walks first. Teenage Kevin disrespects a Pitt football recruiter, causing Jack to scold Kevin. As Jack speaks with his sponsor and recites the serenity prayer, Kevin remains flippant, but Jack apologizes to Kevin. A game injury ends Kevin's football prospects while Jack and Randall are away at a college tour. Jack comes to the hospital and assures Kevin that he has other talents and will find his purpose. Kevin apologizes for his attitude, and Jack gives him a pendant, symbolizing "purpose," given to him in Vietnam at a personal low point. Jack says Kevin is his purpose. Present-day Kevin, exhausted by substance abuse, is an honored alumnus at his high school. His football coach introduces him; Kevin imagines Jack giving the speech. Kevin declares himself unworthy of his award. He pantomimes football on the field, giving play-by-play commentary on his failures. He has sex with fellow honoree Charlotte, a doctor, and uses her prescription pad to create a forgery, but quickly leaves a pharmacy after noticing he lost his pendant. Thinking he left it in Charlotte's house, Kevin returns, but she refuses to let him inside; he collapses, begging for help. The next day, Kevin visits Randall, who assumes Kevin's desire to talk concerns Kate's miscarriage.
27	9	"Number Two"	Ken Olin	K.J. Steinberg & Shukree Hassan Tilghman	November 21, 2017	2AZC09	9.34
In flashbacks, baby Kate walks second. Teenage Kate bonds with the dog, Louie. Kate seems unconcerned with college applications, but Rebecca is pleased to discover Kate's application for Berklee. At Kevin's game, Kate accepts Rebecca's praise just as Kevin is injured. At the hospital, Kate admits she feared disappointing Rebecca; Rebecca acknowledges their emotional distance, but is ready to support Kate when needed. Kate watches her parents embrace. Present-day Kate focuses on her prenatal care with Toby, but she miscarries. Kate leaves a singing gig, overcome at seeing a family; she loads a buffet plate, but leaves it untouched. Toby works frantically to avert the delivery of a baby bath. At home, Kate blames Toby for getting her excited about the baby; she tells Toby that the miscarriage didn't happen to him, but he asserts that he shares their loss. Rebecca arrives and Kate accepts her support. Kate admits feeling she hurt Toby by miscarrying; Rebecca shares that concealing her grief over Kyle's death from Jack led her to a breakdown in a supermarket after six weeks. Kate tells Toby how she feels and they agree to try again soon; they reaffirm their love.
28	10	"Number Three"	Ken Olin	Shukree Hassan Tilghman	November 28, 2017	2AZC10	10.94
In flashbacks, baby Randall walks third. Teenage Randall and Jack attend a tour at Howard University. Randall tells Jack that others' reactions make him feel "off balance" as the only black family member. Jack shows Randall the Vietnam Veterans Memorial, and admits he felt off balance when he returned from the war. Jack believes Randall will find balance and be "spectacular." They return to Pittsburgh to a hospitalized Kevin; Jack admits monitoring all three children is difficult. In the present, the charges against Shauna are dropped; Randall and Beth consider fighting for custody. Randall recalls William's account of following Rebecca home after her second visit; he realized Randall had a full life without him and left. Randall observes Shauna preparing for Deja's homecoming and realizes Deja's home is with Shauna; Beth agrees. Shauna takes Deja home, and Randall offers to be available to Deja for help no matter what. Randall and Beth agree to foster again; a young boy is seen meeting with his social worker. Kevin arrives at Randall's, but leaves quickly after drinking vodka. Kevin speeds down the highway; Tess, hidden in the back seat, admonishes him. Kevin gets arrested for drunk driving.
29	11	"The Fifth Wheel"	Chris Koch	Vera Herbert	January 9, 2018	2AZC11	9.65
When the kids are 10, Jack takes the family for a cabin vacation, picking up Kevin after football camp. Randall's new glasses are missing. Rebecca notices Kate's food obsession; Jack has her exercise, but takes her for ice cream. During a thunderstorm, Kevin brings Randall's glasses to their parents' room where Kate and Randall are sleeping. He sleeps on the floor. Present-day Toby finds junk-food trash. Tess tells her parents she was sad when Deja had to leave. The family visits Kevin at rehab. Kevin apologizes to the family, but Barbara, the facilitator, also has him discuss family issues. Kevin says they are a family of addicts and that he always felt like the "fifth wheel" growing up: Kate had Jack's support and Rebecca loved Randall more than Kevin. Randall scolds Kevin, and Rebecca tearfully says Randall was easier to love. Toby, Beth and Miguel meet at a bar and discuss being outsiders. After the session, the Big Three reconcile. Kate admits to Toby about hiding junk food since miscarrying. Rebecca tells Kevin why she never worried about him and states that they had their moments; in the flashback, Rebecca joins Kevin on the floor.
30	12	"Clooney"	Zetna Fuentes	Bekah Brunstetter	January 16, 2018	2AZC12	9.82
Jack and Rebecca take the teenage Big Three shopping for suits and dresses for the winter formal. Randall asks a redheaded girl out. Though the teenagers are almost starting college, Jack again wants to start "Big Three Homes", which he put aside to support his family. In the present, William's stray cat "Clooney" wanders. After rehab, Kevin stays with Rebecca and Miguel. Miguel later tells Kevin that Jack and Rebecca were a unified couple, not individuals; he did not love Rebecca while Jack was alive, but does now and is staying. Kate befriends Madison from their support group; they go wedding dress shopping and Kate discovers Madison's bulimia. Madison later faints and calls Kate for help. Kate says losing weight as a teenager did not make her happy. Randall visits Beth at work; she says working again would help him. Randall gets William's box from storage, searches for a lady about whom William wrote and drew, and discovers it was a mural of Billie Holiday. Randall tells Beth he wants to buy and manage the run-down building with her. In a flashback, Jack and Rebecca forget to buy smoke detector batteries.
31	13	"That'll Be the Day"	Uta Briesewitz	Kay Oyegun & Don Roos	January 23, 2018	2AZC13	9.37
Around 1980, an elderly couple sort their junk, including a jukebox that plays "That'll Be the Day." When their house gets a buyer, the man gives his neighbor, Jack, a slow cooker with a tricky switch. In 1998, Jack and Rebecca watch the Super Bowl alone as the teenagers are otherwise occupied; Kevin is with Sophie, Randall is on a date, and Kate is making a music college audition tape (which Jack videotapes, to Kate's initial disapproval). In the present, Randall and Beth buy William's old building. Kevin helps Randall do repairs; they soon find themselves overwhelmed by bugs, and the building is vacated when an exterminator is called. When Toby looks up dogs on the internet, Kate—with mixed feelings—adopts a dog. Kevin tries to make amends to Sophie. He cries upon receiving his missing pendant in the mail, knowing that he cannot make amends to his dad. In 1998, the old slow cooker's faulty switch causes a house fire.
32	14	"Super Bowl Sunday"	John Requa & Glenn Ficarra	Dan Fogelman	February 4, 2018	2AZC14	26.97
In 1998, Jack evacuates Rebecca, Kate and Randall from the burning house, then retrieves Kate's dog and family mementos. Jack, hospitalized for smoke inhalation, dies suddenly of cardiac arrest, to Rebecca’s shock. She tells Miguel, Randall, and Kate; Kate tells Kevin, who is away at a party. On the 20th anniversary of Jack's death, Kate's VCR damages the audition tape Jack recorded and saved from the fire, which she watches cathartically, blaming herself. Toby gets the tape repaired and digitized. Kate tells Toby that he strengthens her and that Jack would have loved him. Kevin visits Jack's memorial tree, admitting he has not lived up to Jack's legacy, but pledging to make him proud. Rebecca makes Jack's favorite lasagna and bonds with Kevin. Randall holds a Super Bowl party to commemorate Jack, but is emotional when the family's new pet lizard dies. Tess admits trying to prevent social workers from calling, fearing recent changes mean Randall wants a "new life." He reassures her he will always be devoted to her; she is happy the family participates in fostering. Deja unexpectedly arrives; Randall and Beth comfort her. The boy seen earlier is placed with a couple; the social worker is an adult Tess, whom an older Randall meets for dinner.
33	15	"The Car"	Ken Olin	Isaac Aptaker & Elizabeth Berger	February 6, 2018	2AZC15	10.13
Jack buys a costly Wagoneer because his young children love it. The Pearsons, going to see "Weird Al" Yankovic, slowly cross a bridge that Rebecca fears. When Rebecca faces a cancer scare, Jack drives Rebecca, who is awaiting MRI results, to his "favorite tree". Rebecca turns out to be fine, as Jack anticipated. The brothers fight during Randall's driving lesson; Jack exhorts them to be close like him and his brother, who died in Vietnam. Jack drives Kate to Alanis Morissette's autograph session; they compare Morissette with Bruce Springsteen. Rebecca drives the teenagers to Jack's funeral, stalking the urn because she was not in Jack's room when he died. Dr. K and his second wife attend the funeral, where he tells Rebecca that Jack often sought his advice and she has always been strong. Kate decides to give away her dog; Rebecca affirms that Jack's death is not Kate's fault because Jack made his own decisions. The brothers bicker over manly duties, but they make peace when Rebecca tells them to remain teenagers. The Pearsons scatter Jack's ashes at the tree, but Kate keeps some. Jack had purchased Springsteen tickets, so Rebecca drives the family to the concert, overcoming her fear and crossing the bridge.
34	16	"Vegas, Baby"	Joanna Kerns	Laura Kenar	February 27, 2018	2AZC16	9.74
Jack and Rebecca celebrate their early wedding anniversaries—she, with small thoughtful gifts; he, with grand romantic gestures. The children, age 10, plan a romantic anniversary celebration, including an attempted dinner and culminating in observing a meteor shower. Rebecca decides they should always celebrate their anniversary. In the present, Toby and Kate hold their bachelor and bachelorette parties in Las Vegas. Kevin, Randall, Beth, and others attend; Toby has no close male friends and Kate and Beth are not close. Kevin maintains his sobriety, despite struggling when learning his film scenes may have been cut. Weeks after providing Deja money for Shauna's utility bill, Randall worries about Deja; Beth wants to move on, resulting in them arguing. Kate tries to mediate, revealing she feels Beth replaced her in Randall's life; Kate explains she was closest to Randall during part of their youth. Beth admits her love for Deja hurts in her absence. Toby supports Kevin and Randall, saying his own brother never desired a close relationship. Ron Howard tells Kevin his great work is still in the movie. When returning home, Beth decides she and Randall should visit Deja; they find her and Shauna living in a car.
35	17	"This Big, Amazing, Beautiful Life"	Rebecca Asher	Kay Oyegun	March 6, 2018	2AZC17	8.90
Flashbacks show other characters' experiences paralleling Deja's. 16-year-old Shauna gives birth to Deja, and Shauna's grandmother G.G. urges Shauna towards accountability. Three years later, G.G. financially supports Shauna. G.G. dies, leading to Shauna depending on Deja. Adolescent Deja injures herself cooking Shauna's birthday dinner; Deja is removed from the home. Stress drives Shauna to drug use and Deja stays in the foster system. Deja and her foster sister Raven, after shoplifting, are removed from a physically abusive foster father's home; Raven is willing to endure the abuse if it means stability. Deja returns to Shauna; Shauna's mooching boyfriend Lonzo brings a gun into the home and Deja's alopecia begins amid the adults' fighting. The gun is found in Shauna's car, after which Deja begins living with the Pearsons, returning to Shauna once the charges are dropped. Shauna breaks up with Lonzo, but spends her and Deja's savings to bail him out of jail. Deja attempts to raise money, but decides not to pawn G.G.'s brooch, resulting in Shauna and Deja being evicted for unpaid rent. Randall and Beth take in Shauna and Deja. Deja concludes that the human experience is universal. Shauna believes she deprived Deja of a childhood and decides to leave Deja with the Pearsons.
36	18	"The Wedding"	Ken Olin	Isaac Aptaker & Elizabeth Berger	March 13, 2018	2AZC18	10.94
As Kate's wedding approaches, her recurring dream of Jack and Rebecca renewing their vows on their 40th wedding anniversary does not include Toby. After unsuccessfully seeking "something old" connected to Jack, Kate makes room in her heart for Toby by resolving her grief over Jack; she scatters the remainder of Jack's ashes near the Pearson cabin. Kate tells Rebecca she admires her. Toby's divorced parents disapprove of the marriage, fearing a relapse of the depression Toby suffered after his first marriage; Toby demands they celebrate the wedding or leave, so they stay to celebrate. Kate and Toby marry; Jack once told Kate she would someday marry a man better than himself. Kevin allows himself to grieve over Jack. Deja is surly after Shauna requests termination of parental rights; Beth's cousin Zoe, the wedding photographer, consoles Deja by sharing how she accepted Beth's family’s love after her own mother abandoned her. However, after Toby's mother says Deja resembles Randall, Deja vandalizes Randall's car. In the future, Kevin (contemplating Jack and Nicky’s Vietnam War picture) and Zoe fly to Vietnam together while Kate nurses a cripplingly depressed Toby. Further in the future, Randall and an adult Tess feel unprepared to see an unnamed female.

== Production ==
=== Development ===
On January 18, 2017, NBC renewed the series for a second and third season of 18 episodes each, for a total of 36 additional episodes. Dan Fogelman, Isaac Aptaker, and Elizabeth Berger served as the season's showrunners.

=== Casting ===
Main cast members Milo Ventimiglia, Mandy Moore, Sterling K. Brown, Chrissy Metz, Justin Hartley, Susan Kelechi Watson, Chris Sullivan, and Ron Cephas Jones returned from the first season as Jack Pearson, Rebecca Pearson, Randall Pearson, Kate Pearson, Kevin Pearson, Beth Pearson, Toby Damon, and William H. Hill, respectively. Jon Huertas and Alexandra Breckenridge, who recurred as Miguel and Sophie, respectively, throughout the first season, were subsequently promoted to the principal cast in the second season. Also promoted to series regulars are young actors Hannah Zeile as teenage Kate, Niles Fitch as teenage Randall, Logan Shroyer as teenage Kevin, Mackenzie Hancsicsak as young Kate, Parker Bates as young Kevin, Faithe Herman as Annie Pearson, and Eris Baker as Tess Pearson. Due to his conflicting role on White Famous, Lonnie Chavis (young Randall) was unable to be promoted to a series regular, but is credited with the main cast in episodes in which he appears.

In August 2017, Sylvester Stallone and Debra Jo Rupp were cast in guest starring roles.

=== Filming ===
The show was awarded over $9.9 million in tax incentives by the California Film Commission for its second season. Production on the season began on July 11, 2017, in Los Angeles.

== Release ==
=== Broadcast ===
The second season was originally set to move to a Thursday timeslot, to anchor a new Must See TV lineup, alongside Will & Grace, Great News and Law & Order True Crime: The Menendez Murders, with NBC chairman Bob Greenblatt explaining, "While this is a bit risky, there is a bigger case to be made about redoing Thursday night. If there is one show we could move, it would be this one." However, on May 30, 2017, NBC decided to keep the series on Tuesdays at 9 pm EST, allowing it a run of 10 uninterrupted original episodes in the fall.

The season aired from September 26, 2017, to March 13, 2018, on NBC in the United States, and on CTV in Canada. This Is Us served as the lead-out program for Super Bowl LII on February 4, 2018.

== Reception ==
=== Critical response ===
The review aggregator website Rotten Tomatoes reported a 91% approval rating, with an average rating of 7.95/10, and an average episode score of 92%, based on 23 reviews. The website's consensus reads, "This is Us continues to tug at heartstrings with an emotional exploration of family that ensures viewers will want to keep the tissues close -- and their loved ones closer."

This Is Us season 2: Critical reception by episode
Season 2 (2017–18): Percentage of positive critics' reviews tracked by the website Rotten Tomatoes

=== Ratings ===
Viewership and ratings per episode of This Is Us season 2
No.	Title	Air date	Rating/share (18–49)	Viewers (millions)	DVR (18–49)	DVR viewers (millions)	Total (18–49)	Total viewers (millions)
1	"A Father's Advice"	September 26, 2017	3.9/13	12.94	2.6	6.93	6.5	19.87
2	"A Manny-Splendored Thing"	October 3, 2017	3.1/11	11.06	2.4	6.15	5.5	17.21
3	"Déjà Vu"	October 10, 2017	2.8/10	11.02	2.2	6.11	5.0	17.13
4	"Still There"	October 17, 2017	2.9/10	10.65	2.3	6.32	5.2	16.97
5	"Brothers"	October 24, 2017	2.8/10	10.60	2.2	6.09	5.0	16.69
6	"The 20's"	October 31, 2017	2.0/7	8.43	2.4	6.50	4.4	14.94
7	"The Most Disappointed Man"	November 7, 2017	2.5/9	9.89	2.3	6.28	4.8	16.17
8	"Number One"	November 14, 2017	2.6/9	10.05	2.2	6.10	4.8	16.15
9	"Number Two"	November 21, 2017	2.5/9	9.34	2.0	5.71	4.5	15.05
10	"Number Three"	November 28, 2017	2.8/10	10.94	2.0	5.65	4.8	16.60
11	"The Fifth Wheel"	January 9, 2018	2.7/9	9.65	2.3	6.34	5.0	15.99
12	"Clooney"	January 16, 2018	2.5/9	9.82	2.5	6.35	5.0	16.18
13	"That'll Be the Day"	January 23, 2018	2.5/9	9.37	2.6	7.10	5.2	16.58
14	"Super Bowl Sunday"	February 4, 2018	9.3/32	26.97	2.3	6.44	11.6	33.40
15	"The Car"	February 6, 2018	2.7/10	10.13	2.2	6.03	4.9	16.16
16	"Vegas, Baby"	February 27, 2018	2.5/9	9.74	2.0	5.65	4.5	15.39
17	"This Big, Amazing, Beautiful Life"	March 6, 2018	2.3/8	8.90	2.3	6.57	4.6	15.67
18	"The Wedding"	March 13, 2018	2.8/10	10.94	2.1	6.13	4.9	17.07

=== Accolades ===
Year	Award	Category	Recipient(s) and nominee(s)	Result	Ref.
2018	NAACP Image Awards	Outstanding Drama Series	This Is Us	Nominated	
2018	NAACP Image Awards	Outstanding Actor in a Drama Series	Sterling K. Brown	Nominated	
2018	NAACP Image Awards	Outstanding Supporting Actress in a Drama Series	Susan Kelechi Watson	Nominated	
2018	NAACP Image Awards	Outstanding Writing in a Drama Series	Vera Herbert for "Still There"	Nominated	
2018	NAACP Image Awards	Outstanding Performance by a Youth	Lonnie Chavis	Nominated	
