= This Is Us season 1 =

Season of television series This Is Us

This Is Us
- Season 1
- DVD cover
- Starring: Milo Ventimiglia; Mandy Moore; Sterling K. Brown; Chrissy Metz; Justin Hartley; Susan Kelechi Watson; Chris Sullivan; Ron Cephas Jones
- No. of episodes: 18

Release
- Original network: NBC
- Original release: September 20, 2016 – March 14, 2017

Season chronology
- Next → Season 2

The first season of the American television series This Is Us follows the lives and families of two parents and their three children born on the same day as their father's birthday. The season is produced by Rhode Island Ave. Productions, Zaftig Films, and 20th Century Fox Television, with Fogelman and Don Todd serving as showrunners.

The season stars an ensemble cast featuring Milo Ventimiglia, Mandy Moore, Sterling K. Brown, Chrissy Metz, Justin Hartley, Susan Kelechi Watson, Chris Sullivan, and Ron Cephas Jones.

The season, which premiered on NBC on September 20, 2016, and ran until March 14, 2017, over 18 episodes, received generally positive reviews from critics. It was chosen by the American Film Institute as one of the top ten television programs of 2016, and received ten nominations for the 69th Primetime Emmy Awards, including Outstanding Drama Series with Brown winning for Outstanding Lead Actor in a Drama Series, as well as receiving nominations for the Golden Globe Award for Best Television Series – Drama and the Critics' Choice Television Award for Best Drama Series. The series was renewed for a second and third season on January 18, 2017.

== Cast and characters ==
=== Main ===
- Milo Ventimiglia as Jack Pearson
- Mandy Moore as Rebecca Pearson
- Sterling K. Brown as Randall Pearson
- Chrissy Metz as Kate Pearson
- Justin Hartley as Kevin Pearson
- Susan Kelechi Watson as Beth Pearson
- Chris Sullivan as Toby Damon
- Ron Cephas Jones as William H. "Shakespeare" Hill

=== Recurring ===
- Niles Fitch as teenage Randall Pearson
- Lonnie Chavis as young Randall Pearson
- Hannah Zeile as teenage Kate Pearson
- Mackenzie Hancsicsak as young Kate Pearson
- Logan Shroyer as teenage Kevin Pearson
- Parker Bates as young Kevin Pearson
- Eris Baker as Tess Pearson
- Faithe Herman as Annie Pearson
- Jon Huertas as Miguel Rivas
- Gerald McRaney as Dr. Nathan Katowski (aka Dr. K)
- Jermel Nakia as young adult William H. "Shakespeare" Hill
- Janet Montgomery as Olivia Maine
- Milana Vayntrub as Sloane Sandburg
- Ryan Michelle Bathe as Yvette
- Denis O'Hare as Jessie
- Adam Bartley as Duke
- Alexandra Breckenridge as Sophie
  - Amanda Leighton as teenage Sophie
  - Sophia Coto as young Sophie
- Jill Johnson as Laurie
- Caitlin Thompson as Madison

=== Guest ===
- Alan Thicke as himself
- Brad Garrett as Wes Manning
- Katey Sagal as Lanie Schulz
- Jami Gertz as Marin Rosenthal
- Seth Meyers as himself
- Jimmi Simpson as Andy Fannan
- Elizabeth Perkins as Janet Malone
- Peter Onorati as Stanley Pearson
- Mario Lopez as himself
- Wynn Everett as Shelly
- Ron Howard as himself
- Susan Blakely as Anne
- Katie Couric as herself

== Episodes ==
No. overall	No. in season	Title	Directed by	Written by	Original release date	Prod. code	U.S. viewers (millions)
1	1	"Pilot"	John Requa & Glenn Ficarra	Dan Fogelman	September 20, 2016	1AZC01	10.07
The intertitle references a Wikipedia-sourced statistic about people sharing the same birthday. Jack Pearson is celebrating his 36th birthday when his wife Rebecca goes into labor with their triplets. Personal assistant Kate celebrates her 36th birthday by recommitting to losing weight and befriends Toby at a support group. Her brother Kevin is an actor starring in a popular sitcom The Manny; on his 36th birthday, he states his dissatisfaction with his role and abruptly quits in front of a live audience. Successful businessman Randall, on his 36th birthday, finds and confronts his birth father, William, who abandoned him at a fire station on the day he was born; he then invites William to his house. Jack and Rebecca's plot is revealed to take place in 1980; Rebecca loses one of the triplets at birth, and Kevin and Kate are the surviving pair. Randall is brought to the hospital by a fireman and becomes their adopted brother.
2	2	"The Big Three"	Ken Olin	Dan Fogelman	September 27, 2016	1AZC02	8.75
In flashbacks, Rebecca and Jack are having marital issues; over drinks, Jack vents his issues to his best friend, Miguel. Rebecca confronts Jack over his drinking problem. In the present, William bonds with Randall's daughters, Tess and Annie, who do not know who he really is. Randall's wife, Beth, has suspicions about William's motives and confronts him. Toby and Kate start getting closer. At an industry party, Kevin is told he is contractually obligated to stay on his sitcom two more years. Kate and Toby dance at the party, despite people's laughter. Kevin tries to turn to Randall for advice; they are shown to have had a strained relationship since childhood. Kevin decides to leave the sitcom anyway, and do theater in New York. At the end of the episode, Rebecca visits Randall, and it is revealed that she has remarried to Miguel.
3	3	"Kyle"	John Requa & Glenn Ficarra	Dan Fogelman	October 11, 2016	1AZC03	9.87
A series of brief flashbacks depict William, nicknamed "Shakespeare", meeting Randall's birth mother on a bus ride; they initially bond over poetry, but at some point developed substance abuse problems. William is later shown on the bus as he takes his newborn son to the fire station. After adopting Randall, Rebecca and Jack initially name him Kyle, and struggle to bond with him. Rebecca tracks down William and prevents him from seeing his son; however, she renames him Randall, after William's favorite poet, Dudley Randall. In the present, Rebecca scolds William at Randall's home, after which William decides to leave; Randall then scolds him even harder. William finds out that his cancer is terminal. Planning to move to New York, Kevin wants to bring Kate with him and encourages her to showcase her singing abilities, about which she is uncomfortable. Toby makes grand gestures for Kate, but feels she gives precedence to Kevin. Kevin fires Kate out of love; Kate later visits Toby and the two have sex.
4	4	"The Pool"	John Requa & Glenn Ficarra	Dan Fogelman & Donald Todd	October 18, 2016	1AZC04	9.71
In flashbacks, the Pearsons go to the pool, but have setbacks: Kevin almost drowns while his parents attend to Randall and Kate; Kate is ostracized by her classmates for being overweight; and while Randall befriends other Black children, Rebecca takes it especially hard when another mother suggests some grooming tips for her Black son. In the present, Toby runs into his ex-wife, Josie, while on a date with Kate. Kate gets a job from Josie, but Toby warns Kate about Josie, revealing that Josie's affairs led to his weight gain and caused him to contemplate suicide. William is wrongly accused of loitering in Randall's affluent neighborhood and is annoyed when Randall does not defend him. Kevin is determined to land a serious role on Broadway. He does poorly in his audition, but Olivia, his Tony-nominated scene partner, begrudgingly tells him he got the role because of his fame from The Manny. Kevin temporarily moves in with Randall.
5	5	"The Game Plan"	George Tillman	Joe Lawson	October 25, 2016	1AZC05	8.68
In flashbacks, the Pittsburgh Steelers are winning Super Bowl XIV, but Jack and Rebecca are fighting about not having children. Jack punches a guy who tells him to have his wife be quiet. Kevin and Kate are conceived that night. In the present, Beth believes she may be pregnant again, but discovers that it is a false alarm. William reveals to Kevin he is a big fan of The Manny, and helps Kevin realize he should stop doubting himself. Kevin believes he moved to New York out of fear and uses the play to teach a life lesson to his nieces; he also has a penchant for painting like Jackson Pollock. Toby organizes a viewing party for a Steelers game, but Kate insists on watching the game alone. Kate later reveals to Toby that she prefers to watch football games with Jack's urn, confirming that Jack had died at some point.
6	6	"Career Days"	Craig Zisk	Bekah Brunstetter	November 1, 2016	1AZC06	8.48
Flashbacks reveal that Randall has been extraordinarily intelligent since he was a child, which got him transferred to an elite private school. In the present, Randall trades commodities for businesses based on weather futures, a job no one seems to understand, and he tries unsuccessfully to explain his job on Career Day. Kate starts a new job as a personal assistant for Marin and has to deal with Marin's bratty overweight teenage daughter, Jemma, who believes her mother hired Kate over the other candidates as a way to get through to her. Kate tells Marin about her own strained relationship with her mother and reveals that she no longer talks to Rebecca. Olivia has unorthodox methods of teaching Kevin how to deal with grief. Randall decides he wants to take piano lessons, but not from William.
7	7	"The Best Washing Machine in the World"	Silas Howard	K.J. Steinberg	November 15, 2016	1AZC07	9.50
In flashbacks, teenage Kevin and Randall are bickering harder than ever, leading Kevin to move out of their shared room and into the basement. Tensions surface at a football game, where the two (on opposing teams) get in a fight. In the present, Kevin and Randall go out to dinner by themselves when Rebecca and Miguel have to cancel. It appears Kevin purposely sat them at a large table with other people so they would not have to be alone, and he abruptly leaves when he finds out Randall has never actually seen The Manny. Randall and Kevin fight on the street, although Randall is surprised when Kevin tells onlookers they are brothers. Kate is trying hard to lose weight, but with disappointing results; meanwhile, Toby is hitting his weight-loss goals without trying and wants to abandon the diet altogether. Beth and William eat marijuana brownies together and he accidentally reveals to her that he has known Rebecca since Randall was a baby.
8	8	"Pilgrim Rick"	Sarah Pia Anderson	Isaac Aptaker & Elizabeth Berger	November 22, 2016	1AZC08	9.00
In flashbacks, the Pearsons are going on a six-hour road trip to Rebecca's parents' house for Thanksgiving, but they get into a car accident and abandon the dinner completely, staying at a motel. Present-day Kate takes a break from Toby before Thanksgiving, saying she needs to get a handle on her weight and her life. Kevin invites Olivia to come celebrate Thanksgiving at Randall's house. William advises Olivia to be kinder to Kevin while she has the chance. Kevin allows Miguel to participate in a Pearson Thanksgiving tradition. Beth gives Rebecca an ultimatum, since she had already had 36 years to tell Randall the truth. Randall ultimately discovers the truth when he finds a letter from Rebecca in William's apartment. Distraught, Randall angrily confronts his mother about her knowledge of his biological father at dinner. As he leaves, Kate arrives and announces her plans to have gastric bypass surgery.
9	9	"The Trip"	Uta Briesewitz	Vera Herbert	November 29, 2016	1AZC09	10.53
In flashbacks, child Randall thinks he can find his birth parents by the genetic trait of tongue rolling. Rebecca never tells Jack that she knows about Randall's parents. In the present, Randall is unbearably hurt and devastated by his mother's lies and betrayal. He, Kate, and Kevin make a trip to their family cabin. Olivia tags along with two uninvited guests: her ex-boyfriend Asher, and her playwright Sloane. Randall inadvertently ingests a hallucinogen, and has a vision of Jack at the cabin. Though "Vision Jack" is shocked Rebecca lied, he tells Randall to understand his mother's point of view. Kate still wants to be friends with Toby, but he would rather not. Olivia makes a rude comment to Kate, driving a wedge between the twins. Appalled by Olivia and Asher's behavior, Kevin kicks them out, ending his relationship with her. He later ends up sleeping with Sloane. Randall tells Rebecca he will not speak to her again until Christmas.
10	10	"Last Christmas"	Helen Hunt	Donald Todd	December 6, 2016	1AZC10	10.95
When young Kate develops appendicitis on Christmas Eve, the Pearsons take her to the hospital. There, they run into Dr. K and realize he needs their support after a potentially fatal car crash. In the present, after Olivia abandons the play, Kevin convinces Sloane to take her role. He also celebrates Hanukkah with Sloane's family, and she joins him at Randall's Christmas Eve party. Rebecca joins Kate as she consults a doctor about gastric bypass surgery; Rebecca is shocked to learn about Kate's struggles with binging and depression. Randall talks his co-worker out of a suicide attempt. William is revealed to be bisexual. Toby comes to Randall's house to surprise Kate and they get back together, but he later collapses and is sent to the OR.
11	11	"The Right Thing to Do"	Timothy Busfield	Aurin Squire	January 10, 2017	1AZC11	10.48
Jack and Rebecca look for a house to fit their growing family, but do not expect to be having triplets. Jack ends up asking his estranged abusive father for money and buys a house. In the present, the cause of Toby's collapse is diagnosed as cardiac arrhythmia, not a heart attack. Kate and Toby discuss marriage. Kevin and Sloane are doing well, but Olivia returns from a spiritual retreat to reunite with Kevin. After being pushed by Olivia to make a decision, Kevin ultimately decides to pursue a relationship with Sloane. Randall feels William's time spent with Jesse is taking precious moments away from their family, but is assured it is only to spare everyone eventual pain. William decides to stop his chemotherapy treatments.
12	12	"The Big Day"	Ken Olin	Dan Fogelman & Laura Kenar	January 17, 2017	1AZC12	9.59
The episode takes place in the lead-up to the triplets' birth. Rebecca has a mental breakdown and forgets that it is Jack's birthday. Miguel tries to encourage Jack to celebrate one more birthday before he becomes a father by taking him golfing. Dr. K struggles to accept the death of his wife, who died over a year earlier, including refusing to dispose of her belongings and declining an offer for dinner at a widow's house. Fireman Joe is struggling with his marriage and he asks a priest for a miracle. William drops Randall off as a newborn at the firehouse. Joe decides to take it first to his wife, Samantha, who refuses to look after him even though they could not conceive. Joe takes the baby to the hospital and Jack decides to adopt him. Joe and Samantha reconcile. The next day, Dr. K decides to throw away his wife's belongings and eat dinner at his friend's house.
13	13	"Three Sentences"	Chris Koch	Joe Lawson & Bekah Brunstetter	January 24, 2017	1AZC13	9.63
When the triplets' tenth birthday is approaching, instead of keeping the family tradition of celebrating the day as one, Kevin and Kate encourage their parents to throw them separate parties. At the birthday party, Randall only has a handful of classmates show up, while Kevin and Kate have full parties. When Kate's best friend Sophie arrives, she and Kate's entire party merge into Kevin's party, leaving Kate alone and Jack trying to comfort her. In the present day, Randall is trying to bid for a project in Calgary, but is interrupted by William, who recently stopped chemotherapy treatments and is now energetic. Kate's doctor encourages her to attend a camp instead of having weight loss surgery. A mysterious worker at the camp tries to talk to Kate, who is now engaged to Toby, and tries to seduce her. After Kevin breaks up with Sloane and Toby drops Kate off at the camp, the two go to a bar together. Following Toby's advice to pursue the woman he really loves, Kevin tries to reconcile with Sophie, who is revealed to be his childhood love and ex-wife.
14	14	"I Call Marriage"	George Tillman Jr.	Kay Oyegun	February 7, 2017	1AZC14	9.57
Flashbacks depict Jack and Rebecca's wedding day. Years later, Miguel and his wife Shelly get divorced; fearing their marriage will have the same fate, Jack tries to bring excitement into his and Rebecca's relationship. In the present, Kevin tries to reconcile with Sophie, who blames him for being unfaithful and ruining their marriage. Kevin confesses that he still has feelings for Sophie, and implores her to join him at their childhood restaurant the following day; Sophie ultimately shows up at the restaurant to meet with Kevin. Toby surprises Kate at the camp she is attending and is met with unkindness. Randall is unable to cope with mounting stress, and he and Beth begin visiting a palliative care specialist. Randall misses a business meeting he planned, fully knowing his daughter's chess tournament was on the same night, when Beth insists that family come first.
15	15	"Jack Pearson's Son"	Ken Olin	Isaac Aptaker & Elizabeth Berger	February 14, 2017	1AZC15	9.03
In the past, Rebecca wants to go on tour with her band but, after finding out that she once dated a member of the band, Jack tells her he does not want her to go. They have a fight and Jack has his first drink in years. In the present day, Kate gets kicked out of fat camp and apologizes to Toby. They begin asking questions about each others' lives to strengthen their relationship, though Kate cannot yet answer when asked about how her father died. Randall becomes overwhelmed by work and William's declining health. Kevin is about to open his play, which is being attended by a New York Times reviewer. Right before the play, Kevin receives a call from a distressed Randall. Kevin has a flashback to when Randall used to have nervous breakdowns over self-inflicted pressure. Concerned, Kevin leaves the theater and runs to Randall's office. He finds Randall crying and comforts him.
16	16	"Memphis"	John Requa & Glenn Ficarra	Dan Fogelman	February 21, 2017	1AZC16	9.35
Randall drives William to Memphis, his hometown. Intermittently, William's relationship with his mother while growing up is shown, including when she leaves him as a young adult to take care of relatives in Pittsburgh. William is, at the time, playing in a cover band at his cousin's club. He learns his mother is sick and decides to move to Pittsburgh, where she dies. In the present day, William returns to his old home, then takes Randall to his cousin's club. Although his cousin is still angry at him for not returning to the band, he forgives him and lets him play. The next morning, William is barely conscious in his bed and transported to the hospital, where doctors tell Randall that he has hours to live. Randall calls William "Dad" for the first and last time, then uses Jack's calming technique to help ease William's fear of dying. William dies with Randall by his side.
17	17	"What Now?"	Wendey Stanzler	K.J. Steinberg & Vera Herbert	March 7, 2017	1AZC17	11.15
In flashbacks, Rebecca leaves for her tour. Kate encourages Jack to attend Rebecca's first show; after rejecting a colleague's advances at a happy hour, he sets out driving to the show despite having been drinking. In the present, per William's wishes, Tess and Annie plan a celebration of his life, while Beth feels left out; Randall asks her to toast William and she receives a loving postcard William sent from Memphis. Rebecca admits that she kept William a secret because she feared losing Randall. Randall acknowledges that he and William had the time they needed, and he and Rebecca reaffirm their love. Kevin's play premieres and the family loves it, though an important critic fails to attend. Randall quits his job over his firm's apparent disrespect and lack of appreciation, admitting he doesn't have a plan. Kevin and Sophie consummate their relationship and Ron Howard offers Kevin a film role after having seen the play. Kate struggles to tell Toby about Jack's death, saying she is responsible for it.
18	18	"Moonshadow"	Ken Olin	Dan Fogelman & Isaac Aptaker & Elizabeth Berger	March 14, 2017	1AZC18	12.84
In 1972, Jack and Rebecca are set up on blind dates. Jack and a friend take Jack's life savings to a poker match and win big on the first game, but are then robbed by the host's enforcers. Rebecca, fighting disillusionment over failed efforts to start a singing career, leaves her blind date early to sing at an open mic night. Jack skips his date, planning to rob the bar that hosted the poker match, but is distracted by Rebecca's singing. In 1997, Jack drives drunk to Cleveland to see Rebecca's show, where her ex-boyfriend Ben tries to kiss her. Jack finds out and punches him, prompting Rebecca to drive Jack home. They fight and Jack apologizes, ultimately being told to stay at Miguel's. In the present, Kate and Toby return to Los Angeles; she looks at a photo of Rebecca and decides to pursue singing. Sophie sees Kevin off for a meeting with Ron Howard. Randall looks through a photo album of his childhood and tells Beth that he wants to adopt a baby.

== Production ==
=== Development ===
Dan Fogelman and Don Todd served as the season's showrunners.

=== Casting ===
In 2015, Mandy Moore, Milo Ventimiglia, Justin Hartley, Sterling K. Brown, and Ron Cephas Jones were the first to be cast in Dan Fogelman’s pilot. Chrissy Metz was later cast in the pilot, followed by Susan Kelechi Watson. Jon Huertas joined the cast in 2016.

== Reception ==
=== Critical response ===
The first season of This Is Us received positive reviews, with critics praising cast performances and series plot. On Rotten Tomatoes, it has an approval rating of 91% based on 65 reviews, with a weighted average of 7.67/10. The site's critical consensus reads, "Featuring full-tilt heartstring-tugging family drama, This Is Us will provide a suitable surrogate for those who have felt a void in their lives since Parenthood went off the air."

On Metacritic, the season has a normalized score of 76 out of 100, based on 34 critics, indicating "generally favorable" reviews. TVLine gave the series "A−" saying, "With emotionally resonant dialogue and top-notch performances, This Is Us should fill that Braverman-sized hole in your heart." TV Guide placed This Is Us at ninth among the top ten picks for the most anticipated new shows of the 2016–2017 season and called it, "a well-acted drama about love, life and family." The overall IMDb users rating between 2016-2022 is 149k and weighted average vote of 8.7/10.

This Is Us season 1: Critical reception by episode
Season 1 (2016–17): Percentage of positive critics' reviews tracked by the website Rotten Tomatoes

Writing for The Star-Ledger, Vicki Hyman lauded the series and said, "This Is Us (from Crazy, Stupid, Love screenwriter Dan Fogelman) methodically weaves four seemingly disparate stories into a believable and emotional whole through tiny telling details, relateable moments, and conversations and confrontations that are funny, tender or painful, or all three at once." Entertainment Weekly's Jeff Jensen wrote, "A 21st century thirtysomething for a TV generation that likes a splash of high concept in their shows and isn't afraid of melodrama." Gwen Ihnat of The A.V. Club also reviewed the series positively saying, "The hour accomplishes what it set out to do. It creates characters so compelling that we compulsively want to tune back in to see them again."

In a review for The Boston Globe, Matthew Gilbert said, "The pilot is beautifully shaped, the themes of building your own meaning in life are smart, and the actors already seem to know their characters."

The Washington Post critic Hank Stuever said, "While I'd like to see another few episodes to make sure, there's something comfortably gooey right away about This Is Us, reminding us once more that amid all the high-functioning detectives, emergency-rescue personnel and secret-agent superheroes covered in cryptic tattoos, there are very few network dramas aimed at viewers who are simply interested in everyday people and how they feel." Pittsburgh Post-Gazette's TV critic Rob Owen wrote, "Created and written by Dan Fogelman, This is Us manages the tricky task of telling emotional stories without getting too saccharine. And in each story, the characters are quite relatable." James Poniewozik of The New York Times also gave the series positive reviews and said, "The first hour works its way efficiently through an economy-size box of tissues with cleverly turned dialogue and well-inhabited performances." The series also received praise from critics at other publications such as USA Today, The Atlantic, The Hollywood Reporter, and The Los Angeles Times.

Some were more critical towards the show, Daniel D'Addario of Time wrote, "The show has promise, but its cynicism in terms of trying to evoke an emotional response is both what viewers will be tuning in for and its least accomplished aspect. If it could work to wring out a real response, not just an easy one, this might be a show worth watching each week. Ben Travers, Chief TV critic of Indiewire, quipped, "'It all works out' seems to be the main takeaway from the pilot, but where things specifically go from here is one whopping question mark. Perhaps if this was an episodic anthology series with new characters flooding in every week and new arcs every season, This Is Us could repeat the mysterious highs of its subjectively mediocre pilot (depending on how you like that ending)."

In a moderate review for Variety, Sonia Saraiya said, "It's deceptively difficult to build a surprising and complete story in just 40 minutes with so many characters. Yet This Is Us manages to both craft an intimate series of portraits and stitch them together. But at the same time, waves of cloying sentiment threaten to submerge everything."

==== Critics' top ten lists ====
This Is Us was included on multiple Best/Top TV Shows of 2016 lists; these are listed below in order of rank.

- No. 1 Pittsburgh Post-Gazette
- No. 1 TV Insider
- No. 2 Orlando Sentinel
- No. 2 Sioux City Journal
- No. 3 Lincoln Journal Star
- No. 3 PopSugar
- No. 3 San Francisco Chronicle
- No. 4 Newsday
- No. 4 NPR
- No. 4 People
- No. 5 Hidden Remote
- No. 5 St. Louis Post-Dispatch
- No. 5 Tulsa World
- No. 5 TVLine
- No. 6 The Salt Lake Tribune
- No. 8 St. Paul Pioneer Press
- No. 9 Maclean's
- No. 9 The Star-Ledger
- No. 10 TV Guide
- – American Film Institute
- – Associated Press
- – Cleveland Plain Dealer
- – CNN
- – The Huffington Post
- – New York Post
- – TheWrap
- – Yahoo!

=== Ratings ===
Viewership and ratings per episode of This Is Us season 1
No.	Title	Air date	Rating/share (18–49)	Viewers (millions)	DVR (18–49)	DVR viewers (millions)	Total (18–49)	Total viewers (millions)
1	"Pilot"	September 20, 2016	2.8/10	10.07	1.8	4.55	4.6	14.61
2	"The Big Three"	September 27, 2016	2.6/9	8.75	1.9	5.12	4.5	13.87
3	"Kyle"	October 11, 2016	2.8/9	9.87	1.9	4.95	4.7	14.82
4	"The Pool"	October 18, 2016	2.6/9	9.71	2.0	4.86	4.6	14.57
5	"The Game Plan"	October 25, 2016	2.4/8	8.68	2.1	5.11	4.5	13.83
6	"Career Days"	November 1, 2016	2.3/7	8.48	2.1	5.09	4.4	13.57
7	"The Best Washing Machine in the World"	November 15, 2016	2.6/9	9.50	2.1	5.20	4.7	14.70
8	"Pilgrim Rick"	November 22, 2016	2.4/9	9.00	2.1	5.46	4.5	14.46
9	"The Trip"	November 29, 2016	2.7/9	10.56	1.9	4.96	4.6	15.46
10	"Last Christmas"	December 6, 2016	2.8/9	10.95	2.1	5.45	4.9	16.40
11	"The Right Thing to Do"	January 10, 2017	3.0/11	10.48	2.0	5.33	5.0	15.81
12	"The Big Day"	January 17, 2017	2.6/8	9.53	2.5	6.20	5.1	15.80
13	"Three Sentences"	January 24, 2017	2.8/9	9.63	2.4	6.16	5.2	15.79
14	"I Call Marriage"	February 7, 2017	2.6/8	9.57	2.4	6.23	5.0	15.80
15	"Jack Pearson's Son"	February 14, 2017	2.4/8	9.03	2.4	6.14	4.8	15.17
16	"Memphis"	February 21, 2017	2.5/8	9.35	2.5	6.35	5.0	15.70
17	"What Now?"	March 7, 2017	3.0/10	11.15	2.3	6.04	5.3	17.18
18	"Moonshadow"	March 14, 2017	3.4/12	12.84	1.9	4.94	5.3	17.77

=== Accolades ===
Year	Award	Category	Nominee(s)	Result	Ref.
2016	American Film Institute Awards	TV Program of the Year	This Is Us	Won	
2016	Critics' Choice Television Awards	Most Exciting New Series	This Is Us	Won	
2016	Critics' Choice Television Awards	Best Drama Series	This Is Us	Nominated	
2016	African-American Critics Association Awards	Top Ten TV Show	This Is Us	Won	
2017	People's Choice Awards	Favorite New TV Drama	This Is Us	Won	
2017	People's Choice Awards	Favorite Actor in a New TV Series	Milo Ventimiglia	Nominated	
2017	People's Choice Awards	Favorite Actress in a New TV Series	Mandy Moore	Nominated	
2017	Writers Guild of America Awards	New Series	This Is Us	Nominated	
2017	Writers Guild of America Awards	Episodic Drama	Vera Herbert (for "The Trip")	Won	
2017	Golden Globe Awards	Best Television Series – Drama	This Is Us	Nominated	
2017	Golden Globe Awards	Best Supporting Actress – Series, Miniseries or Television Film	Chrissy Metz	Nominated	
2017	Golden Globe Awards	Best Supporting Actress – Series, Miniseries or Television Film	Mandy Moore	Nominated	
2017	Screen Actors Guild Awards	Outstanding Performance by a Male Actor in a Drama Series	Sterling K. Brown	Nominated	
2017	NAACP Image Awards	Outstanding Drama Series	This Is Us	Nominated	
2017	NAACP Image Awards	Outstanding Actor in a Drama Series	Sterling K. Brown	Won	
2017	NAACP Image Awards	Outstanding Performance by a Youth	Lonnie Chavis	Nominated	
2017	ACE Eddie Awards	Best Edited One Hour Series for Commercial Television	David L. Bertman (for "Pilot")	Won	

== Broadcast ==
This Is Us premiered on NBC in the United States on September 20, 2016. The series premiered on CTV in Canada on September 21, 2016, on TVNZ 2 in New Zealand on September 27, 2016, and on Channel 4 in the United Kingdom on December 6, 2016. The series premiered on Channel Ten in Australia on February 8, 2017.
