= Last Christmas (disambiguation) =

"Last Christmas" is a 1984 song by Wham!.

Last Christmas may also refer to:

- Last Christmas (film), a 2019 film
- "Last Christmas" (Doctor Who), a special Christmas TV episode, 2014
- "Last Christmas!", an episode of DuckTales (2017 TV series), 2018
- "The Last Christmas", an episode of Modern Family (season 11), 2019
- "Last Christmas" (Motherland), a 2022 television episode
- "Last Christmas", an episode of This Is Us (season 1), 2016

== See also ==
- Lost Christmas, a 2011 film
