= Mendelian traits in humans =

Autosomal dominant

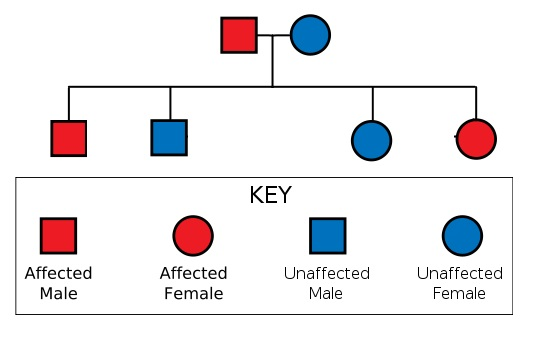
A 50/50 chance of inheritance.

Sickle-cell disease is inherited in the autosomal recessive pattern. When both parents have sickle-cell trait (carrier), a child has a 25% chance of sickle-cell disease (red icon), 25% do not carry any sickle-cell alleles (blue icon), and 50% have the heterozygous (carrier) condition.

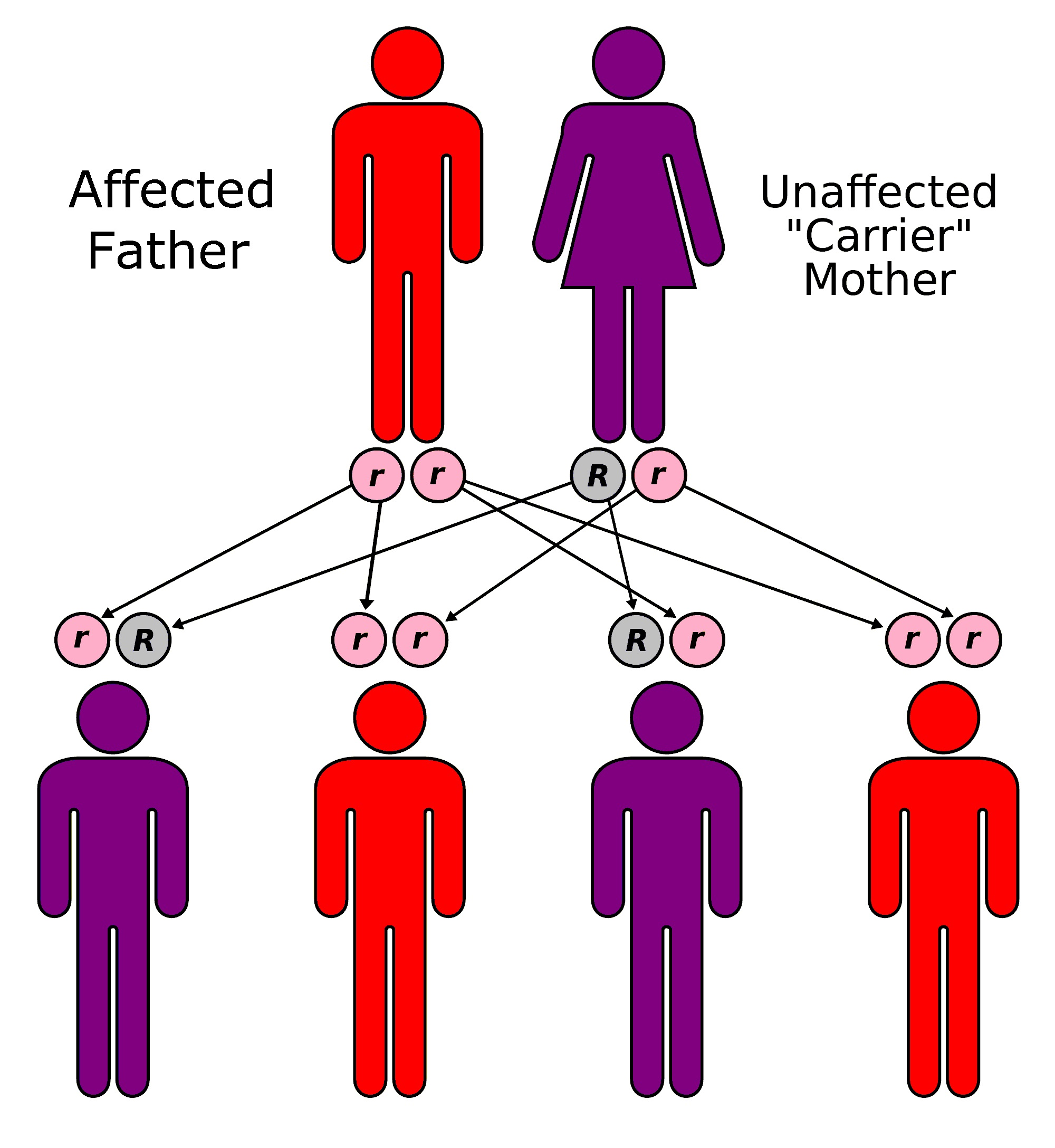
If one parent has sickle-cell anaemia and the other has sickle-cell trait, then the child has a 50% chance of having sickle-cell disease and a 50% chance of having sickle-cell trait.

An example of the codominant inheritance of some of the four blood groups.

Mendelian traits in humans are human traits that are substantially influenced by Mendelian inheritance. Most – if not all – Mendelian traits are also influenced by other genes, the environment, immune responses, and chance. Therefore no trait is purely Mendelian, but many traits are almost entirely Mendelian, including canonical examples, such as those listed below. Purely Mendelian traits are a minority of all traits, since most phenotypic traits exhibit incomplete dominance, codominance, and contributions from many genes. If a trait is genetically influenced, but not well characterized by Mendelian inheritance, it is non-Mendelian.

== Examples ==
- Albinism (recessive)
- Achondroplasia
- Alkaptonuria
- Ataxia telangiectasia
- Brachydactyly (shortness of fingers and toes)
- Cataracts
- Colour blindness (monochromatism, dichromatism, anomalous trichromatism, tritanopia, deuteranopia, protanopia)
- Duchenne muscular dystrophy
- Ectrodactyly
- Ehlers–Danlos syndrome
- Fabry disease
- Galactosemia
- Gaucher's disease
- Haemophilia
- Hereditary breast–ovarian cancer syndrome
- Hereditary nonpolyposis colorectal cancer
- HFE hereditary haemochromatosis
- Huntington's disease
- Hypercholesterolemia
- Krabbe disease
- Lactase persistence (dominant)
- Leber's hereditary optic neuropathy
- Lesch–Nyhan syndrome
- Marfan syndrome
- Niemann–Pick disease
- Phenylketonuria
- Porphyria
- Retinoblastoma
- Sickle-cell disease
- Sanfilippo syndrome
- Tay–Sachs disease
- Wet (dominant) or dry (recessive) earwax

== Non-Mendelian traits ==
Most traits (including all complex traits) are non-Mendelian. Some traits commonly thought of as Mendelian are not, including:

- Eye Color
- Psychiatric diseases
- Hair color
- Height
- Tongue rolling
