= Tongue rolling =

Ability to roll tongue caused by genetic inheritance

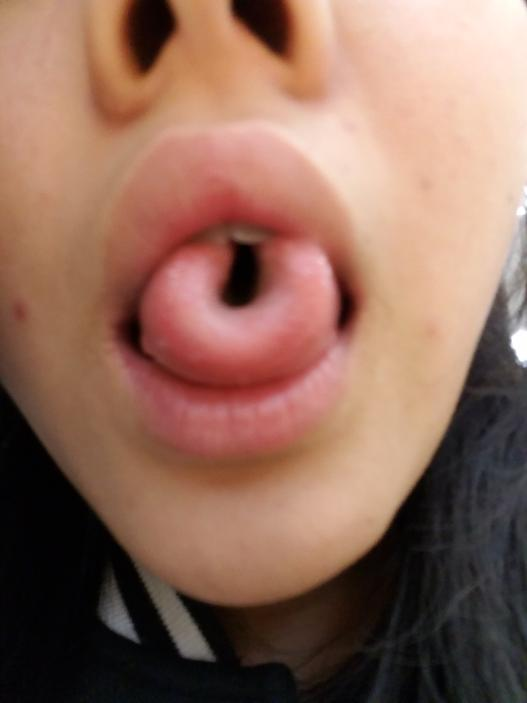
A rolled tongue

Tongue rolling is the ability to roll the lateral edges of the tongue upwards into a tube. The tongue's intrinsic muscles allow some people to form their tongues into specific shapes. Rolling the tongue into a tube shape is often described as a dominant trait with simple Mendelian inheritance, and it is commonly referenced in introductory and genetic biology courses, although there is some disagreement.

== Genetics ==
Prevalence in human populations varies between 65% and 81%.

There is no statistically significant sexual dimorphism in this trait. A 1940 study by Alfred Sturtevant analyzed 282 people of mostly European ancestry and observed that 67.1% of females and 62.9% of males could roll their tongues, and the remaining could not do it. A 1980 study with 992 people also found similar percentages, in 66.84% of females and 63.7% of males possessing the ability.

In some cases, the ability can be learned by practice, more easily by children, but also by adults. For this reason, studies should allow time for individuals to learn this and other abilities. This also indicates that it's not a simple hereditary trait, and there are other factors involved.

In the first paper about this trait as a genetic trait, Sturtevant concluded that the ability "is conditioned at least in part by heredity", and suggests that "it is possible, though not proved, that ability to turn up the edges of the tongue may be due to a single dominant gene, with the fairly frequent occurrence of additional complications". These findings, however, have been questioned.

Several twin studies on the issue have been conducted. A 1952 study involving 33 pairs of identical twins found that 21% of them were discordant - that is, one of the twins had the ability and the other did not. A 1971 study found that identical twins were 18% discordant, and 22% of non-identical twins were discordant, concluding that "hereditary factors strongly influences tongue rolling ability". However, a 1975 study found that identical twins were 28% discordant, while 31% of non-identical twins were discordant, and concluded that identical twins were no more likely than fraternal twins to both have the same phenotype for tongue rolling.

One explanation for the pattern is that the trait has incomplete penetrance. That is, not every individual with the genes can express the trait.

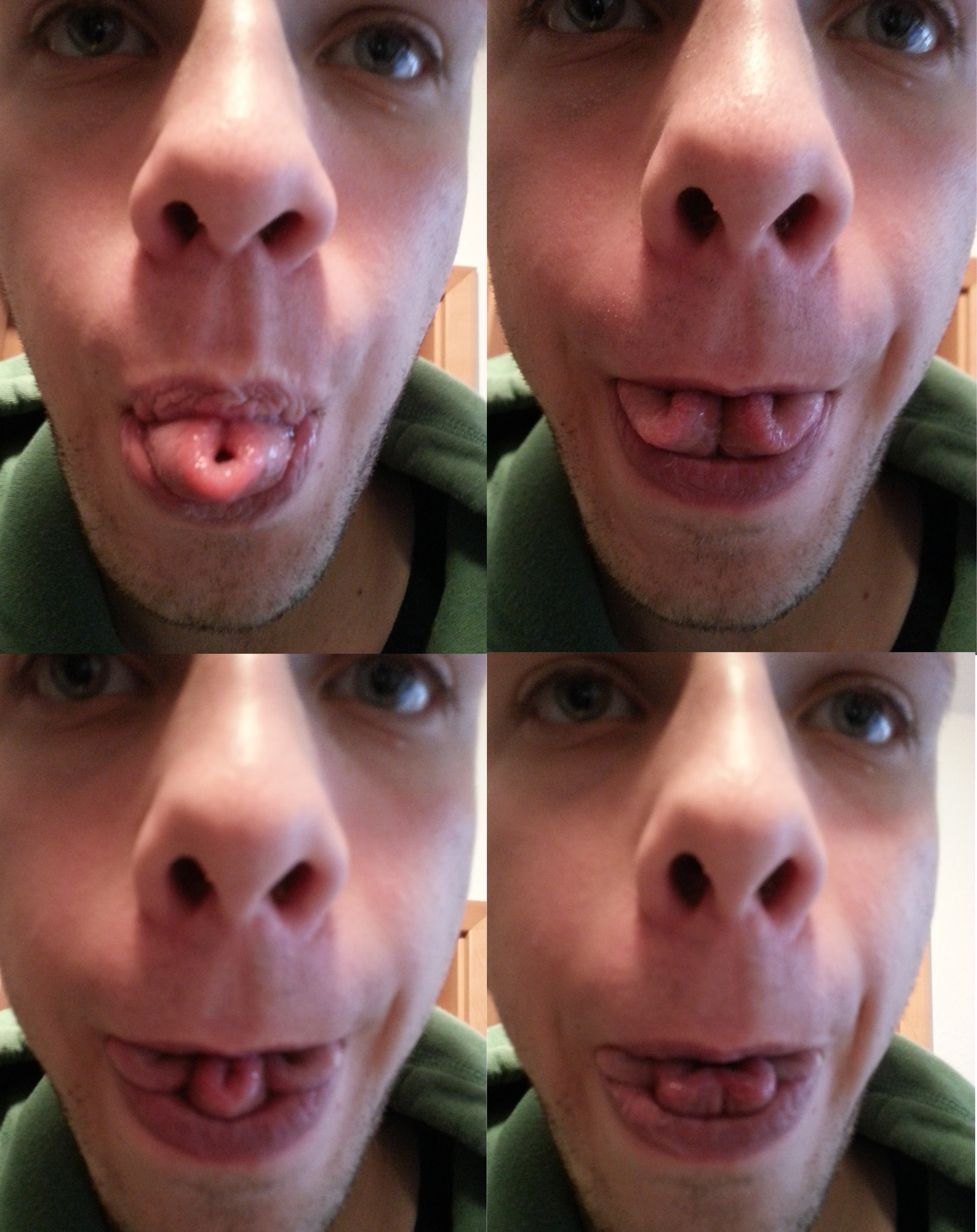
Cloverleaf tongue - 4 times

== Related abilities ==
Cloverleaf tongue is the ability to fold the tongue in a certain configuration with multiple bends. This trait has been speculated by David D. Whitney in 1950 to be a dominant trait inherited separately from tongue rolling.

Other tongue ability is folding the tip of the tongue upwards, which has been proposed as a recessive trait in a 1948 study, with possible epistatic interaction with the rolling gene.

Twisting the tongue has also been studied, which is to rotate the tongue approximately 90 degrees from the plane of the blade, both to the right and to the left.

A 1980 study analyzed if there was any interaction between ear wiggling and tongue rolling, and found it to be the case for males, with men more likely to have both abilities or none, but no interaction was found for females.

== In popular culture ==
In This Is Us, an adopted teenager asks strangers to roll their tongues in an attempt to locate his biological family using genetics.

In the Powerpuff Girls episode "Nuthin' Special", while searching for a unique super power not shared by her sisters, Buttercup finds out she is the only one that can roll her tongue.

In chapter 109 of The Fiery Cross, the fifth novel in Diana Gabaldon’s Outlander series, the ability to roll one’s tongue plays a significant role in the storyline surrounding Jemmy’s paternity. Neither Brianna nor Roger can roll their tongues, a detail that becomes particularly meaningful when Jamie observes that young Jemmy cannot do so either. At the time, tongue-rolling was commonly believed to be a genetically inherited dominant trait. Although this understanding of tongue-rolling genetics is scientifically oversimplified, the shared inability to perform the action provides Roger with reassurance and helps ease his lingering doubts about whether he is Jemmy’s biological father.

== See also ==
- Sibilant § Tongue shape
- Mendelian traits in humans
