= Sometimes (This Is Us) =

- This Is Us episode
- Episode no.: Season 3 Episode 7
- Directed by: Ken Olin
- Written by: Bekah Brunstetter
- Production code: 3AZC07
- Original air date: November 13, 2018

Guest appearances
- Michael Angarano as Nicholas "Nicky" Pearson; Porter Duong as Hien

Episode chronology
← Previous "Kamsahamnida"	Next → "Six Thanksgivings"
- This Is Us (season 3)

"Sometimes" is the seventh episode of the third season of the American comedy-drama series This Is Us, and the 43rd episode overall. It aired on November 13, 2018. Written by the show's supervising producer Bekah Brunstetter, and directed by Ken Olin, the episode focuses on three major plot points that take place during the third season. The episode also directly succeeds the events of season 3's third episode, "Katie Girls".

As with most episodes of the series, this episode traverses several decades and locations. It primarily takes place in Vietnam (both present-day and the during the Vietnam War), and 1970s Los Angeles, California.

"Sometimes" generally garnered praise for efficiently combining multiple elements of the season.

== Plot ==
The beginning of the episode shows how the original necklace was created and eventually found its way to Hien. Jack and his brother Nicky Pearson are deployed in Vietnam, where Nicky's well-being is deteriorating and his behavior is causing problems. Jack asks to be in the same squad as Nicky so that he could look after him, though the act of having family members in the same unit is typically prohibited. In the present, Kevin and Zoe have embarked on an excursion to Vietnam, believing they can find answers about the mysterious local woman in a photograph with Jack, and the necklace that he kept from that era.

In the 1970s, Rebecca and Jack decide to take a road trip from Pittsburgh to Los Angeles for Rebecca to visit a record label, hoping to acquire a contract out of it. Jack is more nebulous about his plans, simply saying he is meeting "some folks" in Reseda. Throughout their trip, staying in motels along the way, they become sexually intimate yet Jack is unwilling to talk about the nightmares he has been experiencing.

It echoes what Kevin is experiencing with Zoe in Vietnam, who frequently changes the subject when asked about her background and family life. While eating lunch–a bat dish–Zoe spots a tourist whom Kevin notices has the same necklace Kevin is trying to find more information about. It turns out the necklace has become a mass-produced souvenir. Later, Kevin expresses to Zoe that he is falling in love with her, and she discloses to him that the reason she has been so guarded about her life is that her father molested her as a child.

In Vietnam, Jack entrusts a local man named Bao to take him back to his base, whom he surmises is member of Viet Cong who produces land mines–Bao says, "sometimes."

In California, Jack is shown to have gone to Reseda to meet the Wattersons, who are the parents of a soldier who died under his watch, having stepped unwittingly on a land mine. Rebecca's audition is ultimately unsuccessful, with the record executives describing her as only "Pittsburgh good." When he picks her up, Jack asks "Bec" to if she can sing her song and while she's singing he weeps.

== Reception ==
"Sometimes" received a viewership of 8.47 million, slightly higher than the season's average of 8.33 million viewers, with 2.0/8 Nielsen rating for the 18-49 demographic.

Entertainment Weekly's David Canfield graded the episode an A−, saying it brought focus to the season compared to previous episodes, and that it was one of the best episodes of the season, though its focus on Kevin meant sacrificing siblings Randall's or Kate's story lines. Based on 10 reviews, the episode received a 100% score on Rotten Tomatoes, with the consensus being, "'Sometimes' dives deeper into Zoe and Jack's traumatic history and yet, it manages to be an exciting, enjoyable episode."

Milo Ventimiglia has received a Primetime Emmy Award for Outstanding Lead Actor in a Drama Series nomination for his performance in this episode.
