= Super Bowl Sunday (This Is Us) =

- This Is Us episode
- Episode no.: Season 2 Episode 14
- Directed by: Glenn Ficarra; John Requa
- Written by: Dan Fogelman
- Production code: 2AZC14
- Original air date: February 4, 2018

Guest appearances
- Bill Irwin; Lyric Ross as Deja; Amanda Leighton as Sophie (teenager); Iantha Richardson as Tess Pearson (adult)

Episode chronology
← Previous "That'll Be The Day"	Next → "The Car"
- This Is Us (season 2)

"Super Bowl Sunday" is the fourteenth episode of the second season of the American television drama series This Is Us, and the thirty-second overall. It was written by showrunner Dan Fogelman, and directed by Glenn Ficarra and John Requa. It was broadcast on February 4, 2018, on NBC in the United States. In the episode, on Super Bowl Sunday of 1998, the Pearsons' house catches fire. The Pearson family manages to escape, but Jack ultimately dies. In present day, the children and Rebecca watch the Super Bowl game remembering Jack.

The episode originally aired immediately following the broadcast of Super Bowl LII. "Super Bowl Sunday" was seen by 26.97 million viewers, according to Nielsen Media Research, making it the most watched episode of This Is Us. It is still the highest-rated scripted entertainment telecast on U.S. television since Fox's 2008 broadcast of the post–Super Bowl episode of House.

The episode received acclaim by critics and audiences alike and is widely regarded as one of the best episodes of the show.

== Plot ==
In 1998, late at night after the Super Bowl, noises wake Jack, who discovers the house is on fire. He wakes Rebecca and calls out to Randall and Kate; Kevin is at Sophie's house. Jack retrieves the children from their bedrooms, using Kate's mattress as a heat shield. Kate, Randall, and Rebecca descend to the ground via a bedsheet rope. Kate's dog, Louie, barks; seeing Kate's desperation, Jack re-enters and emerges with Louie and some family mementos. Leaving Kate and Randall at Miguel's house, Rebecca takes Jack to the hospital for smoke inhalation. While Rebecca is away from the hospital room to handle logistics, Jack suffers a sudden, fatal "widow maker" heart attack. The doctor informs Rebecca, who goes into denial until seeing Jack's body. She tells Miguel, Kate, and Randall, then screams alone in the car; Kate finds and tells Kevin.

In 2018, on the 20th anniversary of Jack's death, Kate cathartically watches the audition tape Jack recorded, which he saved from the fire; the VCR damages it, but Toby gets it repaired and uploaded to the cloud; Kate tells Toby he strengthens her, and Jack would have loved him. Kevin, who usually drinks away his pain on the anniversary, visits the tree where Jack's ashes were scattered; he acknowledges failing to fulfill Jack's legacy, but hopes to make him proud. Rebecca makes and eats Jack's favorite lasagna, and bonds with Kevin; she believes their reunion is a gift from Jack. Randall commemorates Jack with a Super Bowl party for his daughters and their friends. The family's new pet lizard dies suddenly; Randall's eulogy is overly intense and emotional. Tess tells Randall that she has deliberately left the phone off the hook to prevent social workers from calling, fearing Randall's interest in William, Deja, and his new job means he wants "a new life." Randall tells Tess that her birth changed his life; he will always be devoted to her, and plans to have dinner with her every week, even when she's a working adult. Tess thinks the family's participation in fostering is "cool." Deja calls from the house's front door; Randall and Beth bring her inside and comfort her, which Tess happily observes.

Jordan, the boy shown previously in an Essex County social worker's office, is placed with a couple. An older Randall arrives to have dinner with the social worker, who is the adult Tess.

== Production ==
The episode was written by series creator Dan Fogelman. The decision to air an episode of This Is Us after the Super Bowl was announced on May 14, 2017. Fogelman envisioned Jack's death as a consequence of the fire since the pilot script. He wanted the moment to take place towards the end of the second season and asked for the slot upon knowing NBC would air the Super Bowl.

The fire sequence was filmed in December 2017 in Newhall Ranch, California.

Actual footage from NBC's broadcast of Super Bowl LII, including scenes from the pre-game show and the game itself, were edited into scenes of the episode shortly prior to broadcast.

== Reception ==
=== Ratings ===
"Super Bowl Sunday" was originally broadcast on Sunday, February 4, 2018, in the United States on NBC. The episode was watched in the United States by a total of 26.97 million people. It is the most-watched entertainment telecast since 2012 and the most-watched TV drama episode since 2008's House's Super Bowl episode, which attracted 29 million viewers.

=== Critical response ===
The episode drew critical acclaim from critics, with Mandy Moore's acting receiving critical acclaim. It has an 87% approval rating on the review aggregator website Rotten Tomatoes, based on 15 reviews with an average score of 8.54/10. The site's consensus reads, "Mandy Moore's performance proves to be a game changer in 'Super Bowl Sunday,' eclipsing the episode's plot twists, aching dialogue, and even Jack's death".

Kimberly Roots of TVLine deemed the installment "a good episode". Brian Lowry of CNN called the episode "emotional", explaining it had "strong individual moments for each of the key characters" and that it "managed to play with expectations". Caroline Siede of The A.V. Club praised Mandy Moore's performance as Rebecca, saying she has become the "MVP of season 2". She thought the fire sequence was "compelling, well-staged action". She appreciated that the series didn't "go too over-the-top" with Jack's death so as it doesn't become "emotional porn". To her, the present-day scenes served as introduction for new viewers, establishing the show's world, and the flash-forward was a surprise.

Kelly Lawler of USA Today wrote: "Although This Is Us is known for its big twists and fake-outs, at its core the show (like most) is about its characters. 'Super Bowl Sunday' succeeded by focusing on Kevin (Justin Hartley), Kate, Randall (Sterling K. Brown) and Rebecca (Mandy Moore) in the present and past. By not drawing out Jack's death even further, the episode managed to be more about the different ways Jack's family members experienced their grief, and not about tricking the audience. It was the right way for the often-frustrating mystery to end."

Conversely, Laura Prudom of IGN described the episode as "a cry-fest, to be sure, because this show is used to wringing our tear ducts dry with surgical precision, but there's no denying that the whole exercise also felt unashamedly manipulative, which is a trap This Is Us often falls into -- especially when it's trying to hide things from the audience to show us how clever it is. For viewers who tuned in for the first time after the big game [...], it probably made the regular This Is Us audience seem like complete masochists." Time writer Daniel D'Addario gave a negative review disapproving the fact that Jack's death, though "movingly depicted", was used for entertainment purposes. "The sort of show This Is Us is in its strongest moments—one in which family members have frank and honest conversations about their hopes and fears—isn’t one that stages a ritual death on Super Bowl Sunday, after deploying cast members to brag about how it will make you cry."

=== Crock-Pot controversy ===
In the previous episode "That'll Be the Day" a Crock-Pot was shown to be the cause of the fire, causing negative reactions on social media. Some people wanted to get rid of their Crock-Pots, one reason being the fear that something could happen with theirs. The manufacturer assured fans of the show their product was safe. Although a lawsuit was considered, the makers of Crock-Pot created a Twitter account of their own where they continued the positive messages, and even posted on Facebook. During Super Bowl LII, Ventimiglia appeared in an apology ad. A month after the controversy, not only did the brand restore its reputation but sales of Crock-Pots had increased.
