= Frozen (House) =

- House episode
- Episode no.: Season 4 Episode 11
- Directed by: David Straiton
- Written by: Liz Friedman
- Original air date: February 3, 2008

Guest appearances
- Mira Sorvino as Dr. Cate Milton; Jeff Hephner as Sean; Anne Dudek as Dr. Amber Volakis

Episode chronology
← Previous "It's a Wonderful Lie"	Next → "Don't Ever Change"
- House season 4

"Frozen" is the eleventh episode of the fourth season of House and the eighty-first episode overall. It aired on Fox on February 3, 2008, following Super Bowl XLII; it attracted slightly more than 29 million viewers, making it the highest rated House episode of the entire series. It was ranked third for the week, tied with that week's episode of American Idol (also on Fox) and outranked only by the Super Bowl game and the Super Bowl post-game show.

House became the first dramatic TV series to be the lead-out program of a Fox-aired Super Bowl since The X-Files following Super Bowl XXXI. This is the second episode of the show to have an Academy Award winner as a guest star – Mira Sorvino (the first was "Informed Consent" with Joel Grey).

== Plot ==
Psychiatrist Cate Milton collapses and vomits in a research station in the middle of Antarctica. Weather conditions prevent her from being evacuated, so House is asked to examine her through a webcam. Foreman suspects cancer after her right lung nearly collapses.

House asks to sample her lymph nodes to detect cancer since the test procedures that can be performed are severely limited by the lack of drugs, equipment, and medical personnel on the base. While Foreman and Wilson are looking for makeshift stains for the slides (they test the usefulness of coffee, red wine, etc.), House notices Wilson's quickness to agree and his lavender shirt, and deduces that he is dating someone. Wilson dismisses his suspicions.

After looking at Cate's test results, Wilson concludes she does not have cancer, but Cate's left kidney shuts down. House's theory changes to autoimmune disease, for which she would need to take prednisone. Cate insists on proof (prednisone is a limited resource and there is an asthmatic on the base who could die without it). The team tells her to go outside, since extreme cold has been used as a treatment for auto-immune diseases. As Cate prepares to go outside, she faints and lapses into a coma. House goes on to treat her for brain swelling by having mechanic Sean drill a hole in her skull to see whether her coma is caused by increased intracranial pressure or a problem with her hypothalamus.

After the drilling, Cate regains consciousness. Kutner suggests there is a fat embolus. House realizes it would take an untreated bone break to cause the fat emboli, and that he has seen every part of her body but her feet (because she kept her socks on during her self-examination). A simple examination reveals that her big toe is broken, the pain numbed by the cold. The toe is reset and splinted and Cate is expected to fully recover.

Throughout the episode, House shows feelings for Cate, asking if she is okay and later, telling the only other person with her that he (House) will not let him hurt her. After House sees that the person with her is in love with her, he stops flirting with her. Finally, House goes to the restaurant where Wilson is meeting with his girlfriend, who he learns is Amber, also known to House as "Cutthroat Bitch".
