= Eris Baker =

American actress

- Born: August 4, 2005 (age 21); Los Angeles, California, U.S.
- Occupation: Actress
- Years active: 2016–present

Eris Baker (born August 4, 2005) is an American actress. She played Tess Pearson on the television series This Is Us (2016–2022).

== Early life ==
Baker was born and raised in Los Angeles. She is the eldest of four girls. Her interest in acting was sparked while she participated in elementary school plays. She followed acting classes and her parents found her an agent. She believes in God, saying: "What helps me is my relationship with God. Whenever I'm down, I read the word; I pray. It helps me become more confident." She attends public school.

== Career ==
At age eleven, Baker landed the role of Tess Pearson in the television series This Is Us. She won with the rest of the cast two Screen Actors Guild Award for Outstanding Performance by an Ensemble in a Drama Series. She has also appeared in other television series such as Disney Channel's K.C. Undercover, Netflix's Alexa & Katie, and Comedy Central's Drunk History.

== Filmography ==
Television roles
Year	Title	Role	Notes
2016–2022	This Is Us	Tess Pearson	Main role
2017–2018	K.C. Undercover	Diane	3 episodes
2018	Alexa & Katie	Michelle	
2019	Drunk History		2 episodes
2022	Bite Size Halloween	Kat	

== Awards and nominations ==
Year	Award	Category	Project	Result
2018	Screen Actors Guild Awards	Outstanding Performance by an Ensemble in a Drama Series	This Is Us	Won
2019	Screen Actors Guild Awards	Outstanding Performance by an Ensemble in a Drama Series	This Is Us	Won
2022	NAACP Image Awards	Outstanding Performance by a Youth (Series, Special, Television Movie or Limited Series)	This Is Us	Nominated
