= This Is Us =

American family drama television series

- Genre: Comedy drama; Family drama; Romantic drama; Tragedy
- Created by: Dan Fogelman
- Showrunners: Dan Fogelman; Isaac Aptaker; Elizabeth Berger
- Starring: Milo Ventimiglia; Mandy Moore; Sterling K. Brown; Chrissy Metz; Justin Hartley; Susan Kelechi Watson; Chris Sullivan; Ron Cephas Jones; Jon Huertas; Alexandra Breckenridge; Niles Fitch; Logan Shroyer; Hannah Zeile; Mackenzie Hancsicsak; Parker Bates; Eris Baker; Faithe Herman; Lonnie Chavis; Melanie Liburd; Lyric Ross; Griffin Dunne; Asante Blackk; Caitlin Thompson; Chris Geere
- Composer: Siddhartha Khosla
- Country of origin: United States
- Original language: English
- No. of seasons: 6
- No. of episodes: 106 (list of episodes)

Production
- Executive producers: Dan Fogelman; Jess Rosenthal; Donald Todd; Ken Olin; Charlie Gogolak; John Requa; Glenn Ficarra; Isaac Aptaker; Elizabeth Berger; Kay Oyegun
- Production location: Los Angeles, California
- Camera setup: Single-camera
- Running time: 42 minutes
- Production companies: Rhode Island Ave. Productions; Zaftig Films; 20th Television (Note: Known as 20th Century Fox Television from seasons 1 through 4.)

Original release
- Network: NBC
- Release: September 20, 2016 – May 24, 2022

This Is Us is an American drama television series created by Dan Fogelman that aired on NBC from September 20, 2016, to May 24, 2022. The series follows the lives and families of two parents and their three children in several different timeframes. It stars an ensemble cast featuring Milo Ventimiglia, Mandy Moore, Sterling K. Brown, Chrissy Metz, Justin Hartley, Susan Kelechi Watson, Chris Sullivan, Ron Cephas Jones, Jon Huertas, Alexandra Breckenridge, Niles Fitch, Logan Shroyer, Hannah Zeile, Mackenzie Hancsicsak, Parker Bates, Eris Baker, Faithe Herman, Lonnie Chavis, Melanie Liburd, Lyric Ross, Asante Blackk, Griffin Dunne, Caitlin Thompson and Chris Geere. This Is Us was filmed in Los Angeles.

In September 2016, NBC picked up the series for a full season of 18 episodes. In January 2017, NBC renewed the series for two additional seasons of 18 episodes each, and then in May 2019, it was renewed for three more seasons. In May 2021, it was announced that the sixth would be its final season, which premiered on January 4, 2022.

== Series overview ==
The series follows the Pearson family over multiple decades. Siblings Kevin, Kate and Randall are followed in the present day, while non-linear flashbacks show their childhood and young adult lives with their parents, Jack and Rebecca. Kevin and Kate are the two surviving members of triplets, born six weeks premature on Jack's 36th birthday in 1980; their brother Kyle was stillborn. Believing they were meant to have three children, Jack and Rebecca decide to adopt Randall, an African American boy born earlier that day and brought to the same hospital after his biological father William Hill abandoned him at a fire station. Jack dies when his children are 17 due to a heart attack during a fire at their home. Rebecca later marries Jack's best friend Miguel.

Randall becomes a successful finance professional and marries college classmate Beth; they raise two daughters (Tess and Annie) and later adopt an older girl, Deja. Kevin becomes a successful actor while struggling to be taken seriously. After lacking direction much of her life and struggling with obesity, Kate meets and marries Toby, pursues a career in music, gets a degree, and becomes a mother.

Most episodes feature a storyline taking place in the present (2016–2022, contemporaneous with airing) and a storyline taking place at a set time in the past. Some episodes are set in one time period or use multiple flashback time periods. Flashbacks often focus on Jack and Rebecca circa 1980, both before and after their children's birth, or on the family when the big three are children or adolescents, and are played by two sets of younger actors; these scenes usually take place in Pittsburgh, where the big three and their parents are born and raised.

As adults, their homes vary more widely: Kate lives in Los Angeles, Randall and his family are in New Jersey and later Philadelphia, and Kevin relocates from Los Angeles to New York City and back again, with a brief return to western Pennsylvania along the way. Various other time periods and locations have also served as settings. Some episodes have focused on the earlier experiences of other characters, including Randall's family members, his biological father William, Deja, and Beth. Beginning in the second season, the show also uses occasional flashforwards to a later time period, where the family gather before Rebecca's death. In the second half of the final season, the contemporary narrative advances over several years to meet the flashforwards' time period.

== Cast and characters ==
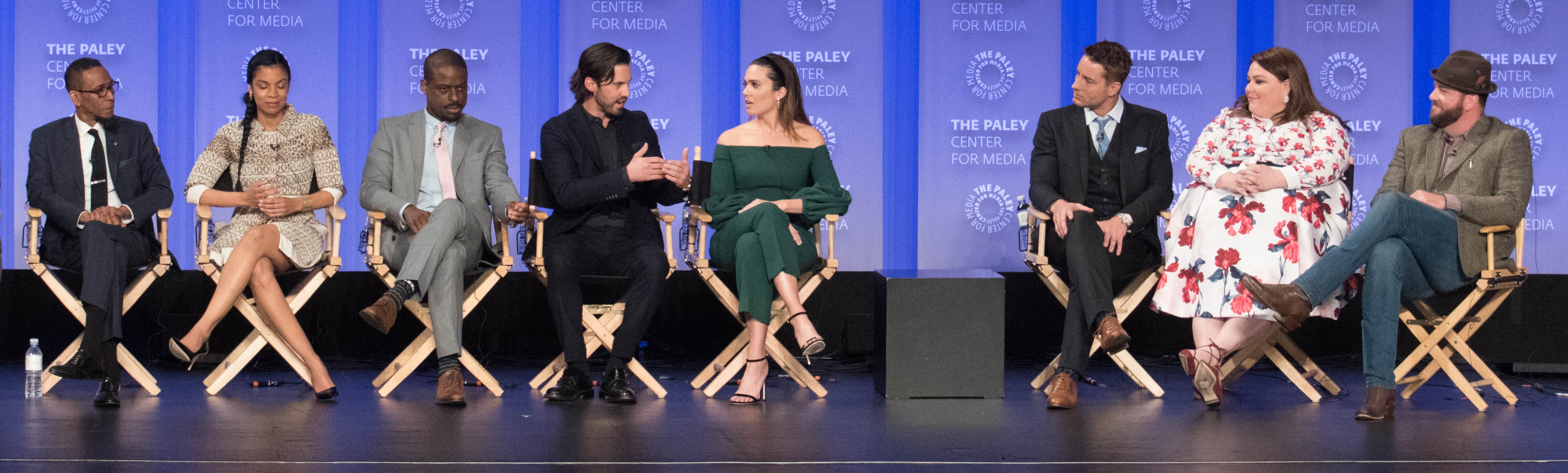
Main cast members (left to right) Jones, Watson, Brown, Ventimiglia, Moore, Hartley, Metz, and Sullivan at PaleyFest 2017

- Milo Ventimiglia as Jack Pearson: Rebecca's first husband, Kate and Kevin's biological father, and Randall's adoptive father. He is also the grandfather to Deja, Tess, Annie Pearson, Jack and Hailey Damon, and Franny and Nick Pearson, and the great-grandfather to Hope Damon and William Hodges. Jack dies from a heart attack caused by smoke inhalation when his children are seventeen.
  - Also portrayed by Joaquin Obradors as a child (recurring seasons 2–4, 6).
- Mandy Moore as Rebecca Pearson (née Malone): Jack's and Miguel's wife; Kate and Kevin's biological mother, and Randall's adoptive mother, grandmother to Deja, Tess and Annie Pearson, Hailey and Jack Damon, and Nicholas and Franny Pearson, and great-grandmother to Hope Damon.
  - Also portrayed by Ava Castro and Kya Kruse as a child (recurring seasons 2–4).
- Sterling K. Brown as Randall Pearson: Jack and Rebecca's adopted son, Kate and Kevin's adopted brother; Beth's husband, Tess, Annie and Deja's father, William Hill and Laurel Dubois biological son, and Jack and Hailey Damon's and Franny and Nick Pearson's uncle.
  - Also portrayed by Niles Fitch (ages 16–18) (recurring season 1; main seasons 2–6), Lonnie Chavis (ages 9–12) (recurring season 1; main seasons 2–6), and Caron Coleman (ages 3–6) (recurring seasons 4–6).
- Chrissy Metz as Kate Pearson: Jack and Rebecca's biological daughter, Kevin's biological twin sister, and Randall's adoptive sister; Jack and Hailey Damon's mother, Phillip's wife; Deja, Tess, Annie, Franny, and Nick's aunt; Toby's ex-wife.
  - Also portrayed by Hannah Zeile (ages 16–18) (recurring season 1; main seasons 2–6), Mackenzie Hancsicsak (ages 9–12) (recurring season 1; main seasons 2–6), and Isabella Rose Landau (ages 3–6) (recurring seasons 4–6).
- Justin Hartley as Kevin Pearson: Jack and Rebecca's biological son; Kate's biological twin brother, and Randall's adoptive brother, father to Nick and Franny, husband to Sophie, and uncle to Deja, Tess and Annie Pearson, and Jack and Hailey Damon. Kevin is also Madison Simons’ ex fiance.
  - Also portrayed by Logan Shroyer (ages 16–18) (recurring season 1; main seasons 2–6), Parker Bates (ages 9–12) (recurring season 1; main seasons 2–6), and Kaz Womack (ages 3–6) (recurring seasons 4–6).
- Susan Kelechi Watson as Beth (Clarke) Pearson: Randall's wife, and mother of Deja, Tess and Annie.
  - Also portrayed by Rachel Hilson (ages 16–18) and Akira Akbar (child).
- Chris Sullivan as Toby Damon: Kate's first husband and father of Hailey and Jack Damon.
  - Also portrayed by Luke Clark as a teenager, and Dylan Gage as a child.
- Ron Cephas Jones as William "Shakespeare" Hill: Randall's biological father (main seasons 1–2; recurring seasons 3–6).
  - Also portrayed by Jermel Nakia as a young adult (recurring seasons 1–2 & 5; guest season 4).
- Jon Huertas as Miguel Rivas: Jack's best friend and Rebecca's second husband (recurring season 1; main seasons 2–6).
- Alexandra Breckenridge as Sophie Inman: Kate's childhood best friend, as well as Kevin's childhood love and wife (recurring seasons 1 & 6; main season 2; guest seasons 3–5).
  - Also portrayed by Amanda Leighton (ages 15–19), Sophia Coto (ages 10–12), and Kai Trueblood Fall (ages 3–6).
- Eris Baker as Tess Pearson: Randall and Beth's older daughter (recurring season 1; main season 2–6).
  - Also portrayed by Iantha Richardson as a young adult (guest seasons 2–6).
- Faithe Herman as Annie Pearson: Randall and Beth's younger daughter (recurring season 1; main seasons 2–6).
  - Also portrayed by Iyana Halley as a young adult (season 5–6)
- Melanie Liburd as Zoe Baker: Beth's cousin and Kevin's ex-girlfriend (guest seasons 2 and 5; main season 3).
  - Also portrayed by Brianna Reed as a teenager and Dakota Baccelli as a child (guest seasons 2–3).
- Lyric Ross as Deja Pearson: Randall and Beth's adopted daughter (recurring season 2; main seasons 3–6)
  - Also portrayed by Makenzie Lee-Foster as a child (recurring seasons 2–4).
  - Also portrayed by La Trice Harper as a young adult (seasons 5–6)
- Griffin Dunne as Nicholas "Nicky" Pearson: Jack's brother and Kevin, Kate and Randall's uncle (recurring seasons 3 and 5; main seasons 4 & 6).
  - Also portrayed by Michael Angarano as a young adult, and Donnie Masihi as a child (guest seasons 3–4; recurring seasons 2–4).
- Asante Blackk as Malik Hodges: Deja's classmate and later boyfriend; has an infant daughter from a prior romantic relationship. (main seasons 4–6).
- Caitlin Thompson as Madison Simons: Kate's best friend, and Kevin's ex-fiancé and mother of his twins, Franny and Nick. (recurring seasons 1–4; main seasons 5–6)
- Chris Geere as Philip: Kate's co-worker and second husband. (guest season 5; main season 6)

== Episodes ==
Season	Episodes	Originally released		Rank	Avg. viewership (inc. DVR) (in millions)
Season	Episodes	First released	Last released	Rank	Avg. viewership (inc. DVR) (in millions)
1	18	September 20, 2016	March 14, 2017	6	14.70
2	18	September 26, 2017	March 13, 2018	4	17.43
3	18	September 25, 2018	April 2, 2019	6	13.80
4	18	September 24, 2019	March 24, 2020	7	11.55
5	16	October 27, 2020	May 25, 2021	13	9.32
6	18	January 4, 2022	May 24, 2022	17	8.13

== Production ==
=== Development ===
This is Us originally began as an 80-page movie script that Dan Fogelman was developing while working for ABC Studios in the spring of 2015. The story line, which Fogelman admitted to not having a definite direction, revolved around the lives of eight adults who, as it would be revealed, were octuplets. After moving to an eight-figure deal with 20th Century Fox Television, Fogelman made the decision to develop a television series from the characters of his original script, cutting a few characters and shortening the script to 45 pages before bringing it to the studio. Jennifer Salke, president at NBC, commented on the conception of a title for the series, saying "The title didn't come easy... but This Is Us tapped into everything, and the show's about us." It has been revealed that other ideas for the title included 36, Happy Birthday, and The Story of Us.

Despite positive reviews from both 20th Century Fox Television and its sister company, Fox, there were concerns regarding risk of attracting an audience, and Fox sold it to NBC. Fox did so because NBC promised to use the high volume of viewers from The Voice and the Summer Olympics to bring additional viewers to the series, and Fox wanted to solidify the reputation of its studio among writers and directors as placing shows where they are most likely to succeed, even if it is not Fox.

On September 27, 2016, NBC picked up the series for a full season of 18 episodes. In January 2017, NBC renewed the series for two additional seasons of 18 episodes each. The second season premiered on September 26, 2017. The third season premiered on September 25, 2018. In May 2019, NBC renewed the series for three additional seasons. The fourth season premiered on September 24, 2019. The fifth season premiered on October 27, 2020. On May 12, 2021, it was announced that the series would conclude with the sixth season. Production wrapped on May 3, 2022.

=== Filming locations ===
In addition to filming in Los Angeles, the series shot a few scenes on location in New York City, Philadelphia, San Francisco and one in Memphis. One of the locations featured in Los Angeles was the actual home of actress Alyson Hannigan and her family.

=== Commitment to diversity ===
Fogelman intentionally recruited behind-the-scenes talent that would reflect the diversity of his cast, with the goal of bringing greater authenticity to the dialog and storylines. These include black directors Regina King and George Tillman Jr., and black female writers Kay Oyegun and Jas Waters (they were part of a 30% black core writing staff; far outpacing the industry standard of 5%). In addition, Fogelman's sister Deborah, whose struggles with weight inspired one element of the show, serves as a consultant.

== Release ==
In May 2017, Hulu acquired the SVOD rights to new and past episodes of the series to air exclusively on Hulu, in addition to NBC.com and the NBC app. Internationally, the SVOD rights to This Is Us is shared between Hulu's sister streaming service, Disney+ under the Star content hub and Amazon Prime Video who previously acquired the exclusive streaming rights to the series back in 2017 until Disney+ made a deal with Prime Video to share the rights. In the United States, the series was added to Netflix on January 8, 2024.

=== DVD releases ===
Region 1
DVD title	Season(s)	Aspect ratio	Episode count	Total running time	Release date(s)
The Complete First Season	1	16:9	18	775 minutes	September 12, 2017
The Complete Second Season	2	16:9	18	776 minutes	September 11, 2018
The Complete Third Season	3	16:9	18	775 minutes	September 10, 2019
The Complete Fourth Season	4	16:9	18	775 minutes	January 18, 2020
The Complete Fifth Season	5	16:9	16	689 minutes	November 16, 2021

== International versions ==
Country/language	Local title	English translation	Channel	Date aired/premiered	End date
Turkey	Bir Aile Hikayesi	A Family Story	FOX	March 9, 2019	October 19, 2019
Netherlands	Dit zijn wij	This Is Us	KRO-NCRV	November 14, 2019	March 4, 2020
France / Belgium	Je te promets	I Promise you	Salto and TF1 (France) / RTL TVI and Plug RTL (Belgium)	January 22, 2021	Present
Italy	Noi	Us	Rai 1	March 6, 2022	April 10, 2022

== Reception ==
=== Critical response ===
Throughout every season, the series received widespread critical acclaim from critics with an average rating of 94% on Rotten Tomatoes.

The review aggregation website Rotten Tomatoes reported a 92% approval rating for the first season with an average rating of 7.6/10 based on 216 reviews. The website's critical consensus reads, "Featuring full-tilt heartstring-tugging family drama, This Is Us will provide a suitable surrogate for those who have felt a void in their lives since Parenthood went off the air." Metacritic, which uses a weighted average, assigned the season a score of 76 out of 100 based on 34 reviews, indicating "generally favorable reviews".

Season 2 received a 92% approval rating from Rotten Tomatoes based on 214 reviews, with an average score of 7.85/10. The site's consensus reads: "This is Us continues to tug at heartstrings with an emotional exploration of family that ensures viewers will want to keep the tissues close – and their loved ones closer".

Season 3 received a 94% approval rating from Rotten Tomatoes based on 165 reviews, with an average of 7.15/10. The site's consensus reads: "With a lot of love, hugs, and tears, season three of This is Us continues to please fans with new intense storylines".

Season 4 received a 91% approval rating from Rotten Tomatoes based on 11 reviews, with an average of 7.3/10. The site's consensus reads: "This Is Us reaffirms that it is more than just a mystery box in its fourth season, pressing on with some of its most central questions answered – but its emotional power intact."

Entertainment Weekly gave the show a grade B, calling it "a refreshing respite from the relational violence and pessimism that marks the other buzz soaps that have bubbled forth from a culture of divisiveness". Moreover, they praised all the actors, specifically Sterling K. Brown, for being able to navigate "his scenes with such intelligence, authenticity, and charisma".

=== Ratings ===
Viewership and ratings per season of This Is Us
Season	Timeslot (ET)	Episodes	First aired		Last aired		TV season	Viewership rank	Avg. viewers (millions)	18–49 rank	Avg. 18–49 rating
Season	Timeslot (ET)	Episodes	Date	Viewers (millions)	Date	Viewers (millions)	TV season	Viewership rank	Avg. viewers (millions)	18–49 rank	Avg. 18–49 rating
1	Tuesday 9:00 pm	18	September 20, 2016	10.07	March 14, 2017	12.84	2016–17	6	14.70	5	4.6
2	Tuesday 9:00 pm	18	September 26, 2017	12.94	March 13, 2018	10.94	2017–18	4	17.43	2	5.4
3	Tuesday 9:00 pm	18	September 25, 2018	10.54	April 2, 2019	8.22	2018–19	6	13.80	4	3.8
4	Tuesday 9:00 pm	18	September 24, 2019	7.88	March 24, 2020	7.96	2019–20	7	11.55	4	2.9
5	Tuesday 9:00 pm	16	October 27, 2020	7.30	May 25, 2021	5.14	2020–21	13	9.32	3	2.0
6	Tuesday 9:00 pm	18	January 4, 2022	5.46	May 24, 2022	6.37	2021–22	17	8.13	3	1.6

- Note: Outside of the regular Tuesday 9:00 pm timeslot, the first season's first, second and eleventh episodes aired on Tuesday at 10:00 pm, along with the fifth-season finale. Additionally, the second season's fourteenth episode, "Super Bowl Sunday", aired on a Sunday at 10:15 pm.
