= Impossible =

Impossible, Imposible or Impossibles may refer to:

== Music ==
- ImPossible (album), a 2016 album by Divinity Roxx
- The Impossible (album), a 1981 album by Ken Lockie

=== Groups ===
- The Impossibles (American band), a 1990s indie-ska group from Austin, Texas
- The Impossibles (Australian band), an Australian band
- The Impossibles (Thai band), a 1970s Thai rock band

=== Songs ===
- "Impossible" (Captain Hollywood Project song) (1993)
- "The Impossible" (song), a country music song by Joe Nichols (2002)
- "Impossible" (Edyta Górniak song) (2003)
- "Impossible" (Kanye West song) (2006)
- "Impossible" (Travis Scott song) (2015)
- "Impossible" (Teezo Touchdown song) (2023)
- "Impossible" (Daniel Merriweather song) (2009)
- "Impossible" (Måns Zelmerlöw song) (2009)
- "Impossible" (Anberlin song) (2010)
- "Impossible" (Shontelle song) (2010), covered by James Arthur (2012)
- "Impossible", from Rodgers and Hammerstein's 1957 musical Cinderella
- "Impossible", a song written by Steve Allen and recorded by Nat King Cole for his 1958 album The Very Thought of You
- "Impossible", from the 1994 album The Screaming Jets by The Screaming Jets
- "Impossible", from the 1997 album Wu-Tang Forever by the Wu-Tang Clan
- "Impossible", a song written by Alicia Keys and recorded by Christina Aguilera for her 2002 album Stripped
- "Impossible", from the 2003 album Animositisomina by Ministry
- "Impossible", from the 2003 album Being Somebody by Liberty X
- "Impossible", from the 2005 album Something Different by Sidewalk Prophets
- "Impossible", from the 2006 album Glory by Manafest
- "Impossible", from the 2007 album Our Ill Wills by the Shout Out Louds
- "Impossible", from the 2008 album Billion Dollar Sound by Rich Cronin
- "Impossible", from the 2009 album All I Ever Wanted by Kelly Clarkson
- "Imposible" (Luis Fonsi and Ozuna song), 2018
- "Imposible" (KZ Tandingan and Shanti Dope song), 2019
- "Imposible", from the 2023 album Mi Otra Mitad by Raymix
- "Impossible" (Riize song) (2024)

== Film and television ==
- The Impossible (1965 film), an Egyptian film
- Imposible (2004 film), an Argentine film
- The Impossible (2012 film), an English-language Spanish film
- Impossible (2015 film), a Chinese film
- Impossible (game show), a British television game show
- The Impossibles (TV series), a 1960s Hanna-Barbera cartoon television series
- "Impossible" (Desperate Housewives), an episode of the TV series Desperate Housewives

== Fictional characters ==
- Impossible Man, a Marvel Comics character
- Doctor Impossible (DC Comics), a DC Comics supervillain
- Mr. Impossible, part of the Mr. Men series of books by Roger Hargreaves

== Other uses ==
- Impossible.com, an innovation group and incubator
- Impossible Foods, a company that makes plant-based alternatives to meat
- Impossible object, a type of optical illusion
- Impossible colors, colors that do not appear in ordinary visual functioning
- Impossible Project, the previous name of Polaroid B.V., an instant film camera and film company
- Impossible Pictures (US) or Impossible, a Denver-based production company
- Impossible (novel), by Danielle Steel
- Imposible (wrestler), a Mexican luchador enmascarado (masked professional wrestler)
- Ollie Impossible (or simply "impossible"), a skateboarding trick
- The Impossible (book), by Joyce Smith

== See also ==
- Impossibility (disambiguation)
- Possibility (disambiguation)
