= The Impossible (book) =

2017 book by Joyce Smith

- Author: Joyce Smith
- Language: English
- Genre: Faith drama, non-fiction
- Publication date: November 7, 2017
- Publication place: United States
- Media type: Print (Hardcover & Paperback)
- ISBN: 1478976950
- Website: http://www.theimpossiblebook.com/

The Impossible: The Miraculous Story of a Mother's Faith and Her Child's Resurrection is a non-fiction biography.It was written by American author Joyce Smith, alongside contributor Ginger Kolbaba. The book, released on November 7, 2017, tells the story of Joyce's 14-year-old son John, who fell through icy Lake Sainte Louise, the smaller of two lakes in the community of Lake St. Louis, Missouri.

== Film adaptation ==
In 2018, 20th Century Fox announced plans to produce a movie adaptation of The Impossible, titled Breakthrough, working with director Roxann Dawson, executive producer Samuel Rodriguez and producer DeVon Franklin, who has worked on other faith drama titles such as Miracles from Heaven and Heaven Is for Real. The film was released on April 17, 2019.

In March 2018, it was announced that actor Topher Grace would star as Pastor Jason Noble, and first responder Tommy Shine would be portrayed by Mike Colter. Actress Chrissy Metz of NBC's This Is Us starred as Joyce Smith. Other lead roles include Josh Lucas, Sam Trammell, and Marcel Ruiz.
