= Impossibility =

Impossibility may refer to:

== Philosophy and logic ==
- Epistemic impossibility, in modal logic a statement that cannot be true, given what we know
- Subjunctive impossibility, types of statement that cannot be true based on various types of subjunctive modality
  - Logical impossibility, a statement that contains a logical contradiction
- Impossible world, a concept in philosophical logic

== Other uses ==
- Impossibility of performance, in contract law an excuse for non-performance of a contract
- Impossibility defense, a criminal defense for a crime that was legally impossible to commit
- Proof of impossibility, in mathematics a proof that demonstrates that a particular problem cannot be solved

== See also ==
- Impossible (disambiguation)
- Possibility (disambiguation)
