= Marcel Ruiz =

Marcel Ruiz may refer to:

- Marcel Ruiz (footballer)
- Marcel Ruiz (actor)
