= Possibilities (disambiguation) =

Possibilities is a 2005 jazz album by Herbie Hancock.

Possibilities may also refer to:

- Possibilities (King Never album), a 2010 album by American rock band King Never
- The Possibilities, Athens, Georgia rock band
- "Possibilities" (Knots Landing), a 1982 television episode
- "Possibilities" (Mutant X), a 2004 television episode
- "The Possibilities" (Preacher), a 2016 television episode
- "Possibilities", a song by Memphis May Fire from their 2014 album Unconditional
- "Possibilities", a song by Weezer from their 2002 album Maladroit
- Possibilities: Essays on Hierarchy, Rebellion, and Desire, a 2007 book by David Graeber

== See also ==
- Possibility (disambiguation)
