= Grant Nieporte =

American screenwriter

Grant Edward Nieporte is a screenwriter best known for the film Seven Pounds. Nieporte got the idea for the script after having a chat with a man whom he called "the saddest person I ever met in my life". In the behind the scenes vignette found on the Seven Pounds DVD, Nieporte seems to suggest that the man was responsible for the death of seven in a "national tragedy."

In 2019, Nieporte wrote Breakthrough starring Chrissy Metz, Topher Grace, Marcel Ruiz, Josh Lucas, and Mike Colter for 20th Century Fox and Franklin Entertainment, which grossed over 50 million dollars and won the Dove Award for Best Inspirational Movie of the Year.

Nieporte was a technical advisor for the TV show Home Improvement from 1997 to 1999. He was a writer's assistant on Jack & Jill in 1999–2000. He wrote episodes of the TV series 8 Simple Rules.
