= Possible Worlds =

Possible Worlds may refer to:

- Possible worlds, concept in philosophy
- Possible Worlds (play), 1990 play by John Mighton
  - Possible Worlds (film), 2000 film by Robert Lepage, based on the play
- Possible Worlds (studio)
- Possible Worlds, poetry book by Peter Porter
- Possible Worlds, an essay and book by J. B. S. Haldane
- Possible Worlds, 1995 album by Markus Stockhausen

== See also ==
- Possible (disambiguation)
- World (disambiguation)
