= Breakthrough (2019 film) =

2019 film by Roxann Dawson

- Theatrical release poster
- Directed by: Roxann Dawson
- Written by: Grant Nieporte
- Based on: The Impossible by: Joyce Smith; Ginger Kolbaba
- Produced by: DeVon Franklin
- Starring: Chrissy Metz; Josh Lucas; Topher Grace; Mike Colter; Marcel Ruiz; Dennis Haysbert
- Cinematography: Zoran Popovic
- Edited by: Maysie Hoy
- Music by: Marcelo Zarvos
- Production companies: Fox 2000 Pictures; Franklin Entertainment
- Distributed by: 20th Century Fox
- Release dates: March 20, 2019 (St. Louis); April 17, 2019 (United States)
- Running time: 116 minutes
- Country: United States
- Language: English
- Budget: $14 million
- Box office: $50.4 million

Breakthrough is a 2019 American medical drama film directed by Roxann Dawson in her feature film directorial debut. The film was written by Grant Nieporte, based on the Christian book The Impossible, an account of true events written by Joyce Smith with Ginger Kolbaba. It stars Chrissy Metz, Josh Lucas, Topher Grace, Mike Colter, Marcel Ruiz and Dennis Haysbert. Stephen Curry and Samuel Rodriguez are executive producers.

The film tells the story of a Lake St. Louis teenager who slipped through an icy lake on January 19, 2015, and was underwater for 15 minutes before resuscitative efforts were started. Although he was rescued, he remains in a coma, and his family must rely on their faith to get through the ordeal.

Breakthrough premiered in St. Louis on March 20, 2019, and was released in the United States on April 17, 2019, by 20th Century Fox, as the studio's first feature film after the acquisition of 21st Century Fox by Disney. The film received mixed reviews from critics, who praised the performances and inspirational messages, but called the plot predictable. The film garnered a nomination at the 92nd Academy Awards for Best Original Song.

== Plot ==
Guatemalan 14-year-old John Smith is being raised in Lake St. Louis, Missouri by his adoptive parents, Brian and Joyce. Though they are loving and supportive, John struggles with feelings of abandonment from his birth parents, and rebels against his parents and teachers.

In school, John's class is assigned to give a presentation about their family backgrounds. On his day to present, John admits he did not do the assignment. His basketball coach, who promised him a starting position, warns John that if he gets a failing grade, he will be benched. John later gives a half-hearted presentation, saying that everyone already knows he is adopted, and he does not know much about his true background.

Later, John and his friends Josh and Reiger go out onto a frozen lake, ignoring a neighbor's warning. The resident calls the police, and all three boys fall through the ice. Josh and Reiger swim to the surface and are rescued by first responders. Two of the rescuers dive in, but cannot find John. As they are about to give up, one rescuer, Tommy Shine, hears a voice telling him to go back. Thinking it is his chief, he tries again, and lifts John to the surface.

With no pulse or breath, John is taken to a hospital, where an emergency team works to save his life. After John still fails to register a pulse, attending physician Dr. Sutterer gives Joyce a chance to say goodbye. A weeping Joyce cradles John in her arms, pleading with the Holy Spirit to not let him die. A faint pulse then registers. Sutterer recommends transferring John to a better equipped hospital, citing Dr. Garrett as an expert in cases like John's.

After John is transferred and placed in a medically induced coma, Garrett warns that he has little hope for a recovery, and that if the boy were to pull through, he would likely live in a persistent vegetative state. Jason Noble, the family's new liberal pastor with whom Joyce has frequently clashed, visits the hospital and Joyce slowly warms up to him. Like Joyce, he regards John's progress as divine intervention. John shows some signs of consciousness: he can hear Joyce and Noble and respond with squeezes to the hand, and a tear trickles from his eye as a crowd gathers outside the hospital to sing and pray for his recovery.

Joyce turns John's possible recovery into an obsession, harassing his healthcare professionals and alienating those around her, including Brian. In a heated moment, Joyce tells Brian that if not for her, John would be dead. After a hurtful rebuttal, Brian storms off. Realizing she cannot control John's outcome, Joyce retreats to the roof of the hospital to pray, asking God for forgiveness and submitting to His will. It begins to snow, which she believes is an answer. She and Brian meet with Garrett, who says that the drugs they have been administering are becoming toxic to John's system and may be doing more harm than good. Joyce, who was adamant about saving John's life at all costs, suggests stopping treatment and bringing him out of the coma, stating that she is ready for whatever fate brings. Garrett agrees.

John is revived and regains consciousness, reliving his accident. He hears his mother's voice and opens his eyes, with full cognitive ability. Days later, he is discharged from the hospital, returning home and then back to school.

John's return, though welcomed by many, is met with some resentment by others, who question why John's life was spared while their own loved ones died. This weighs on John's mind, he returns to the lake. There he sees Tommy Shine, and thanks him for saving his life. Tommy admits that he did not believe in God until after a series of protracted events since John's accident, and all he did was pull John from the water.

John reconciles his survival with a renewed sense of purpose in his life, and rebuilds his relationships with those he had been alienating. After graduating from high school, John pursues a career in ministry.

== Cast ==
- Chrissy Metz as Joyce Smith, a highly devout Christian woman, Brian's wife and John's adoptive mother.
- Josh Lucas as Brian Smith, Joyce's husband and John's adoptive father.
- Topher Grace as Pastor Jason Noble, Paula's husband, the father of their son and daughter and the local pastor who tries to connect with the youth.
- Mike Colter as Tommy Shine, a first responder who had a moment with God to save John.
- Marcel Ruiz as John Smith, Joyce and Brian's Guatemalan 14-year-old adoptive son who makes a miraculous recovery.
- Sam Trammell as Kent Sutterer, Abby's father.
- Dennis Haysbert as Dr. Garrett
- Maddy Martin as Abby Sutterer, Kent Sutterer's daughter and John's love interest.
- Isaac Kragten as Josh, one of John's friends.
- Nikolas Dukic as Reiger, one of John's friends.
- Travis Bryant as Jonah, one of John's friends.
- Taylor Mosby as Chayla, one of John's friends.
- Ali Skovbye as Emma, one of John's friends.
- Chuck Shamata as Fire Chief
- Nancy Sorel as Mrs. Abbott, the Family History teacher at the Christian middle school John and his friends attend.
- Lisa Durupt as Paula Noble, Pastor Jason's wife and mother of his son and daughter.
- Rebecca Staab as Cindy Rieger.

== Production ==
Producer DeVon Franklin helped the Smith family find a literary agent and then develop the book in a film after it was published. The movie was filmed in Manitoba from March to May 2018. Locations for the 31-day shoot included Winnipeg, Selkirk, and Portage la Prairie.

== Marketing ==
An official trailer for the film was released on December 5, 2018, and received more than 30 million views within two days, becoming the most-viewed trailer for a religious film within that timespan.

Metz performed "I'm Standing with You" from the film's soundtrack at the 54th Academy of Country Music Awards alongside Carrie Underwood, Lauren Alaina, Maddie & Tae and Mickey Guyton.

== Release ==
Breakthrough was released in the United States by 20th Century Fox on April 17, 2019; it is also the first film from Fox under the ownership of The Walt Disney Company after its acquisition of 21st Century Fox on March 20, 2019. The Easter weekend it was released had the lowest box office receipts since 2005 because studios chose to avoid any major release during that period so as not to compete with Disney's other release of Avengers: Endgame the following weekend.

The film was released on DVD, Blu-ray and 4K Blu-ray by 20th Century Fox Home Entertainment which became the label of Walt Disney Studios Home Entertainment on July 16, 2019.

== Reception ==
=== Box office ===
Breakthrough grossed $40.7 million in the United States and Canada, and $9.7 million in other territories (including $5.9 million in Brazil), for a worldwide total of $50.4 million.

In the United States and Canada, the film was released alongside Disney's other release, Penguins, and was projected to gross $13–17 million from 2,300 theaters in its five-day opening weekend. The film made $1.9 million on its first day and $1.5 million on its second. It went on to debut to $11.3 million (a five-day total of $14.6 million), finishing third behind The Curse of La Llorona and Shazam!. In its second weekend the film fell 39% to $6.8 million, finishing fourth.

=== Critical response ===
According to the review aggregator Rotten Tomatoes, 60% of critics have given the film a positive review based on 65 reviews; the average rating is 5.60/10. The website's critics consensus reads, "Like its lead character, Breakthrough is fiercely focused on faith – but its less subtle elements are balanced by strong performances and an uplifting story." At Metacritic, the film has a weighted average score of 46 out of 100, based on 17 critics, indicating "mixed or average" reviews. Audiences polled by CinemaScore gave the film an average grade of "A" on an A+ to F scale, while those at PostTrak gave it a 4.5 out of 5 stars and a "definite recommend" of 69%.

== Accolades ==
Awards Ceremony	Category	Recipient(s)	Result	References
Academy Awards	Best Original Song	"I'm Standing with You"	Nominated	
Critics' Choice Movie Awards	Best Song	"I'm Standing with You"	Nominated	
GMA Dove Awards	Inspirational Film of the Year	Breakthrough	Won	
Movieguide Awards	Best Movie For Families	Breakthrough	Nominated	
Movieguide Awards	Epiphany Prize for Inspiring Movies	Breakthrough	Nominated	
Movieguide Awards	Grace Prize	Chrissy Metz, for her role as Joyce Smith	Nominated	
