= Seven Pounds =

2008 American drama film by Gabriele Muccino

- Theatrical release poster
- Directed by: Gabriele Muccino
- Written by: Grant Nieporte
- Produced by: Todd Black; James Lassiter; Jason Blumenthal; Steve Tisch; Will Smith
- Starring: Will Smith; Rosario Dawson; Michael Ealy; Barry Pepper; Woody Harrelson
- Cinematography: Philippe Le Sourd
- Edited by: Hughes Winborne
- Music by: Angelo Milli
- Production companies: Columbia Pictures; Relativity Media; Overbrook Entertainment; Escape Artists
- Distributed by: Sony Pictures Releasing
- Release date: December 19, 2008
- Running time: 123 minutes
- Country: United States
- Language: English
- Budget: $54 million
- Box office: $169.7 million

Seven Pounds is a 2008 American psychological drama film directed by Gabriele Muccino, written by Grant Nieporte, and starring Will Smith as a man who sets out to change the lives of seven people; Rosario Dawson, Woody Harrelson, and Barry Pepper also star. The film was released in theaters in the United States of America on December 19, 2008, by Columbia Pictures. Despite receiving negative reviews from critics, it was a box-office success, grossing $169.7 million worldwide against a production budget of $54 million.

== Plot ==
Tim Thomas, sending a text message while driving, caused a car crash in which seven people died: six strangers and his fiancée, Sarah Jenson. In a bid for redemption, and unable to live with the guilt of his actions, Tim sets out to save the lives of seven good people.

A year after the crash, having quit his job as an aeronautical engineer, Tim donates a lung lobe to his brother Ben, an IRS employee. Six months later he donates part of his liver to social services worker Holly. After that, he begins searching for more candidates to receive donations. He finds George, a junior hockey coach, and donates a kidney to him, and donates bone marrow to a young boy, Nicholas.

Tim contacts Holly and asks if she knows anyone who deserves help. She suggests Connie Tepos, who lives with an abusive boyfriend, so he gives her his number in case she wants his help. Tim moves out of his house and into a local motel, taking with him his pet box jellyfish. One night, after being beaten, Connie contacts Tim, who gives her the keys and deed to his beach house. She takes her two children and they move into their new home. Eventually Smiths characters reflects on his actions

Having stolen his brother's credentials, and presenting himself as Ben, Tim checks out candidates for his two final donations. The first is Ezra Turner, a blind meat salesman and pianist. Tim calls him at work, harassing him, to check if he is quick to anger. Ezra remains calm, so Tim decides he is worthy.

He then contacts Emily Posa, a self-employed greeting card printer who has a heart condition and a rare blood type. Tim spends time with her, weeding her garden and fixing her rare Heidelberg Windmill press. He begins to fall in love with her and decides that, as her condition has worsened, he needs to make his donation.

Ben tracks down Tim at Emily's, demanding that Tim return his IRS credentials. After an interlude with Emily, Tim leaves her sleeping and returns to the motel. He fills the bathtub with ice water to preserve his vital organs, climbs in, and kills himself by pulling his box jellyfish into the water with him. His friend Dan acts as executor to ensure that his organs are donated, his heart to Emily and his corneas to Ezra.

Afterward, Emily meets Ezra at his concert at a park, and they begin to talk.

== Cast ==
- Will Smith as Tim Thomas
- Michael Ealy as Ben Thomas, Tim's brother.

Will Smith handpicked Ealy for the role of the main character's brother. Connor Cruise, the adopted son of actor Tom Cruise and actress Nicole Kidman, was cast in his first role as a younger version of Ben Thomas.

- Barry Pepper as Dan Morris
- Rosario Dawson as Emily Posa
- Octavia Spencer as Kate, Emily's nurse
- Tim Kelleher as Stewart Goodman
- Woody Harrelson as Ezra Turner
- Elpidia Carrillo as Connie Tepos
- Judyann Elder as Holly
- Bill Smitrovich as George
- Quintin Kelly as Nicholas
- Robinne Lee as Sarah Jenson, Tim's fiancée
- Madison Pettis as Connie's daughter
- Ivan Angulo as Connie's son
- Skylan Brooks as Choir kid
- Bryce J Harris as a toddler in the social service office
- Weston Harris as a child in the social service office

== Production ==
Seven Pounds is based on a script written by Grant Nieporte under Columbia Pictures. In June 2007, Will Smith joined the studio to star in the planned film and to serve as one of its producers. In September 2007, director Gabriele Muccino, who worked with Smith on The Pursuit of Happyness (2006), was attached to direct Seven Pounds, bringing along his creative team from the 2006 film. Smith was joined by Rosario Dawson and Woody Harrelson the following December to star in Seven Pounds. Filming began in February 2008.

Smith described the reason he took on the role:

Usually with the films that I make there are ideas that I connect to, but lately I've been dealing with the bittersweet in life because it feels more natural. You don't ever get it really the way you want in life. That really fascinates me. As an actor, there are certain parts of a character that you create, and you train yourself to have those reactions and then it becomes hard to stop them when the role is over. You have to retrain yourself. My character in this film is like hot grits. You know you can't shake them off and when you do, it hurts.

Smith felt that the character needed to be a quiet and rather introverted person who does not burn himself out at every possible instance. The character was a contrast to Smith's previous characters, and Smith felt that director Gabriele Muccino's trust in him helped him relax and avoid overextending himself. Smith acknowledged Seven Pounds as a drama film, but he saw it as more of a love story.

Most of the film was shot in Los Angeles, Pasadena, and Malibu, California. Points of interest used in the film include the Travel Inn in Tujunga, California, the Colorado Bar, the Huntington Library, the Sheraton, and the Pasadena Ice Skating Rink all in Pasadena, as well as Malibu Beach in Malibu.

=== Title ===
Before the film's release, the title Seven Pounds was considered a "mystery" which the studio refused to explain. Early trailers for Seven Pounds kept the film's details a mystery. Director Gabriele Muccino explained the intent: "The [audience] will not know exactly what this man is up to." In an interview Will Smith said that the title is a reference to Shakespeare's The Merchant of Venice, in which a debtor must pay a pound of flesh. In this case, it amounts to seven gifts to seven individuals deemed worthy by Smith's character, to atone for seven deaths he caused.

== Release ==
=== Box office ===
Seven Pounds was promoted on a five-city tour across the United States in November 2008, screening in Cleveland, Miami, Dallas, St. Louis, and Denver to raise funds for food banks in each region. The film was promoted at a charity screening in Minneapolis in support of Second Harvest Heartland. Since screenings of new films usually took place in Los Angeles or New York City, the choice of cities was unconventional. Smith said, "This is more like the old-school music tours. Different clubs, different cities, meeting people. You get in touch with what people are feeling and thinking, and it's much more personal when you're actually out shaking hands." The actor sought to "get reacquainted" with an America that he felt had an "openness to change" with the country's election of Barack Obama as the first African-American president.

The film was released on December 19, 2008, to 2,758 theaters in the United States and Canada. It grossed an estimated US$16 million, placing second at the weekend box office after Yes Man. The opening gross was the lowest for a film starring Smith since Ali in 2001. The gross was US$5 million less than anticipated, partially ascribed to winter storms in the Northeast over the weekend.

=== Critical reception ===
The film received generally negative reviews from critics. Rotten Tomatoes gave the film a rating of 26% based upon a sample of 191 reviews with an average rating of 4.7/10. The website's critics consensus reads, "Grim and morose, Seven Pounds is also undone by an illogical plot." On Metacritic, the film has a weighted average score of 36 out of 100 based on reviews from 33 critics, indicating "generally unfavorable reviews".

Variety's film reviewer Todd McCarthy predicted that the movie's climax "will be emotionally devastating for many viewers, perhaps particularly those with serious religious beliefs," and characterized the film as an "endlessly sentimental fable about sacrifice and redemption that aims only at the heart at the expense of the head." A. O. Scott, writing for The New York Times, said that the movie "may be among the most transcendently, eye-poppingly, call-your-friend-ranting-in-the-middle-of-the-night-just-to-go-over-it-one-more-time crazily awful motion pictures ever made."

Positive reviews singled out Dawson's performance. Richard Corliss wrote in Time that Dawson gives "a lovely performance," while Mick LaSalle of the San Francisco Chronicle noted that Dawson's performance "shows once again that she has it in her to be the powerhouse." Roger Ebert of the Chicago Sun Times commented on the fact that the audience is kept completely out of the loop as to what Tim is doing, comparing the film to Jean-Pierre Melville's Le Samouraï, pointing out how he "finds this more interesting than a movie about a man whose nature and objectives are made clear in the first five minutes, in a plot that simply points him straight ahead."

=== Home media ===
The film was released on DVD on March 31, 2009, by Sony Pictures Home Entertainment. The film is also available to rent or buy on the PlayStation Network in standard or high-definition format. As of July 16, 2012, in North American DVD sales, the film grossed US$28,812,423.
