= List of This Is Us characters =

Listing of characters on American television series This Is Us

This Is Us is an American television series created by Dan Fogelman that premiered on NBC on September 20, 2016. The ensemble cast stars Milo Ventimiglia, Mandy Moore, Sterling K. Brown, Chrissy Metz, Justin Hartley, Susan Kelechi Watson, Chris Sullivan, and Ron Cephas Jones.

== Overview ==
= Main cast (credited)
= Recurring cast (4+)
= Guest cast (1-3)

Character	Portrayed by	Seasons					
Character	Portrayed by	1	2	3	4	5	6
Main characters
Jack Pearson	Milo Ventimiglia	Main	Main	Main	Main	Main	Main
Rebecca Pearson	Mandy Moore	Main	Main	Main	Main	Main	Main
Randall Pearson	Sterling K. Brown	Main	Main	Main	Main	Main	Main
Randall Pearson	Niles Fitch	Recurring	Main	Main	Main	Main	Main
Randall Pearson	Lonnie Chavis	Recurring	Main (Note: In season 2, Chavis is credited only in the episodes in which he appears.) (Note: In season 6, Chavis, Hancsicsak and Bates only appear in the series finale, where they are credited as main cast members.)	Main	Main	Main	Main
Kate Pearson	Chrissy Metz	Main	Main	Main	Main	Main	Main
Kate Pearson	Hannah Zeile	Recurring	Main	Main	Main	Main	Main
Kate Pearson	Mackenzie Hancsicsak	Recurring	Main	Main	Main	Main	Main
Kevin Pearson	Justin Hartley	Main	Main	Main	Main	Main	Main
Kevin Pearson	Logan Shroyer	Recurring	Main	Main	Main	Main	Main
Kevin Pearson	Parker Bates	Recurring	Main	Main	Main	Main	Main
Beth Pearson	Susan Kelechi Watson	Main	Main	Main	Main	Main	Main
Toby Damon	Chris Sullivan	Main	Main	Main	Main	Main	Main
William H. "Shakespeare" Hill	Ron Cephas Jones	Main	Main	Special Guest	Special Guest	Special Guest	Special Guest
Miguel Rivas	Jon Huertas	Recurring	Main	Main	Main	Main	Main
Sophie Inman	Alexandra Breckenridge	Recurring	Main	Special Guest	Special Guest	Special Guest	Recurring
Tess Pearson	Eris Baker	Recurring	Main	Main	Main	Main	Main
Annie Pearson	Faithe Herman	Recurring	Main	Main	Main	Main	Main
Zoe Baker	Melanie Liburd		Guest	Main		Special; Guest	
Deja Andrews	Lyric Ross		Recurring	Main	Main	Main	Main
Nicholas "Nicky" Pearson	Griffin Dunne			Recurring	Main	Special Guest	Main
Malik Hodges	Asante Blackk				Main	Main	Main
Madison Simons	Caitlin Thompson	Recurring	Recurring	Recurring	Recurring	Main	Main
Philip	Chris Geere					Guest	Main
Recurring characters
Dr. Nathan Katowsky ("Dr. K")	Gerald McRaney	Recurring	Recurring		Guest		Guest
Olivia Maine	Janet Montgomery	Recurring					
Sloane Sandburg	Milana Vayntrub	Recurring					
Yvette	Ryan Michelle Bathe	Recurring		Recurring			
Jessie	Denis O'Hare	Recurring		Guest			
Duke	Adam Bartley	Recurring					
Laurie	Jill Johnson	Recurring	Recurring				
Tyler	John Pollono	Recurring					
Linda	Debra Jo Rupp		Recurring				
Shauna	Joy Brunson		Recurring	Guest	Guest		
Allison Walsh	Isabel Oliver Marcus		Recurring	Guest			
Stanley Pearson	Peter Onorati	Guest	Guest	Recurring	Guest	Recurring	Guest
Jae-Won	Tim Jo			Recurring	Recurring	Guest	Guest
Murphy	Peter Falls			Recurring			
Townie	Alvin Cowan			Recurring		Guest	
Sky	Drew Olivia Tillman			Recurring	Guest		
Cassidy Sharp	Jennifer Morrison				Recurring	Special Guest	Special Guest
Mr. Cory Lawrence	Brandon Scott				Recurring		
Gregory	Timothy Omundson				Recurring	Guest	Guest
Jack Damon	Blake Stadnik				Recurring		Recurring
Austin Abrams	Marc McKeon				Recurring	Guest	
Lucy Damon	Auden Thornton				Recurring		Recurring
Shay	Aynsley Bubbico				Recurring	Guest	
Matty Sharp	Noah Salsbury Lipson				Recurring		Guest
Laurel Dubois	Jennifer C. Holmes	Guest	Guest			Recurring	
Carol Clarke	Phylicia Rashad			Guest	Guest	Recurring	Recurring
Hai Lang	Vien Hong					Recurring	
'The Manny'	Mike Manning						Recurring
Edie	Vanessa Bell Calloway						Recurring
Elijah	Adam Korson						Recurring
Jack Jr.	Johnny Kincaid						Recurring

== Main characters ==
=== Family tree ===
The characters in green have or had regular roles on the show. Dotted lines indicate a parental relationship through adoption, and dashed lines indicate either divorced, or widowed (or similarly separated), characters.

Evaristo Herrera "Risto" Rivas (1923–2008)	Beatriz; Rivas	Dave; Malone	Janet; Malone	Stanley; Pearson (1912–1988)	Marilyn; Pearson (1920–1986)
Shelly	Miguel; Rivas (c.1944–late 2020s)	Rebecca; Pearson (1951–2033)	Jack; Pearson (1944–1998)	Nicky; Pearson (b. 1948)	Edie	William; Hill (1954–2017)	Laurel; Dubois (1950s–2015)	Abe; Clarke (1940s–1997)	Carol; Clarke (b. 1940s)
Andy; Rivas	Amber; Rivas	Shauna; Andrews (b. 1989)
Grant	Sophie; Inman (b. 1980)	Kevin; Pearson (b. 1980)	Madison; Simons (b. 1987)	Elijah	Toby; Damon (b. 1976)	Kate; Pearson (b. 1980)	Philip	Randall; Pearson (b. 1980)	Beth; Pearson (b. 1980)
Frances; Pearson (b. 2020)	Nicholas; Pearson (b. 2020)	Jack; Damon (b. 2019)	Lucy; Damon	Hailey Rose; Damon (b. 2020)	Tess; Pearson (b. 2008)	Annie; Pearson (b. 2010)	Deja; Pearson (b. 2005)
Hope; Damon (b. 2040s)

=== Jack Pearson ===
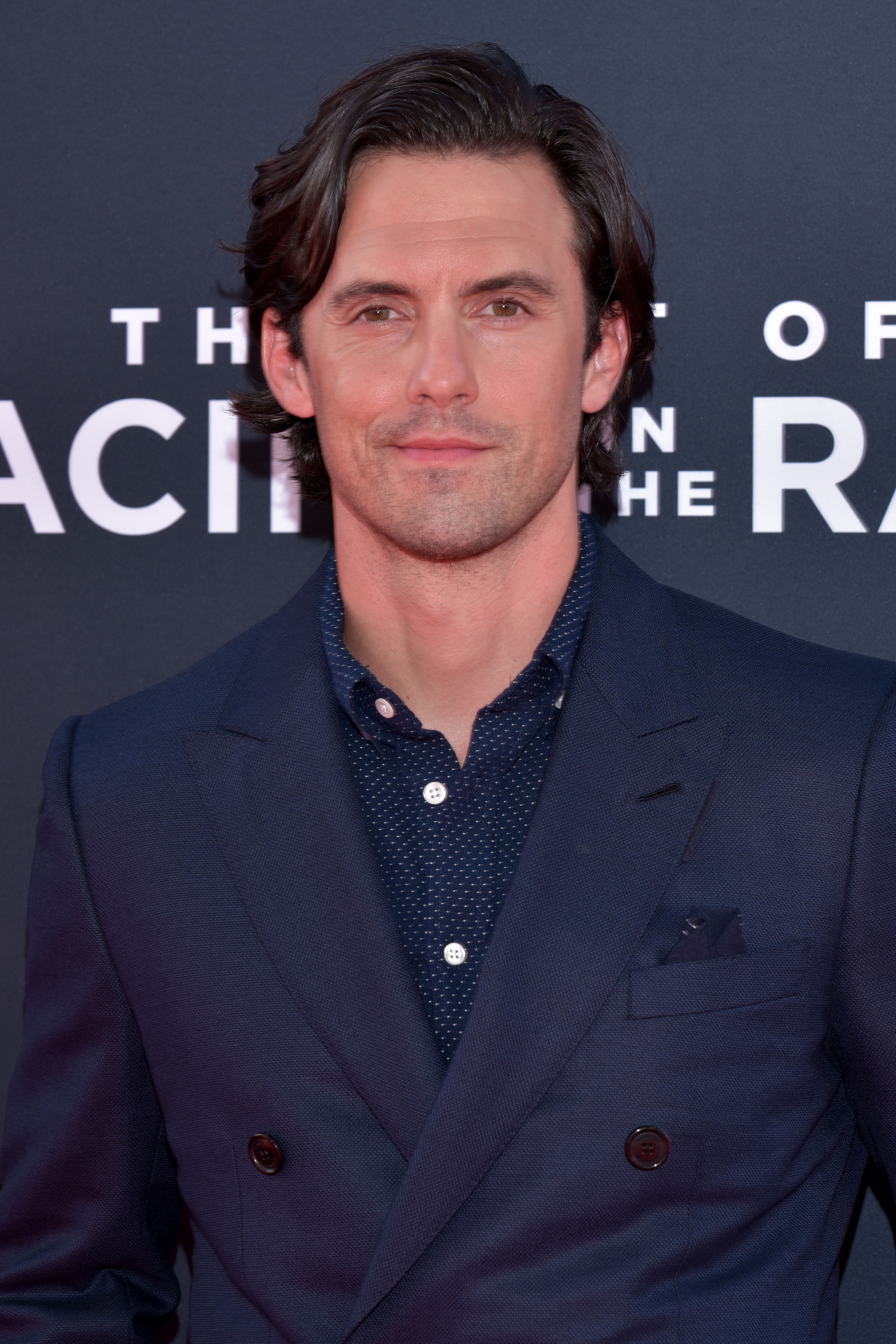
Milo Ventimiglia in 2019

Jack Pearson (August 31, 1944 – January 26, 1998), portrayed by Milo Ventimiglia, is Rebecca's first husband (until he dies), and the father of Kevin, Kate, and Randall. Jack had a brother named Nick.

Jack had a rough childhood because of his abusive, alcoholic father Stanley Pearson, causing them to have a strained relationship. Stanley does not know that Jack has married, so when Jack finds out that he and Rebecca are expecting triplets, he goes to his father asking for money, citing gambling debts, rather than telling him that he intends to buy a house for his family. When Stanley is in the nursing home dying, he meets Rebecca and his granddaughter Kate for the first time. Jack is camping with Kevin and Randall when Rebecca contacts him about his father dying, but Jack refuses to see him.

Jack meets Rebecca two days before Christmas in 1972, and takes her on a date to a carnival; a date that goes awry. Despite that, Rebecca kisses him. The next week they take a trip to Los Angeles and start sleeping together.

Jack enlists in the U.S. Army after his younger brother Nick is drafted. Jack and Nick experience a falling out during the Vietnam War, and Nick is discharged for psychiatric reasons following a tragic accident. From then on, Jack no longer spoke to his brother, and for the rest of his life and for years after his death, Rebecca and the Pearson children believed Jack's lie that Nicky had died in the war. (After Jack takes Randall to Washington, D.C., on a college tour to Howard University, he takes Randall to the Vietnam Veterans Memorial, and tells him how the war affected him; this may be the first time that Jack has shared about his Vietnam experiences to a member of the Pearson family—including Rebecca.)

After serving in the war, and working as a manual laborer, Jack becomes a construction foreman. When he wants to buy the house for his family, he approaches his boss and gets a raise to $17,000 a year (equivalent to more than $49,000 in 2016), making him the highest paid foreman at the company. He dreams of opening his own firm, "Big Three Homes", but puts his dreams on hold in order to provide a steady income for his children by getting a desk job. However, he later decides to start the business, though the Big Three are about to start college.

Two of the triplets (the third triplet, Kyle, was stillborn) and Randall (who had been left at a fire station) are all born on Jack's 36th birthday. Jack always wanted to find out who Randall's biological father was, and never knew that Rebecca had found him.

Jack struggles with alcoholism while the children are young, but he stops drinking to focus more on his family. (Sometimes he vents his anger on a punching bag to avoid drinking after a tough day.) However, he relapses into alcoholism when he has a drink after a disagreement and argument with his wife, who wants to go on tour with a band with a member she'd once dated. His drinking continues for some time until he decides to deal with the problem by attending AA meetings. His sobriety and AA work continue for at least 6 months.

Jack dies when his children are 17, and Kate keeps his ashes with her. On the night of the Super Bowl, Jack, Rebecca, Kate, and Randall go to bed for the night (Kevin is at a party with his girlfriend Sophie). Previously, a smoke alarm was shown to be missing batteries, and thus was inoperable. An old slow cooker given years previous by a neighbor is shown to have a faulty switch, which sparks and flames, setting a towel and the house ablaze.

Jack saves Kate and Randall from the fire by guiding them to his and Rebecca's bedroom. He then hoists them down from the first story roof. Kate is worried about her dog, so Jack goes back inside and gets the dog and family pictures. Jack is hospitalized for smoke inhalation, which causes stress on his heart and eventually causes sudden, fatal cardiac arrest.

- Jack's childhood and teen years are seen in flashbacks beginning in the first season, with Darren Barnet portraying Jack in his teens, Joaquin Obradors portraying Jack at age 8, and Milo Cragnotti as Jack at age 4.

=== Rebecca Pearson ===
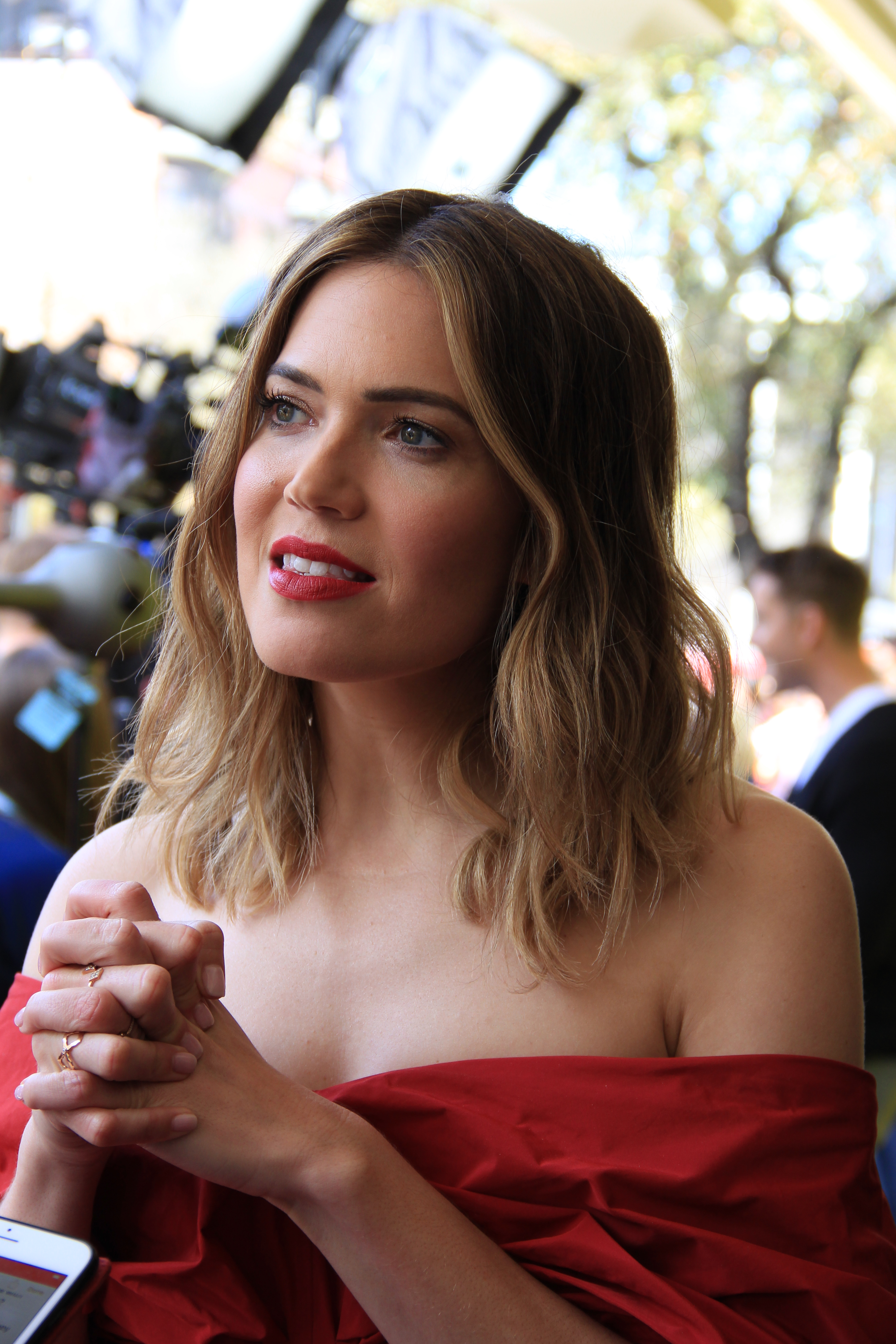
Mandy Moore

Rebecca Pearson née Malone (February 2, 1951 – 2033), portrayed by Mandy Moore, is Jack's widow, later Miguel Rivas' second wife, and the mother of Kevin, Kate, and Randall.

She strives to be a better mother to her children, and has issues with Jack's alcoholism. She has always known that William is Randall's father, but keeps them apart as she was afraid that he would try to take Randall back.

Rebecca always wanted to be a singer, but gives up on her dreams in order to focus on her family. In the mid-1990s, she has a chance to become a singer again by joining a band with her ex-boyfriend. Jack is upset after finding out about their history, which causes a rift between Rebecca and Jack.

When the house catches fire and Jack suffers smoke inhalation, at the hospital, since Jack appears to be fine, Rebecca is making reservations for hotel rooms—unaware that Jack is coding and staff are rushing to him. After making reservations, Rebecca gets a candy bar for her and Jack. Rebecca turns around and the doctor explains the cause of Jack's cardiac arrest. In shock, Rebecca takes a bite of the candy bar, refusing to believe Jack is dead. She goes to his room to tell him what the doctor said, only to see him lifeless. She immediately shuts down upon seeing him dead. She then drives to Miguel's and tells him the news, then goes in to talk to Kate and Randall.

Since she was out of Jack's room when he died, Rebecca gets the Pearsons to the funeral early, because she wants to be present when the urn with Jack's ashes are brought out. After Jack's funeral, Dr. K lets Rebecca know that she has always been strong. This encouragement gives her the strength to let Kevin and Randall know that neither of them need to be "the man of the house", since they are teenagers and should be dating, and tells Kate not to blame herself for Jack's death because Jack made his own decisions. She also gets the courage to drive across a bridge she has feared, while taking the "Big Three" to a Bruce Springsteen concert that Jack had previously obtained tickets for the night of the funeral.

At least 10 years after Jack's death, Rebecca posts pictures of Tess, her first grandchild, on Facebook, then gets a message from Jack's best friend, Miguel Rivas. Many years after, Rebecca and Miguel reconnect, and eventually they marry.

- Rebecca's childhood years are seen in flashbacks beginning in the first season, with Ava Castro portraying Rebecca in mid-childhood, and Kya Kruse portraying Rebecca in early childhood.

=== Kevin Pearson ===
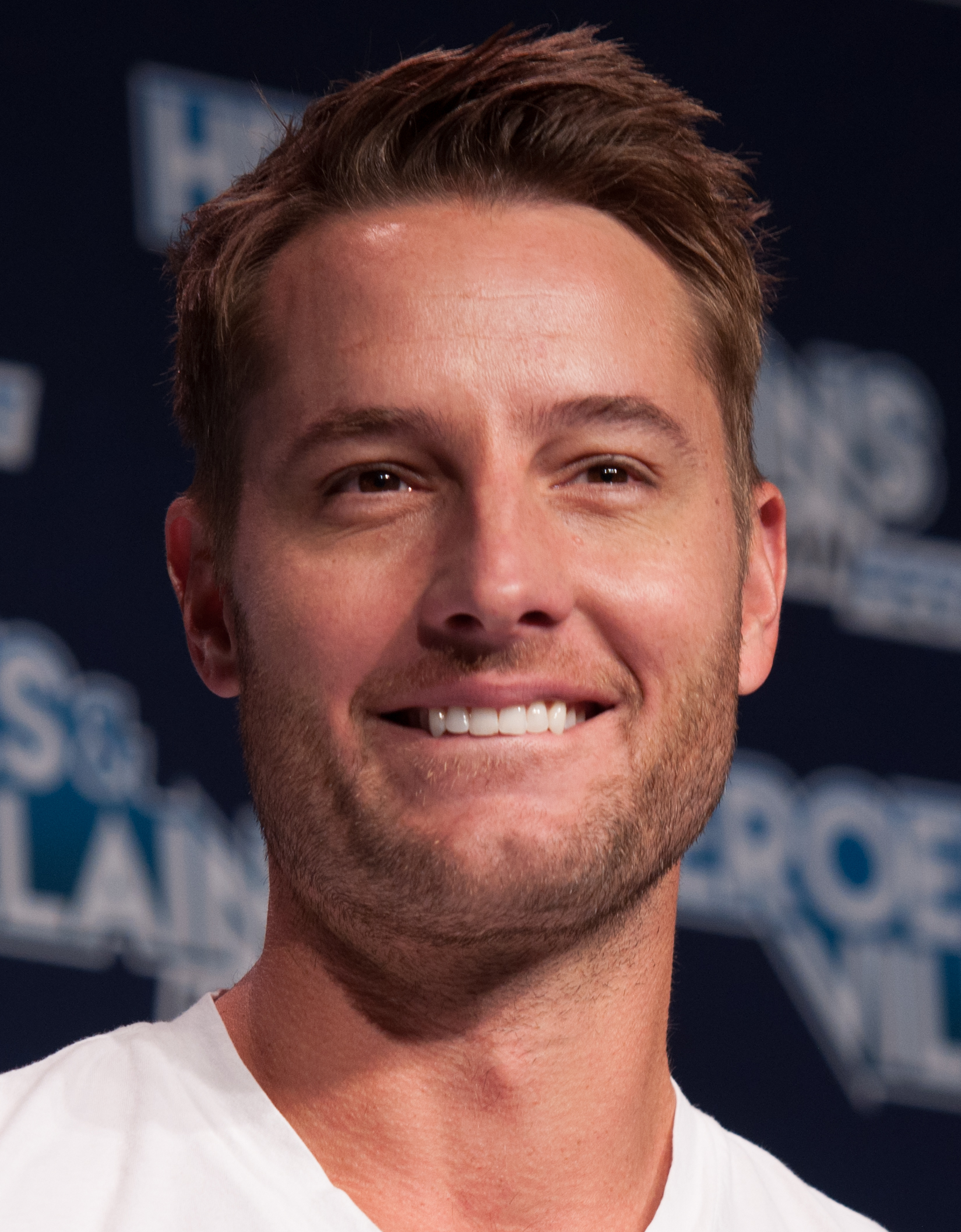
Justin Hartley in 2017

Kevin Pearson (born August 31, 1980), portrayed by Justin Hartley (current day), Logan Shroyer (age 15–17), and Parker Bates (ages 8–10), is Jack and Rebecca's son, and Kate and Randall's brother. He is "Number One" of the "Big Three", being the first of the surviving triplets to be born.

Shortly before his tenth birthday, Kevin becomes attracted to Kate's best friend, Sophie, whom he marries when they are older. Kevin and Sophie decide that she will stay in New York and he will move to California to pursue acting, believing that their marriage can handle the distance. Kevin and Sophie later divorce, 12 years prior to season 1, due to the distance and Kevin cheating on her.

Kevin has always struggled with worrying about what people think of him, which causes him to have a strained relationship with Randall as they grow up. Kevin is visibly envious of Randall, who has always excelled in everything and receives more attention from their parents, but he does not realize that Randall has longed for the same attention from him. In high school he plays football, as a quarterback, wearing number twelve one year and number one the next. (His number one jersey is on display with Kevin's trophies when he visits the high school at age 37, for an alumni celebration.) His goal of a football career ends when his knee is injured from a tackle during a game.

When the series starts, Kevin is an actor in Los Angeles, starring as the lead on a long-running sitcom called The Manny, a sitcom in the tradition of Who's the Boss and The Nanny. He abruptly quits that show on his 36th birthday, criticizing the script quality, the producer's reluctance to add nuance to the show, and the audience. After quitting his job, Kevin decides to move to New York to pursue a career as a serious stage actor on Broadway. Upon arriving in New York, he gets hired as the lead role, David, in Back of an Egg, opposite a cynical actress named Olivia Maine (who thinks Kevin does not have the ability, but that he was hired because his being "The Manny" will sell tickets).

When Kevin has trouble connecting with the emotions needed for his role, he begins spending time with Olivia, who tries to get him to connect with his feelings. Kevin and Olivia briefly date, but break up after she brings her ex-boyfriend to the Pearson family cabin. After his breakup with Olivia, Kevin begins dating the writer of the play, Sloane Sandburg, attending Hanukkah with her family and inviting her to the Christmas Eve party at Randall's house.

Sloane takes over as the lead of the play when Olivia disappears and the play is at risk. Kevin decides to self-fund the performance, in order to save it. After Kevin and Sloane break up, he reconnects with Sophie and begins a relationship with her again.

Director Ron Howard sees Kevin's play and casts him in a war movie. Kevin has trouble with his lines when he cannot focus after Kate (visiting the set) talks with costar Sylvester Stallone about her dad, and then Stallone talks to Kevin about his dad. Kevin also re-injures his knee (an old football injury) during an explosion scene on the movie set.

As a result of the injury, Kevin becomes addicted to pain medication and alcohol, and allows his relationship with Sophie to deteriorate by telling her that he saw a future with her as a nightmare, although he fails to specify that this was due to his alcoholism and drug addiction. One day after a brief visit with Randall, Kevin is speeding down a road, unaware that Tess is hiding in the back seat; Kevin is pulled over and charged with DUI, and Randall and Beth are furious with Kevin for endangering Tess. The judge orders Kevin to go to rehab.

As part of Kevin's ongoing efforts to rehabilitate, he is determined to make amends with everyone. He settles things with his mom (who was hurt during the rehab family session, tearfully revealing that Kevin was the first to leave after Jack's death). Kevin finds out from Miguel that the thought of his being in love with Rebecca never crossed his mind while Jack was alive, and Miguel reassures him that he loves Rebecca now and is not going anywhere. When Kevin attempts to make things right with Sophie, she tells him to not say anything and to just leave her with the memories of how he was at 10, or 17, or when their marriage was good. Kevin reconciles with Randall by helping him fix up the apartment building William lived in, and the two share with each other how odd it feels that they could outlive their dad. On Super Bowl Sunday, about 20 years after Jack's death, Kevin visits the memorial tree with some of his dad's ashes, to talk with him, vowing to make him proud. (Kevin was at a party with Sophie when the house caught fire.)

Following his war movie, Kevin becomes obsessed with learning about Jack's time in the Vietnam War, and with the aid of Zoe Baker, Beth's cousin, with whom he falls in love, he travels to Vietnam in an attempt to learn about Jack's history, and ends up discovering his long-believed-dead uncle Nicky. After finding Nicky in his old run down trailer, he offers to help him get back on track, but he refuses. This triggers him to relapse after a year sober. At the end of season three, Kevin and Zoe break up after Zoe tells Kevin that she will never want kids. As season four begins, Kevin bails Nicky out of jail after a relapse, then buys his own trailer next to Nicky's in order to bond with him, eventually meeting and starting to get close to Marine veteran and fellow AA member Cassidy Sharp: they have a one-night stand but eventually part ways, Kevin even helping her mend fences with her estranged husband. Kevin eventually has a one-night stand with Kate's best friend, Madison, which results in the conception of twins: Kevin commits to being there for Madison and the two babies, and they eventually become a couple after quarantining together during the COVID-19 pandemic, but Madison breaks up with Kevin on their wedding day. Rebecca then gives Kevin a "project" to do for her, of building the house that Jack never got to build her.

In Season 6, Kevin originally continues to live in Madison's garage, but ultimately moves in with Kate and Toby (to their frustration) to give Madison more space. He also struggles with the idea of losing the opportunity to have his "perfect family", which is intensified by Madison's new relationship with Elijah. At the same time, he, along with Cassidy and Nicky, starts the company Big Three Homes, employing veterans to build homes, starting with the house he builds for Rebecca, which grows into a successful company by 2026. He eventually manages to accept Elijah, and he and Madison grow into a better relationship as co-parents and friends. After dating a series of insubstantial women, he encounters Sophie at Kate's engagement party, who is married to Grant. The night before Kate's wedding, he and Sophie reconnect, and he learns that she is now divorced from Grant. After encounters with the wedding singer and Cassidy the same night, and a pep talk from Randall the next day, Kevin reconciles with Sophie after Kate's wedding, revealing he has always kept the valentine he made her the first day she walked into his class. The two kiss, to the family's applause. The two ultimately remarry at some point before Miguel's death, and Sophie moves to LA to be with Kevin. After Miguel's death, Kevin and Sophie decide to move into the house Kevin built to care for Rebecca, with Madison and Elijah following suit so Kevin can still be close to his kids.

- Parker Sands portrays Kevin at age 4 during the third season episode "The Graduates".

=== Kate Pearson ===
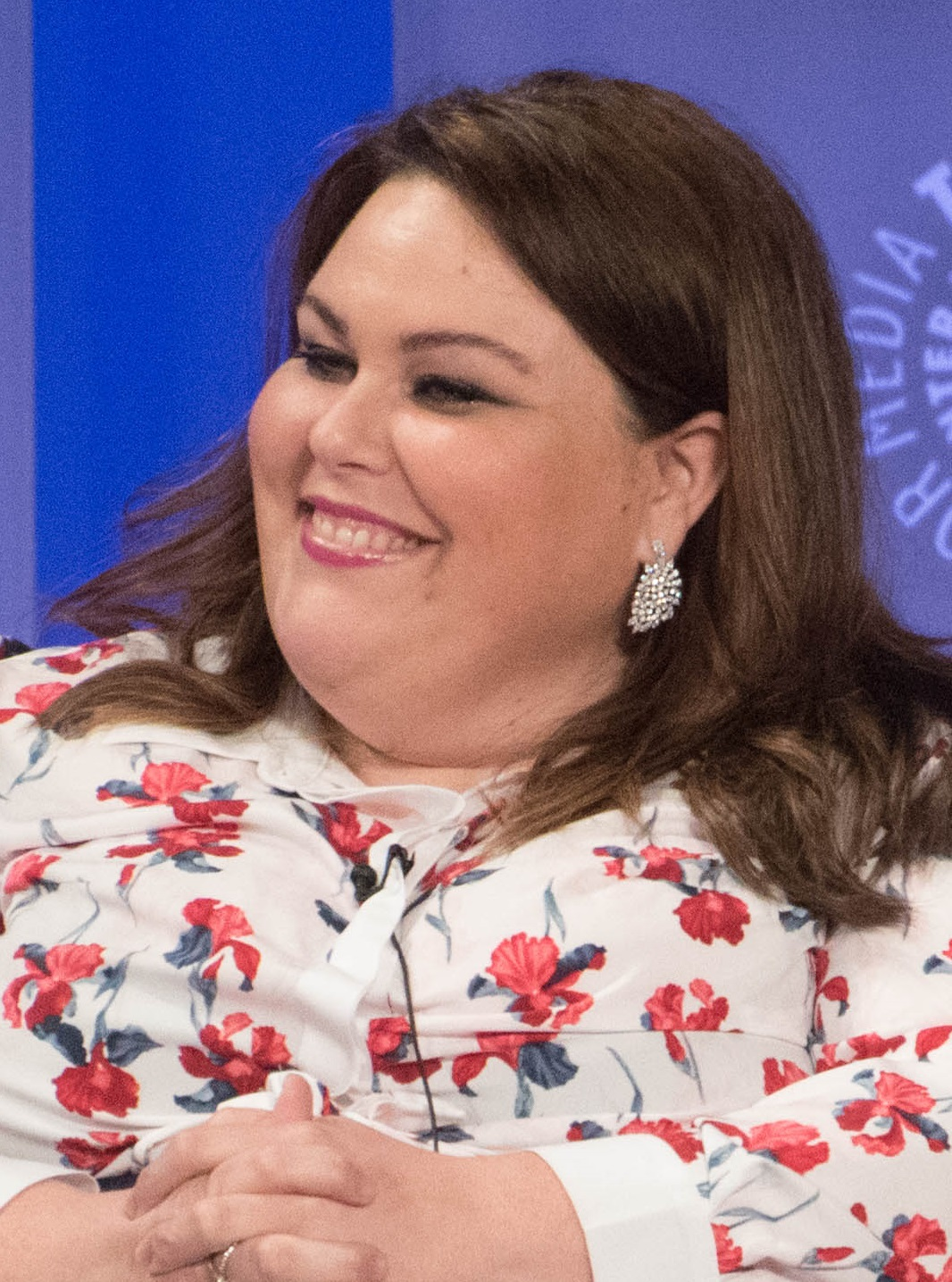
Chrissy Metz

Kate Emily Pearson, nicknamed "Bug" by her mother (born August 31, 1980), portrayed by Chrissy Metz (current day), Hannah Zeile (age 15–17), and Mackenzie Hancsicsak (ages 8–10), is Jack and Rebecca's daughter, and Randall and Kevin's sister. She is "Number Two" of the "Big Three", being the second and last of the surviving triplets to be born.

Kate is obese and has struggled with issues of self-esteem her entire life, which she greatly attributes to her strained relationship with her mother and the death of her father. Her relationship with her mother leads to depression, for which she later takes Prozac. She discontinues taking this drug due to the side effect of weight gain.

Kate lives in Los Angeles and is initially her brother Kevin's personal assistant. When Kevin decides to move to New York, he fires her in order to allow her to build her own life, apart from him. She is an ardent Pittsburgh Steelers fan and has a routine where she watches the games with her dad's ashes. At nine years old, she has her appendix removed on Christmas Eve.

Kate decides to join a weight-loss support group, where she meets Toby. Despite saying that she is not going to get involved with a fat person, she falls for Toby. When Toby decides to not continue with his diet, Kate breaks up with him and decides to go to Randall's for Thanksgiving. During a turbulent plane ride to New Jersey, Kate has an epiphany and decides to have gastric bypass surgery. After consulting with a doctor, she instead decides to enter a fat camp to attempt to lose the weight without surgery. When Toby surprises Kate by showing up at Randall's house for Christmas, he tells her that he can live without pizza and junk food, but that he cannot live without her. Toby collapses from cardiac arrhythmia, and is taken to the hospital.

After Toby's heart surgery, Kate and Toby decide to get engaged. Kate later finds out she is pregnant. Kate and Toby announce their pregnancy to Kevin, and plan to get married at city hall, but then consider a big wedding. But Kate loses the baby in a miscarriage. Despite some struggle in their relationship after the miscarriage, Toby eventually comes through for Kate. Kate struggles with eating junk food after the miscarriage, which Toby notices when a trash bag broke.

Kate had said that her father's death was her fault, and has a fear of caring for dogs. (Jack went back inside their burning house to save her dog, causing smoke inhalation which led to his death in the hospital. Afterwards, Kate wanted to give away the dog.) She blames herself even though Rebecca told Kate after Jack's funeral not to blame herself, because Jack made his own decisions. Every year on Super Bowl Sunday, Kate watches the videotape Jack made of her singing for a Berklee College of Music audition.

Kate and Toby marry at the end of season 2, although flashforwards throughout seasons 3 and 4 imply that Toby and Kate are no longer together by the time the Pearson children have grown up. After a period of singing Adele-o-grams, she makes the decision to return to college. Kate's pregnancy during the third season results in the premature birth (at 28 weeks) of their son. They name him Jack in honor of Kate's father. At the age of three months, baby Jack loses his sight. At the end of season 4, Kate and Toby decide to adopt a baby: in season 5 they are given a baby girl they name Hailey. When Toby is laid off later in the season, Kate gets a teaching job at the music school for the blind where she takes baby Jack. In season 6, Kate and Toby decide to divorce due to the distance their new jobs has put between them, fearing it has caused them to neglect toddler Jack: shortly after this, Kate enters into a relationship with Philip, her co-worker at the music school: flashforwards show that they will eventually marry.

- Isabella Rose Landau portrays Kate at age 4, beginning with the third season episode "The Pool: Part Two".

=== Randall Pearson ===
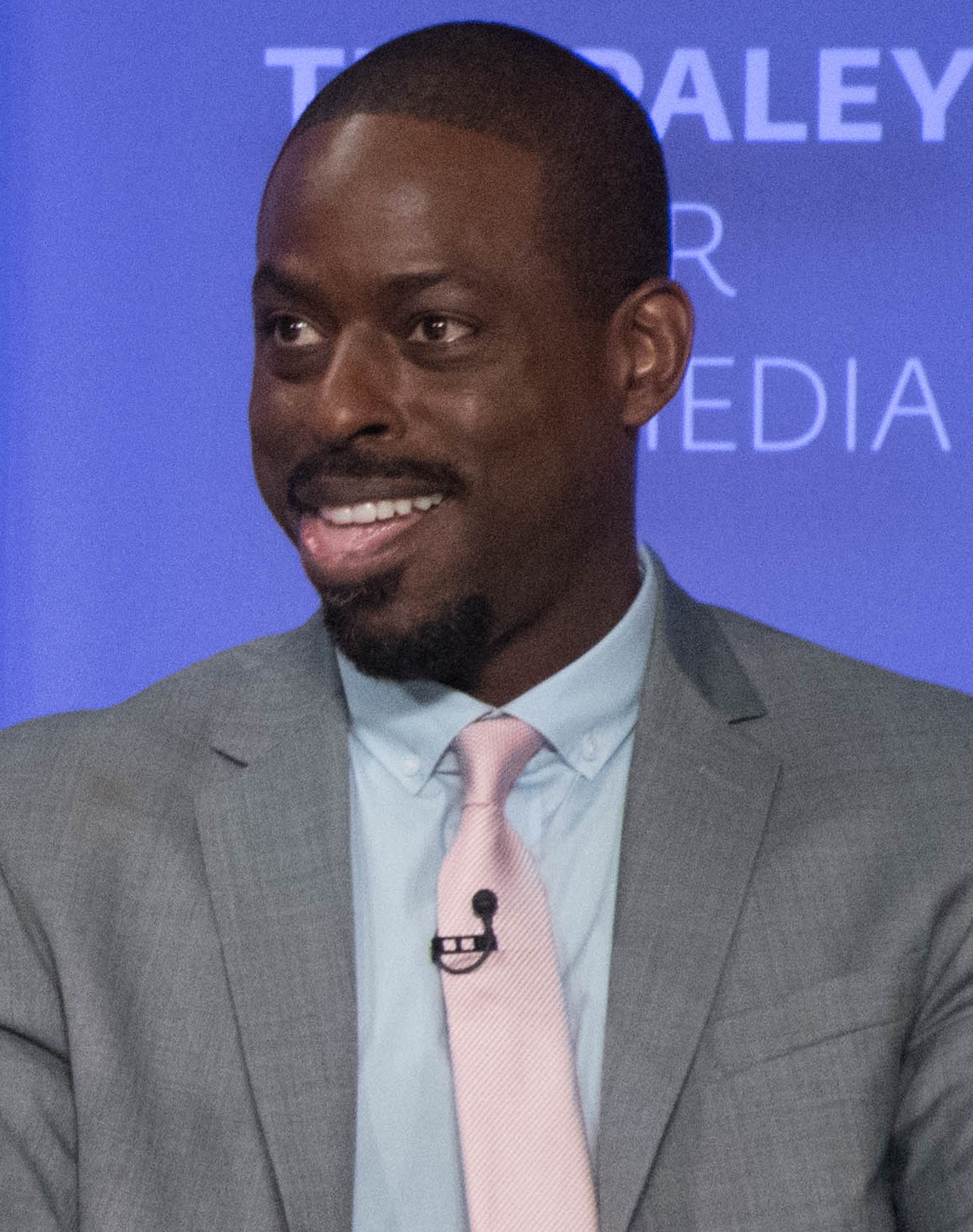
Sterling K. Brown in 2017

Randall Kenneth Pearson (born August 30, 1980), portrayed by Sterling K. Brown (current day), Niles Fitch (ages 15–17), and Lonnie Chavis (ages 8–10), is Jack and Rebecca's (adopted) son, and Kevin and Kate's brother. He is "Number Three" of the "Big Three", being adopted after Kevin and Kate were born. On his 36th birthday, he finds his biological father, William, and invites him to his northern New Jersey home.

Randall is an upper middle class politician and former businessman. He initially works at selling commodity futures based on weather patterns. However, after a nervous breakdown and some time off, he feels that his firm does not appreciate or respect him, and quits. Though both he and Beth are currently unemployed, he decides to run for political office in Philadelphia (despite living hours away in Alpine, New Jersey).

On the day that Randall is born, he is dropped off in front of a firehouse by his biological father, William, and then taken to the hospital, where he is adopted by Jack and Rebecca. Jack and Rebecca originally name him Kyle (the name they had intended for their third child, who was stillborn). Taking William's advice, Rebecca decides to give him his own name, naming him after William's favorite poet, Dudley Randall, although she refuses to let William see Randall. This allows them to honor both their stillborn son's memory and Randall, rather than essentially replacing one son with the other.

At age nine, Randall's teacher tells Jack and Rebecca that Randall is a gifted child who is not being challenged enough at his current school. They decide to remove him from public school and send him to Hanes Academy. In high school, Randall plays football and wears the number 36.

After Jack's death, Randall stepped up and took a "man of the house" role in his family. He learns he got accepted to Howard University, but after seeing Rebecca, Kevin, and Kate wallow in grief and despair over Jack's death, Randall chooses to reject his admission to Howard to stay close to his family and look after them. Randall ultimately goes to Carnegie Mellon University where he meets Beth, his future wife.

Randall and Kevin have an estranged relationship and do not reconnect until they are 36 years old. At some points in the past, Kevin is shown to openly despise Randall. At a high school football game, where they play on opposing teams, they get in a fight. However, there are also some moments when they act like brothers. When they are teenagers, Kevin is there with Kate to comfort Randall when a woman claims to be his birth mother as a scam to get money. When they are 36, they get in a fight on the street in New York, but Kevin tells onlookers they are brothers. When Randall has his nervous breakdown, Kevin leaves the theater on the opening night of his theatrical debut to comfort Randall.

As an adult, Kevin is hurt that Randall does not seem to care about his acting career. They begin to reconnect when Kevin needs Randall's advice, but Randall coldly tells him he should not care what he thinks. Eventually, Kevin moves to Randall's house in New Jersey, but they still have some work to do on building their relationship. He loves Thanksgiving and, alternately with Kevin, helps his family recreate a specific childhood Thanksgiving every year, including a 3.4 mile hike, watching Police Academy 3: Back in Training, and imitating a hotel owner known as "Pilgrim Rick".

In season 2, Randall wants to adopt a baby (to honor his father's legacy), but decides (with Beth's input) to foster an older child who may otherwise be overlooked by people who would prefer a baby. They foster a 12-year old girl named Deja, whose mother Shauna is incarcerated. She shows signs of physical abuse, but Randall and Beth start to win her trust and get her to open up. When the charges against Shauna are dropped, Deja goes back home with her (over Randall's initial objections). Randall and Beth plan to try fostering again after some time, although eventually Deja returns to their life and they end up formally adopting her.

Randall later buys the building William lived in, after reading a poem William composed looking at a Billie Holiday poster, becoming a landlord, and attempts to have the building repaired: in season 3, after trying to bond with some of the tenants who William was close to, Randall decides to run for city council, and wins, starting his tenure as a councilman in season 4. In season 5, Randall finds out his mother Laurel might be still alive. He goes to New Orleans where he finds out that Laurel died in 2015 from cancer and never searched for him because she was in prison after overdosing: William never knew Laurel was alive after he went to leave Randall at the fire station, and Laurel never knew about either William or Randall after she was released. Flashforwards in season 6 reveal that Randall's political career has taken off: he is a Senator by the time of Kate's second marriage, and at the end of the series he tells Kate and Kevin that he is weighing up the possibility of a presidential campaign.

- Lathan Moore portrays Randall at age 4 during the third season episode "The Graduates".

=== Beth Pearson ===
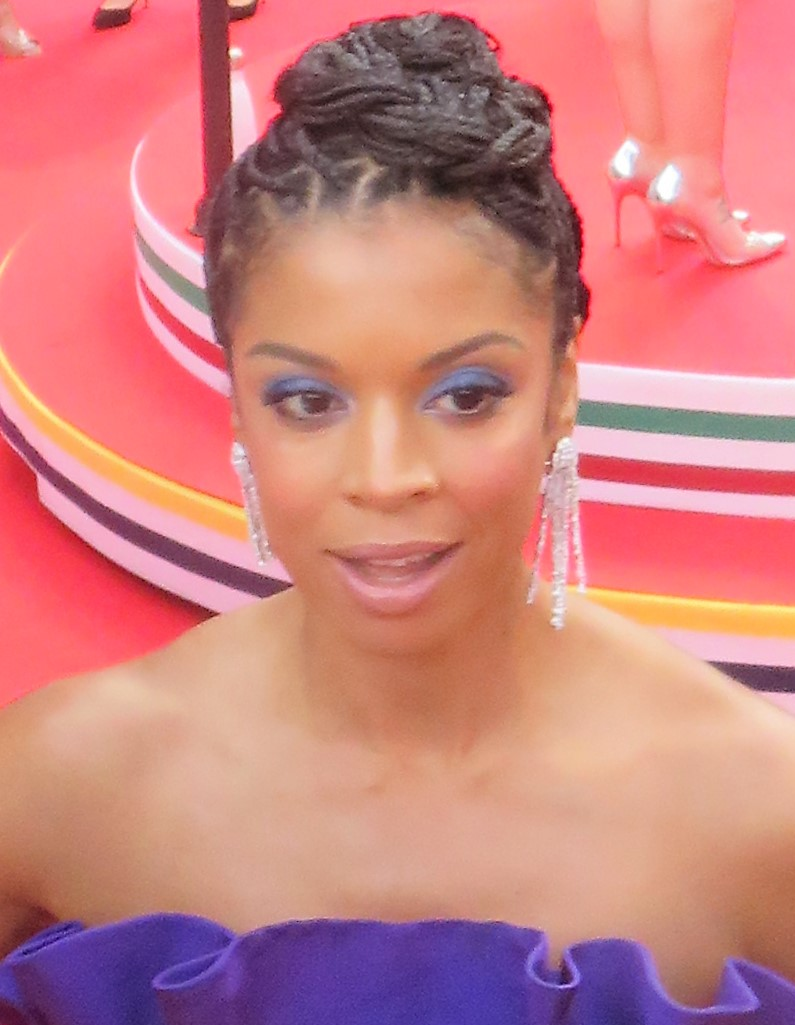
Susan Kelechi Watson in 2019

Bethany Pearson, née Clarke, portrayed by Susan Kelechi Watson, is Randall's wife, whom he met in college at Carnegie Mellon University and married 7 years later in 2005. The couple have three daughters, Tess, Annie, and Deja. Their marriage is based on honesty where they make an effort not to have secrets from one another. William reveals to Beth that he has met and communicated with Rebecca. This causes Beth to give Rebecca an ultimatum: to either tell Randall or she will. Growing up, Beth lived in a three-bedroom house with 14 other people. The household included her mother Carol, who taught at a local school, and father Abe, an immigrant from Jamaica who worked as a police officer, as well as siblings and Beth's cousin, Zoe Baker.

After Randall quits his job, Beth takes a job so Randall can be a stay-at-home dad. But after a while, Beth thinks Randall is in "outer space", and Beth thinks working again would be good for Randall. Beth is eventually laid off: Randall, by this time running for a Philadelphia city council seat, asks her to join his campaign.

Growing up, Beth was an aspiring dancer who Abe repeatedly recounted could "dance before she walked". After Abe died of lung cancer, Beth learns she did not get a solo she wanted, which prompted her mother to pull her from dance school and send her to college, where she met Randall. When in college, Bethany decides to use the shortened version of her name, Beth. Beth eventually becomes an instructor at a prestigious dance academy, and eventually sets up her own dance studio.

Beth is largely defined by her elegance, gracefulness, poise and refinement, qualities that she has had since she was a young ballet dancer and that she continued to refine and develop as she aged and rose up from her working class beginnings to her current upper middle class lifestyle. This is best demonstrated in the way she speaks; she mainly speaks in a soft and tender voice, even when overcome with great anger she still endeavors to maintain a gentle, composed, and eloquent tone. This is likely a personality trait she acquired from her mother. Another trait that demonstrates these qualities is in how she deals with challenges and adversities in her life with prominent examples being in season 3, when both her and Randall are going through marital difficulties, when she had to deal with the grief of losing her father, or when she had lost her job of 12 years amongst many other examples; Beth chooses to never completely falter but rather confront her life's difficulties with dignity and grace and endeavors to maintain a calm and collected composure for as long as she possibly can. Even when confronted with her own negative emotions or consoling others in their times of sorrow, Beth always tries to maintain her elegance, the best example of this being during a dance recital when one of her students fell down, she walked across the stage, sat down in an elegant manner beside her student and gently encourages her to get up and dance.

- Beth's childhood and teen years are included in flashbacks in the third season episode "Our Little Island Girl", with Rachel Hilson portraying Beth as a teenager, and Akira Akbar portraying Beth in childhood.

=== Toby Damon ===
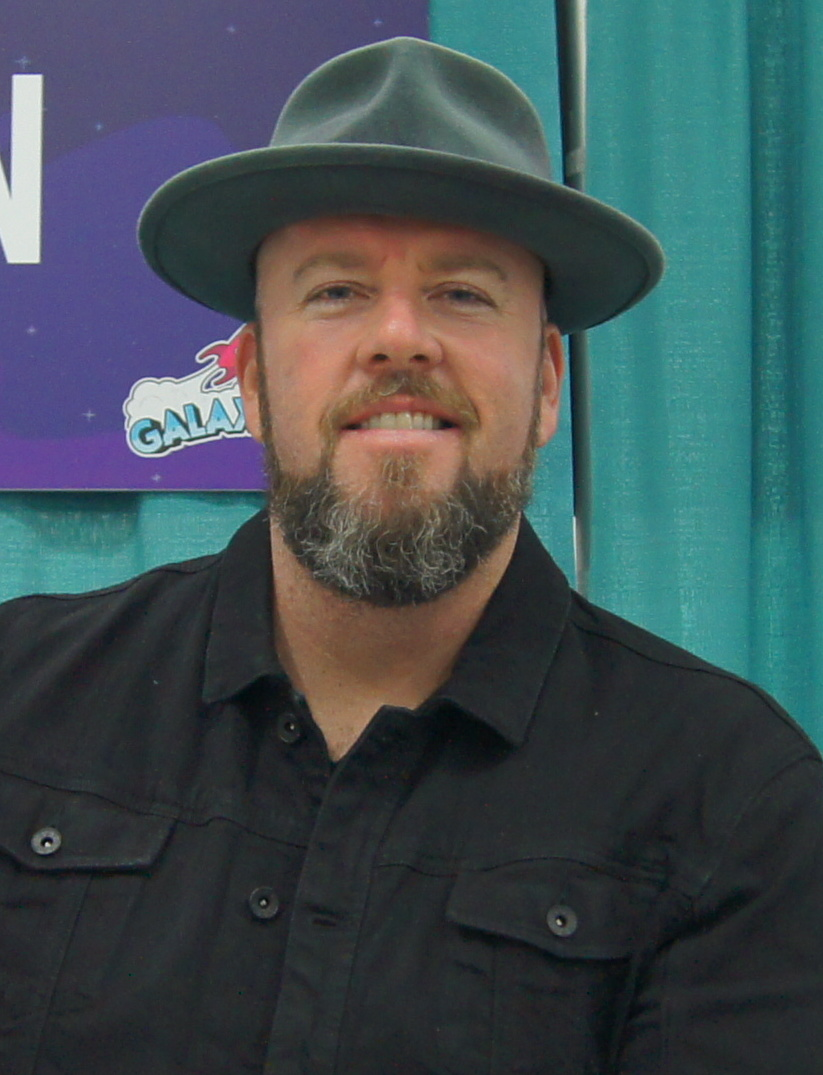
Chris Sullivan in 2019

Tobias Damon, portrayed by Chris Sullivan, is Kate's first husband. Toby was born in Palm Springs, California. Toby begins dating Kate after they meet at a weight-loss support group. Toby is confident with his own body although obese, and encourages Kate to have better self-esteem. He was previously married to a woman whom Kate views as beautiful and successful, but who treated him badly. Toby gained 90 pounds in the first year after his divorce.

Refusing to take Kate's hesitance about the relationship lightly, Toby continually comes up with sweet gestures to win her over. In the beginning, he feels that he has to compete with Kevin for Kate's attention. Despite breaking his weight-loss goals, Toby decides dieting is not for him and goes off his diet, resulting in Kate breaking up with him. He surprises Kate by showing up at Randall's house for Christmas Eve, stating that he can live without pizza and junk food, but that he can not live without her. On Christmas Eve, Toby collapses and ends up in the hospital with an arrhythmia.

After Toby's heart surgery, he and Kate decide to get engaged. Kate becomes pregnant with Toby's child, but she miscarries; afterwards, despite an initial struggle in their relationship, Toby comes through for her. Kate, around the 20th anniversary of Jack's death, tells Toby he strengthens her and Jack would have loved him.

In Season 3, shortly after Toby and Kate marry, it is revealed that Toby suffers from severe and crippling depression, which he takes medication to control: he briefly stops while he and Kate are trying to conceive again and suffers immobilizing relapses as a result. Eventually, Kate gets pregnant and gives birth to their son prematurely (at 28 weeks), whom they agree to name Jack in honor of her father. In season 5, he and Kate decided to adopt another baby. Shortly after they adopt their daughter, Toby is laid off, and spends the rest of the season in a depressive mood until he is given a job offer with an internet startup in San Francisco: flashforwards throughout seasons 3 through 5 imply that Kate and Toby are no longer together by the time all the Pearson children have grown up, and season 6 reveals that Toby and Kate divorce due to the distance their jobs has put between them and the way it has caused them to neglect their children.

- Toby's childhood and teen years are included in flashbacks in the third season episode "Toby", with Luke Clark portraying Toby as a teenager, and Dylan Gage portraying Toby in childhood.

=== William Hill ===
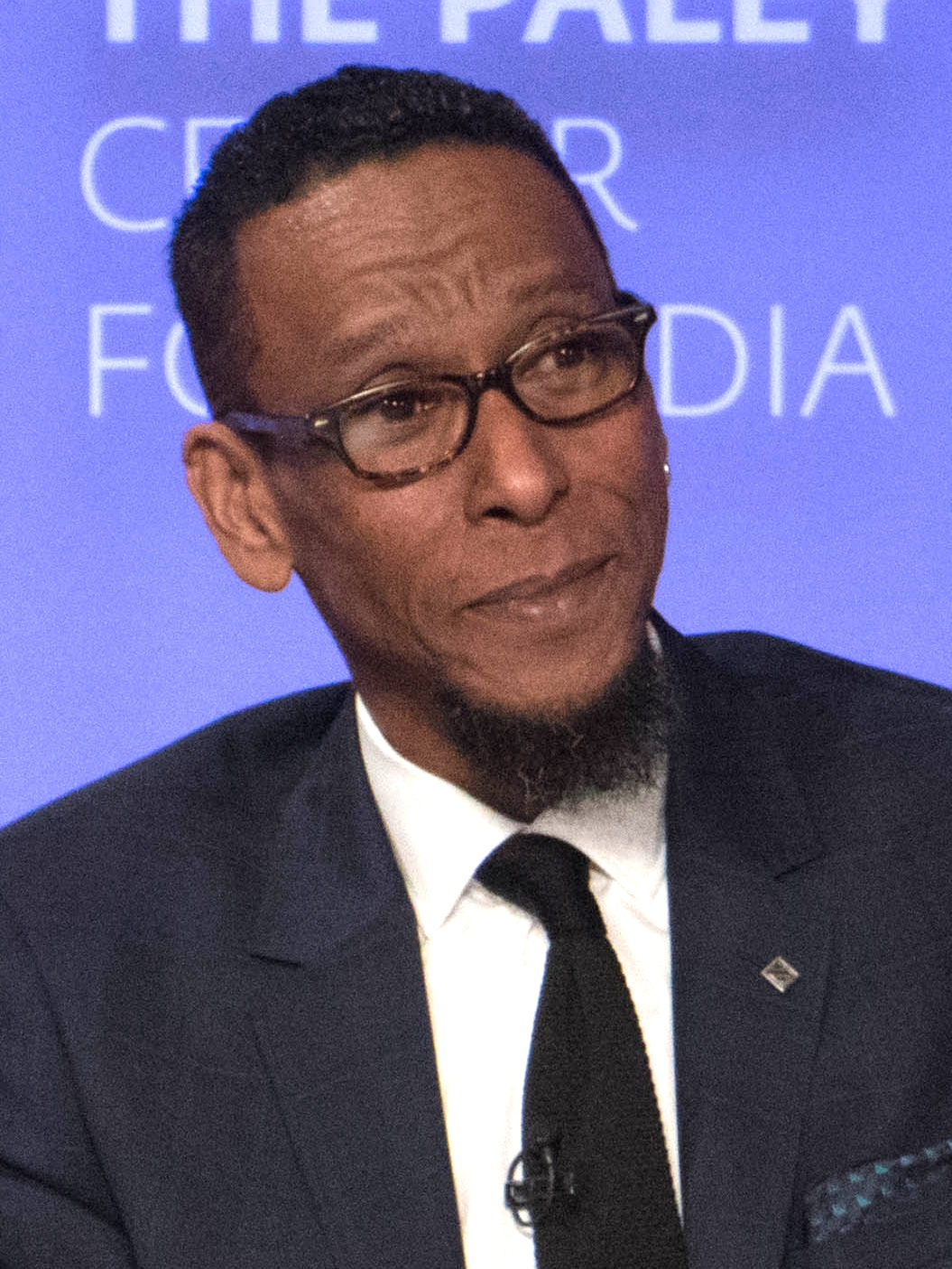
Ron Cephas Jones

William H. "Shakespeare" Hill (died 2017), portrayed by Ron Cephas Jones (recent days) and Jermel Nakia (as a young adult), is Randall's biological father.

William is a recovering drug addict who is suffering from terminal stage-four stomach cancer in the present. He grew up in Memphis, and after his mother moved to Pittsburgh he stayed in Memphis to play in his cousin Ricky's band, where he played piano, wrote, and sang. William left the band, with the intention of returning, to care for his dying mother. However, after meeting Randall's mother and becoming a drug addict, he never returned. He got clean after he thought he saw a monkey on the streets, realizing that nothing good comes from a person being on the street at 3:30 am. (He also stayed clean for years after being told by a judge, who offered to help him after his first conviction, to picture the judge's face when he was tempted to do the wrong thing.) William returns to Philadelphia to attend a Narcotics Anonymous meeting, hoping to find and reconnect with his former lover—a man named Jessie.

William, who is bisexual, and Jessie never officially break up. Jessie assumes William had died when he vanishes one night—the night William moves in with Randall's family.

After leaving Randall at the firehouse, he waits outside the hospital to see him being taken home by Jack and Rebecca. Rebecca realizes that William is Randall's father, after seeing him getting onto the bus as she leaves the hospital. She eventually tracks him down, a secret she keeps from everyone, including Randall and Jack.

William always wanted to have a relationship with his child, but promises Rebecca he will stay away for Randall's benefit. He accidentally reveals this secret to Beth one night when they get high together, and Randall accidentally finds out himself, when he finds a letter and photo in William's apartment, from Rebecca, while looking for cassette tapes. (William also tells Randall about the second time William saw Rebecca; he took a cab to follow her home, hoping he could be in Randall's life, but when he was outside the house, he thought better of it.)

William eventually succumbs to his cancer during a road trip back to Memphis with Randall. Prior to his death he leaves a letter to Randall's girls, asking them to plan a fun memorial for him. He also sends Beth a postcard from Memphis, saying goodbye and calling her the daughter he never had.

=== Miguel Rivas ===
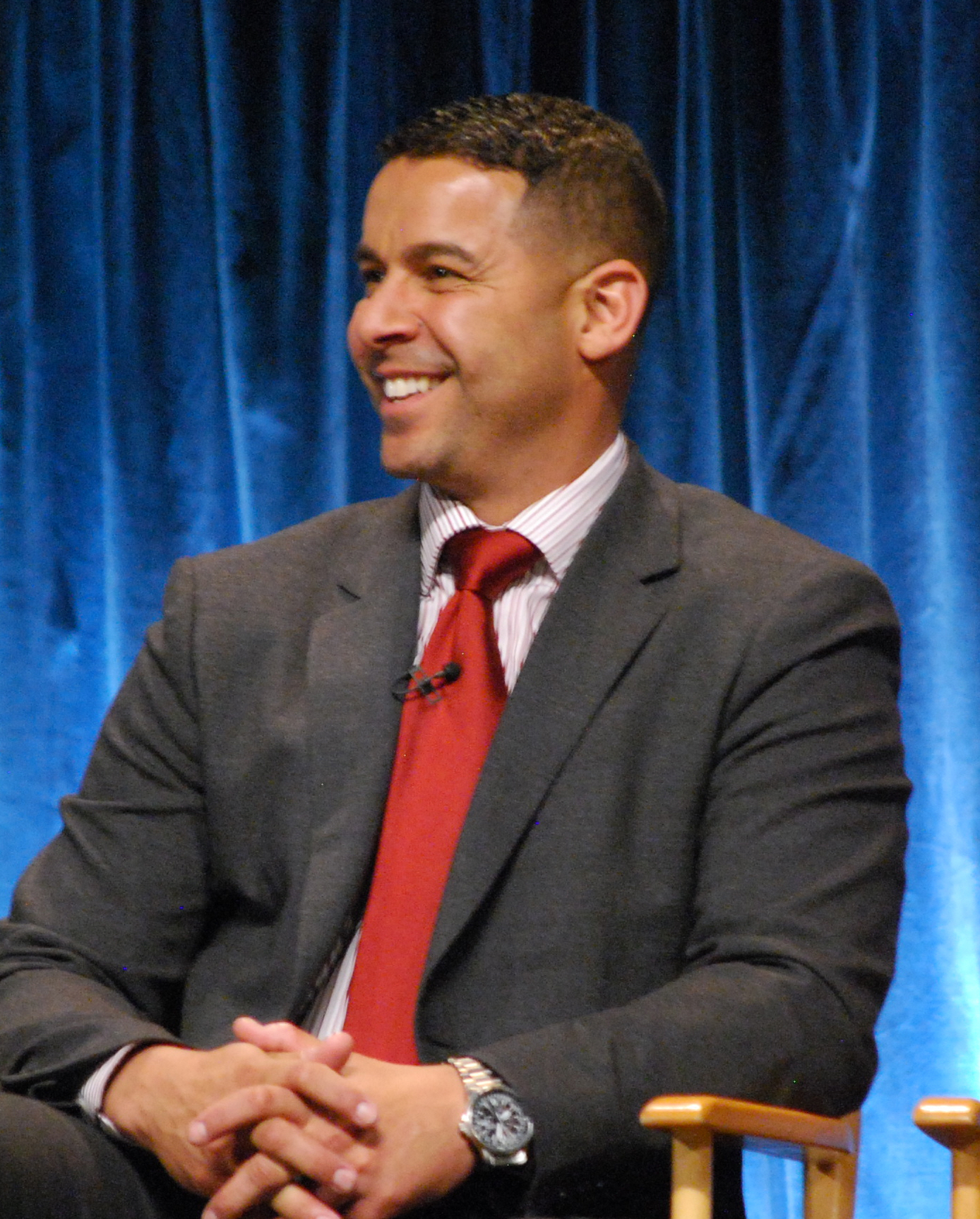
Jon Huertas in 2012

Miguel Rivas, portrayed by Jon Huertas, was Jack's best friend and is Rebecca's second husband. Miguel was originally married to Shelly, before they divorced: in the years since then, Miguel's relationship with his own children has critically deteriorated. While it originally seems that his marriage to Rebecca happened shortly after Jack's death, in season 2 it is clarified that the two did not get together until at least ten years after Jack's death. Miguel is initially disliked by Kevin. Their relationship improves slightly when Miguel tells Kevin how much he is like Jack.

Miguel tells Beth and Toby one day, when Kevin is in rehab meeting with "immediate family", that he feels like a real outsider compared to them and the Pearson family. When Kevin gets out of rehab and stays with Rebecca, Miguel is protective of her after she is hurt by Kevin's arrest, and by Kevin criticizing her in his rehab session with the family. Kevin's relationship with Miguel improves significantly after he asks if Miguel was in love with Rebecca when Jack was alive and Miguel replies that while he does care for Rebecca in the present day, the idea never occurred to him at the time because everyone saw Jack and Rebecca as one entity rather than two separate individuals. Miguel eventually bonds with Beth and Toby as "The Other Big Three", remaining the only one of the three to have actually known Jack and so effectively acting as arbiter between the family and spousal circles.

=== Sophie Inman ===
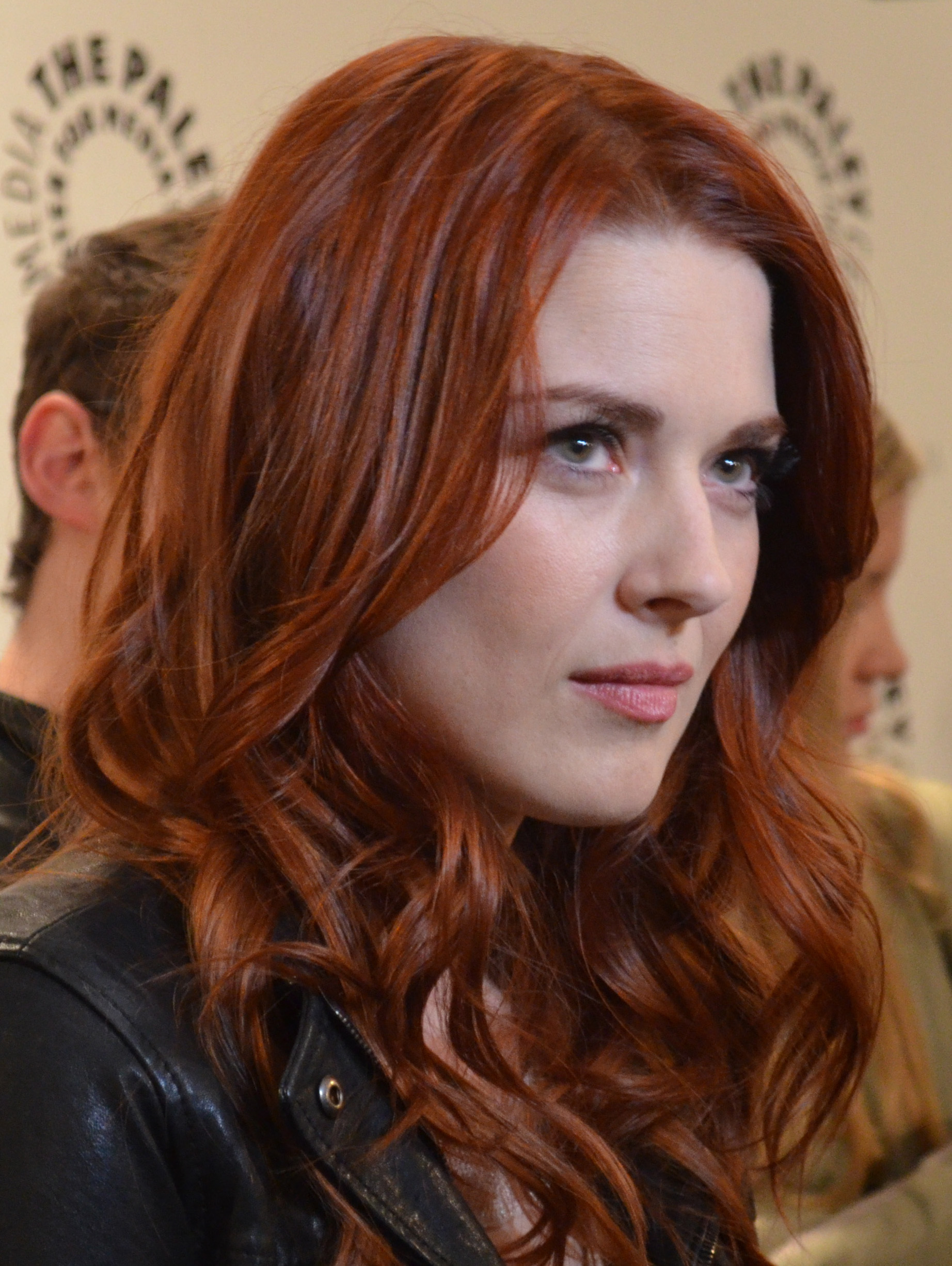
Alexandra Breckenridge

Sophie Inman, portrayed by Alexandra Breckenridge (modern day), Amanda Leighton (ages 15–18), and Sophia Coto (age 10), is Kate's childhood best friend and Kevin's childhood love and his wife. Kevin and Sophie eloped very soon after Jack's death. After their marriage, Kevin sought Sophie's grandmother's ring from her mother, Claire, but Claire told him that his marriage was too new and he still needed to earn the ring. Eventually, Kevin and Sophie's marriage fractures when they have to go long-distance, with Sophie in college and Kevin pursuing acting. He ultimately cheats on her. When he tells her at Thanksgiving, she leaves him; she also ends her friendship with Kate after learning that Kate knew about Kevin's cheating but didn't tell her.

Kevin moves to New York and reconciles with her, after his relationships with Olivia and Sloane end. Their relationship initially survives the distance when Kevin is in his movie in L.A., but Kevin breaks up with Sophie as he sinks into drug addiction, admitting that he cannot be the man that he wants to be for her. When Kevin gets sober, he tries making amends to Sophie; she just wants to remember Kevin when they were younger.

Kevin later visits Sophie in Season 3, after learning his girlfriend Zoe never wants to have kids. Sophie reveals that she is now engaged to Grant, tells Kevin that his charm has spared him difficult decisions, and tells him to "Decide what you want, you always get it." As a thank you, Kevin sends Billy Joel tickets to Sophie and Grant. In Season 4, Sophie calls Kevin to tell him that her mother, Claire, has died. Kevin attends the funeral and steals away Sophie for a bit, where the two reconnect briefly, but Sophie ultimately returns to the funeral and Grant. At Claire's grave, Kevin laments that he never earned Sophie's grandmother's ring, and wishes he had "another crack at it." When Kevin returns to LA, he sleeps with Madison, who becomes pregnant with twins, Nicky and Franny.

In Season 5, Sophie sees the news of Kevin's engagement to Madison, and she seems somewhat saddened by the news. She later calls Kevin during his bachelor party, having changed her phone number (later revealed in Season 6 to be due to her work as a travelling nurse after Claire's death). Briefly reconnecting with Sophie gives Kevin pause towards his marriage to Madison, but he ultimately deletes Sophie's number and decides to go through with it. However, because Kevin cannot tell Madison he loves her, Madison later calls off the wedding.

In Season 6, Kate reaches out to Sophie after being caught in the middle of a conflict between Kevin and Madison, apologizing for not telling her about Kevin's cheating. Sophie forgives her, and between 2021 and 2026, Kate and Sophie rebuild their friendship, with Sophie ultimately being invited to Kate and Phillip's engagement party and wedding. She attends the engagement party with Grant (who she is now married to), where Grant and Kevin meet. On the night before Kate's wedding, Sophie and Kevin spend time together reconnecting, and Sophie ultimately reveals to Kevin that she is divorced. The two return to Kevin's room and begin making out, but Sophie worries that they are regressing into their past selves and leaves. The next day, after the wedding, Rebecca (who, because of her dementia, believes that Kevin and Sophie are still in their 20's and married), assures Sophie that Kevin will mature into a better partner. She tells Kevin that she wants to give their relationship another try with all of the growth the two have gone through, and the two kiss, to the family's applause. She and Kevin remarry at some point before Miguel's death, and she moves to LA to be with Kevin and his kids. After Miguel's death, she and Kevin agree to move into the house he built for Rebecca to care for her.

=== Nicky Pearson ===
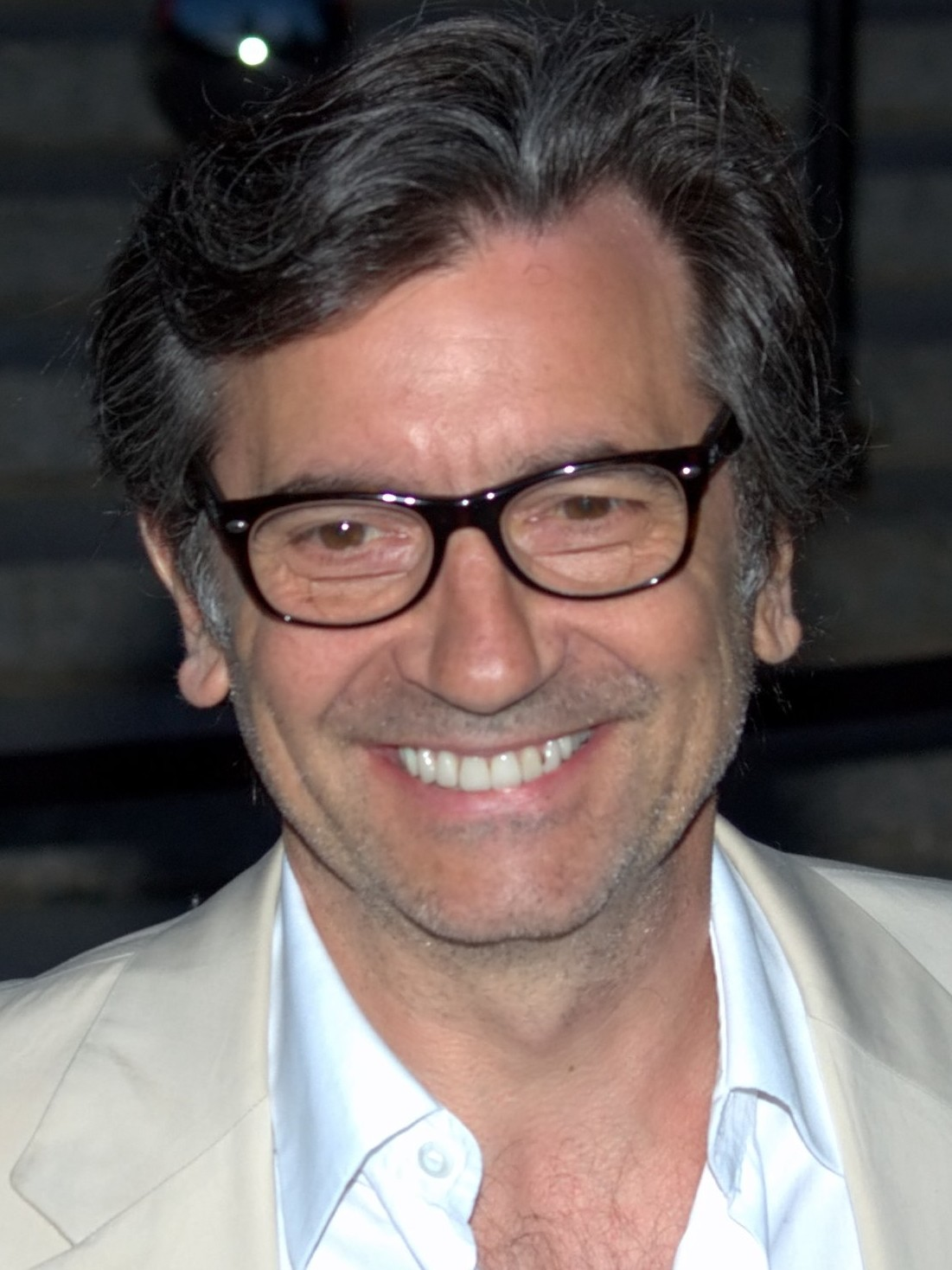
Griffin Dunne in 2010

Nicholas "Nicky" Pearson (born October 18, 1948), portrayed by Griffin Dunne (present day) and Michael Angarano (age 21–44), is Jack Pearson's younger brother, who as a young adult served in the Vietnam War alongside his brother. Jack told his family that Nicky died in the war: in reality, they became estranged after Nicky accidentally killed a Vietnamese child while fishing with hand grenades. Nicky then moved into a trailer in Bradford, Pennsylvania, and continued to send postcards to Jack. In 1992, Jack visited Nicky to tell him to stop, refusing to hear what Nicky had to say about the war incident. Jack then showed his brother a picture of his family, and left, after which Nicky never saw Jack again.

Kevin, Kate and Randall tracked him down in 2019, and decided to give him the chance Jack did not give him. Nicky lamented to them that he never got to tell Jack that the child's death was an accident. Kevin later took it upon himself to help Nicky out, and the two eventually bonded together during their shared alcoholism rehab enough for Nicky to join the Pearson family Thanksgiving. Kevin and Nicky remain close, as Nicky is present during flashforwards in the series and Kevin eventually named his own newborn son after Nicky.

In Season 6, he tracks down Sally who is now married, but is able to move on from her. He then meets flight attendant Edie and marries her at some point before Kate's wedding to Philip.

- Nicky as a child appears beginning in the second season, as portrayed by Donnie Masihi.

=== Tess Pearson ===
Tessa Marie "Tess" Pearson, (born October 31, 2008), portrayed by Eris Baker, is Randall and Beth's older daughter. She was promoted to series regular in season two. She is named after the Tessana ceiling fan Randall was going to purchase when hearing about Beth going into labor. Although not noticed acting out previously, she hides in her uncle Kevin's car (claiming she hates it at her house), when he is pulled over for speeding and charged with DUI; she later claims she was just unhappy that Deja, the foster child, had to go home. Tess admits one day (on the 20th anniversary of Jack's death) she has tried to prevent social workers from calling, worried that recent changes mean Randall wanted a "new life"; Randall reassures her that he will always be devoted to her. After having her first period, Tess slowly came out as LGBT to her parents and entire family. Tess is shown in the future as an adult (portrayed by Iantha Richardson), working as a social worker, with an older Randall meeting her for dinner like they have done while Tess was younger.

=== Annie Pearson ===
Annie Regina Pearson, portrayed by Faithe Herman, is Randall and Beth's younger daughter. She was also promoted to series regular in season two. On William's first night at Randall's family's house, when William wants to step out, Annie convinces William that he might be happy if he stayed. It is implied that she at one time loves telling knock knock jokes and sometimes uses them to deflate rising tensions in family situations.

=== Zoe Baker ===
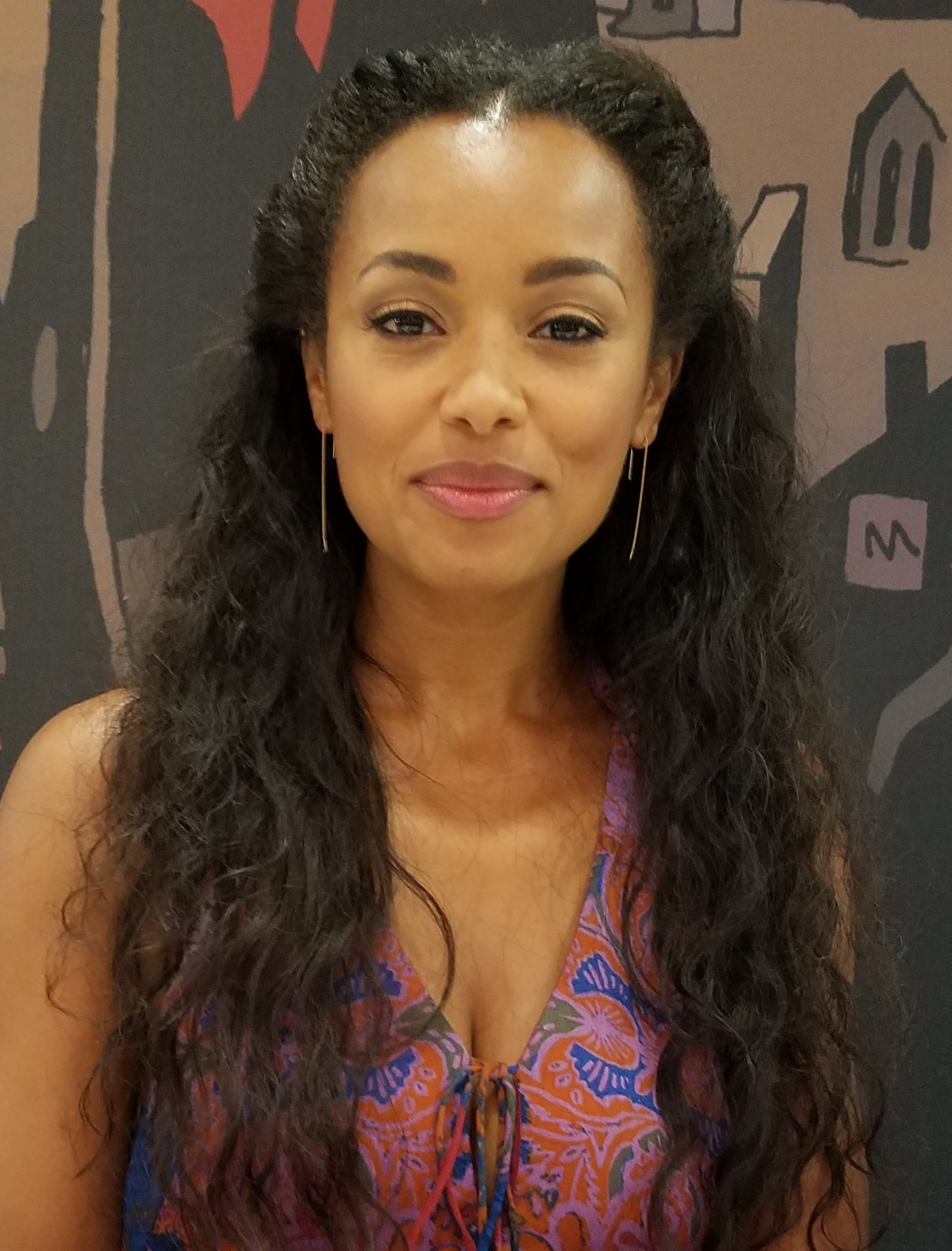
Melanie Liburd in 2016

Zoe Baker, portrayed by Melanie Liburd, is Beth's cousin, a photographer and documentary filmmaker who becomes Kevin's new love interest. She was promoted to series regular in season three. Beth believes Zoe to be a "maneater" who goes through men routinely, and warns Kevin to stay away from her: however, Zoe gets enamoured with Kevin after hearing his wedding toast to Kate and Toby and they begin dating. She assists Kevin on his quest to learn about Jack's time in the Vietnam War, helping him track down Jack's former squadmates and even flying to Vietnam with him, and they start to fall in love. Zoe eventually reveals to Kevin her history of sexual abuse from her father, and explains her perceived "man-eating" behaviour stems from an inability to commit to a relationship out of issues regarding personal space, but admits that being with Kevin is good for her, and the two reaffirm their love and move in together. They eventually break up after Kevin's desire to be a parent clashes with Zoe's desire for independence: although Kevin wants a life with Zoe, even without children, Zoe ends their relationship after she realizes Kevin's affinity for fatherhood upon seeing him comfort and assuage a confused Tess.

- Zoe's childhood and teen years are included in flashbacks in the third season episode "Our Little Island Girl", with Brianna Reed portraying Zoe as a teenager, and Dakota Baccelli portraying Zoe in childhood.

=== Deja Pearson ===
Deja Pearson, portrayed by Lyric Ross, is a foster child and later Randall and Beth's adopted daughter. She was also promoted to series regular in season three. She became their foster child while her mother Shauna was incarcerated. Deja is eventually formally adopted by the Pearsons when Shauna starts to consider herself irresponsible and unfit: she struggles with resentment against them, but eventually comes around. She soon displays a propensity for intelligence similar to Randall's, and effectively acts as his voice of conscience.

After the family moves, Deja meets Malik, a teenage father, and the two start to fall in love, remaining a couple for several seasons. When Malik gets into Harvard, Deja takes an overnight trip to visit him, lying to her parents about her whereabouts, and the two become more intimate. They eventually come up with a plan to be together, but Randall intervenes and talks to Malik about doing what's best for Deja, reminding him that if it's true love they'll find their way back to each other later (when they're older and the time is right) so Malik subsequently breaks up with her; flashforwards near the end of the series reveal that Malik and Deja eventually get back together as adults and medical students, with Deja pregnant with their first child, a boy they decide to name William.

- Deja's childhood is included in flashbacks in the second season episode "This Big, Amazing, Beautiful Life" and the third season episode "Nine Bucks", with Makenzie Lee-Foster portraying Deja at ages 5 and 6.

=== Malik Hodges ===
Malik Hodges, portrayed by Asante Blackk, is a teenage father living with his parents in Philadelphia. He meets Deja at an End-of-Summer Barbecue and the two begin to develop feelings for each other.

=== Madison Simons ===
Madison Simons, portrayed by Caitlin Thompson, is a member of Toby and Kate's support group. Kate at first had little patience for Madison, who did not appear to have the issues the rest of the group has. In a season two episode, after Kate criticized Madison in group, she accidentally bumped into Madison's vehicle; Kate ended up telling her she was pregnant, so Madison was the first to hear about Kate's pregnancy. Kate later befriended Madison, and discovered Madison was bulimic: by season 5, it is revealed that Madison's bulimia is linked to her lifelong depression with coming from a broken and abusive home and her poor social life.

Madison remained an integral part of Kate's friend circle, even though the rest of the Pearsons (and their spouses) found her mildly annoying and abrasive. Eventually, Kevin and Madison had a one-night stand that resulted in the conception of twins, and Kevin committed to being there for Madison and the babies: they become a couple and get engaged in season 5, but Madison later breaks up with Kevin on their wedding day, convinced that Kevin is not truly in love with her and that she deserves better, and grateful that the love and support Kevin has given her throughout her pregnancy and their engagement has allowed her to finally move on.

In Season 6, she begins a relationship with Elijah, and the two ultimately get married and have another child together. After Miguel's death, she and Elijah agree to move to the East Coast to be closer to his family, so that Kevin and Sophie can also move to help care for Rebecca.

=== Philip ===
Philip, portrayed by Chris Geere, is Kate's new boss at the school for blind children. In a flashforward, he's revealed to be Kate's second husband.

== Recurring characters ==
=== Introduced in season one ===
- Gerald McRaney as Dr. Nathan Katowski (aka "Dr. K"): The obstetrician who delivered Kate and Kevin. Dr. K was married to his wife, Caroline, for 53 years before she died in 1979. He and Caroline had five children, the first of which was stillborn. Dr. K became a last-minute substitute for Rebecca's regular doctor, whose appendix burst. After one of the triplets is stillborn, he gave Jack some fatherly advice, and unknowingly convinced Jack to adopt Randall. Dr. K eventually dated and married Anne. They attended Jack's funeral, and Dr. K gave Rebecca some encouragement afterwards.
- Janet Montgomery as Olivia Maine: a theatre actress, Kevin's former stage partner and ex-girlfriend. Olivia is originally from England, and the daughter of an American mother. She is very cynical and does not commit to relationships. She attended Thanksgiving at Randall's house and began dating Kevin. After breaking up with Kevin, Olivia vanished and stopped showing up for the show rehearsals. After her return, she found that Kevin was dating Sloane.
- Milana Vayntrub as Sloane Sandburg: Kevin's stage partner and ex-girlfriend. Sloane was the writer of Kevin's play, and she began dating him after his breakup with Olivia. She brought Kevin to her family's Hanukkah dinner and went with him to Randall's house for Christmas Eve. Kevin convinced her to take over the starring role of the play after Olivia vanished. After Olivia suddenly returned, Sloane overheard Kevin telling Olivia that he could not take her back and that he was staying with Sloane, because it is the "right thing" to do. She broke up with Kevin, but continued to work on the play with him as friends.
- Ryan Michelle Bathe as Yvette: A family friend of the Pearsons. Yvette became friends with the Pearsons, after meeting them at the local pool. She became their initial connection with Black life and culture for Randall's sake.
- Denis O'Hare as Jessie: William's friend and former lover.
- Adam Bartley as Duke: The stable worker at the weight-loss camp Kate attended. Duke works at a horse stable of the weight-loss camp his family owns. He continuously was rude to and hitting on Kate, inviting her to his cabin, despite her being engaged. Although he constantly criticized the whole weight-loss concept, when Kate went to his cabin and criticized him, he said his parents run the camp, and terminated her stay.
- Jill Johnson as Laurie: A member of Toby and Kate's weight-loss support group.
- Peter Onorati as Stanley Pearson: Jack's father. Jack had a strained relationship with Stanley, who was alcoholic and abusive. When Stanley was dying, Jack did not want to see him.
- Hari Dhillon as Sanjay Jahiri: Randall's newer former coworker. Sanjay was given much of Randall's work before Randall had his nervous breakdown.
- Jennifer C. Holmes as Laurel Dubois: Randall's biological mother, seen as a young adult through flashbacks.
  - The fifth season episode "Birth Mother" further explores Laurel's upbringing and later life, with Calah Lane portraying a younger Laurel, and Angela Gibbs as Laurel in later years.

=== Introduced in season two ===
- Joy Brunson as Shauna: Deja's biological mother.
- Isabel Oliver Marcus as Allison Walsh: Randall's girlfriend during his teen years, whose father didn’t like Randall because he is black.
- Elizabeth Perkins as Janet Malone: Rebecca's overbearing mother.

=== Introduced in season three ===
- Phylicia Rashad as Carol Clarke: Beth's mother, a critical and overbearing high school principal.
- Tim Jo as Jae-Won Yoo: Randall's campaign manager and city council chief of staff.

=== Introduced in season four ===
- Jennifer Morrison as Cassidy Sharp: A veteran of the US Marines. She struggled after coming home from her tour in the Middle East. She developed a drinking problem. Combined with trouble finding work, she accidentally struck her son which results in a separation from her husband. Her group therapy session is interrupted by a drunk Nicky Pearson throwing a chair through a window. She ends up befriending Nicky's nephew, Kevin, and they bond through AA: they have a one-night stand before Kevin convinces her to repair her marriage, and she remains Kevin's confidante long after, eventually becoming a worker and partner in Big Three Homes, a construction company Kevin builds in memory of Jack and Rebecca.
- Blake Stadnik as Jack Damon (born March 10, 2019): The son of Kate and Toby. Due to his premature birth, he is legally blind and can only see limited light and vague shapes. In the 2040s, after Jack's dog accidentally breaks his breakfast plate, Jack goes to a diner where he meets a waitress named Lucy. The two enter into a relationship and eventually marry. Following in his mother and grandmother's footsteps as a musician, Jack gains popularity as an artist and is seen performing a sold-out show. In the fourth season finale, Lucy gives birth to their daughter, Hope Damon.
  - The fourth season episode "Clouds" briefly shows Jack while growing up learning music, portrayed at age 4 by Sebastian Forbes, and as a teenager by Tanner Long.

=== Introduced in season five ===
- Vien Hong as Hai Lang (Young Hai portrayed by Kane Lieu): A Vietnamese American refugee who settled in New Orleans since the 1970s after the Vietnam War. After Randall's video goes viral online, Hai connects the dots and reaches out to Randall to reveal he knew Randall's birth mother. Hai is the former lover of Laurel, Randall's birth mother. The relationship between Hai and Laurel didn't work out as Laurel wanted to leave New Orleans and Hai was obligated to taking care of his parents.

Over the years, Hai married and had children. When Laurel returned, they acknowledged each other, but kept their distance due to Hai having settled down with a new family. Despite that, they were satisfied with the comfort of each other's present having worked across from each other at the street markets. Decades later when Hai's wife passes away and his kids have moved out of New Orleans, Hai and Laurel rekindle their romance before Laurel passes away from cancer. Hai considers Laurel the love of his life.

=== Introduced in season six ===
- Vanessa Bell Calloway as Edie: A flight attendant who accosts Nicky on a flight to Pennsylvania, revealed in flashforwards to eventually be his wife.
- Mike Manning as the star of the reboot of The Manny
- Adam Korson as Elijah: A man Madison met during her book club, whom she eventually marries and has a son with.

== Guest stars ==
The following is a supplementary list of guest stars, some recurring, who appear in lesser roles. The characters are listed, in alphabetical order by actor, by the season in which they first appeared.

=== Introduced in season one ===
- Susan Blakely as Anne: a friend of the Pearsons who dates and marries Dr. K.
- Katie Couric as herself: Kevin had a recurring dream about an interview by Katie Couric going badly.
- Wynn Everett as Shelly: Shelly was Miguel's first wife until their divorce.
- Brad Garrett as Wes Manning: Wes was the television network president tasked with negotiating Kevin's exit from The Manny.
- Jami Gertz as Marin Rosenthal: Marin hired Kate to be an event coordinator.
- Ron Howard as himself: After Howard saw Kevin's play, he called Kevin to praise his performance and offered to send him a script for a new movie he was producing.
- Mario Lopez as himself: Lopez was hosting a talk show discussing Kevin's on-set meltdown.
- Seth Meyers as himself: Meyers saw Kevin and Randall fighting on a New York City sidewalk and approached the pair, recognizing Kevin as a showbiz colleague.
- Katey Sagal as Lanie Schulz: Kevin's Hollywood agent.
- Jimmi Simpson as Andy Fannan: Andy was a co-worker whom Randall talked out of committing suicide on Christmas Eve.
- Alan Thicke as himself: Thicke was guest-starring on The Manny when Kevin had his on-set meltdown.

=== Introduced in season two ===
- Kate Burton as Barbara: Psychologist at Kevin's rehab who facilitates his meeting with the family.
- Garrett Morris as Lloyd: A resident living in William's old apartment building.
- Debra Jo Rupp as Linda: A social worker who worked with Randall and Beth Pearson when they fostered Deja.
- Sylvester Stallone as himself: Actor in a movie Kevin was cast in.
- Brian Grazer as himself: The producer of Kevin's movie.

=== Introduced in season three ===
- Charlie Robinson as Donald Robinson: A retired Vietnam veteran who served with Jack, who Kevin visits looking for answers about Jack's time in the war.
  - Mo McRae portrays Donald Robinson in flashbacks set during the war.
- Carl Lumbly as Abe Clarke: Beth's father, a Jamaican immigrant.

=== Introduced in season four ===
- Omar Epps as Darnell Hodges: Malik's father.
- Marsha Stephanie Blake as Kelly Hodges: Malik's mother and Darnell's wife.
- Nick Wechsler as Ryan Sharp: Cassidy's ex-husband and father of their son Matty.
- Auden Thornton as Lucy: Jack Damon's fiancée and mother of their daughter, Hope.
- Tim Matheson as Dave Malone: Rebecca's loving but overprotective father. He is disapproving of Jack upon their first meeting.
- M. Night Shyamalan as himself: The director of a movie in which Kevin has a role.
- Timothy Omundson as Gregory: Kate and Toby's new next door neighbor.
- Sophia Bush as Lizzy: A woman who Kevin spends a romantic day with. It turns out she is married and Kevin is her celebrity "hall pass".
- Adelaide Kane as Hailey Damon: Kate and Toby's adopted daughter and Jack Damon's younger sister.
- John Legend as himself: A musician that Kevin calls in for a favor to impress a girl he just met.
- Pamela Adlon as Dr. Leigh: Randall's therapist.
- Merrick McCartha as Lester: one of the councilmen Randall golfs and has lunch with.

=== Introduced in season six ===
- Andrew Santino as Casey
- Katie Lowes as Arielle: The wedding singer at Kate and Philip's wedding.
- Tyler Barnhardt as Mike: A lifeguard at the swimming pool the Pearsons go swimming at.
