= Possibility =

Possibility is the quality of being possible and may refer to:

- Probability, the measure of the likelihood that an event will occur
- Epistemic possibility, a topic in philosophy and modal logic
- Possibility theory, a mathematical theory for dealing with certain types of uncertainty and is an alternative to probability theory
- Subjunctive possibility, (also called alethic possibility) is a form of modality studied in modal logic.
  - Logical possibility, a proposition that will depend on the system of logic being considered, rather than on the violation of any single rule
- Possible world, a complete and consistent way the world is or could have been

== Other ==
- Possible (Italy), a political party in Italy
- Possible Peru, a political party in Peru
- Possible Peru Alliance, an electoral alliance in Peru

== Entertainment ==
- Kim Possible, a US children's TV series

- Kim Possible (character), the central character of the TV series
- Kim Possible (video game series), games related to the TV series

- The Possible, a 2006 film
- The Possible (band), a Japanese band
- Possibility Pictures, a film production company which made the 2010 film Letters to God
- Possibility (album), a 1985 album by Akina Nakamori
- "Possibility" (song), a 2009 song by Lykke Li
- Possible (EP), a 1981 EP by Youth Brigade

== See also ==
- Impossible (disambiguation)
- Possibilities (disambiguation)
- Possible Worlds (disambiguation)
- Category:Possibly living people
- Absolutely (disambiguation)
- Definitely (disambiguation)
- Maybe (disambiguation)
