= Chrissy Metz =

American actress (born 1980)

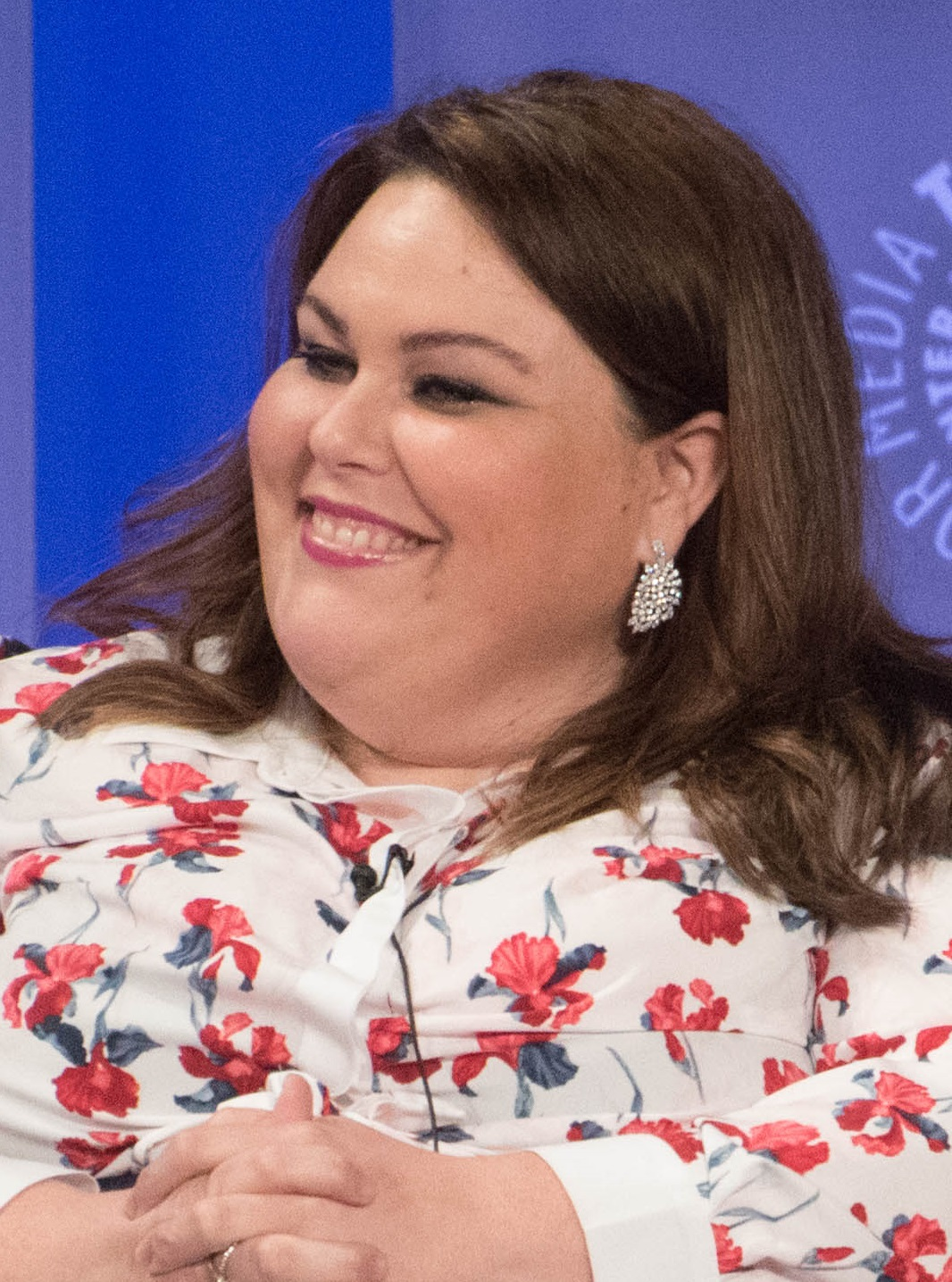
- Metz in 2017
- Born: September 29, 1980 (age 45); Homestead, Florida, U.S.
- Occupations: Actress, singer
- Years active: 2005–present
- Spouse: Martyn Eaden (m. 2008; div. 2015)

Chrissy Metz (born September 29, 1980) is an American actress and singer. She played Kate Pearson in the television series This Is Us (2016–2022), which earned her nominations for a Primetime Emmy Award and two Golden Globe Awards. She has also appeared in films such as Sierra Burgess Is a Loser (2018), Breakthrough (2019) and Faith in the Flames: The Nichole Jolly Story (2025).

== Early life ==
Metz was born in Homestead, Florida, on September 29, 1980. She spent her early years in Japan, where her father was stationed by the US Navy. The family later moved to Gainesville, Florida, where she attended elementary, middle, and high school. She grew up with her mother, stepfather, two siblings and two half-siblings.

Metz has said that her first job was at a McDonald's restaurant in Gainesville.

== Career ==
Metz played Kate Pearson in the NBC drama series This Is Us, which earned her Primetime Emmy Award and Golden Globe Award nominations. She played Ima Wiggles in FX's American Horror Story: Freak Show.

Metz is a singer in her band Chrissy and the Vapors.

In early 2018, it was announced that Metz would star in Breakthrough, working with producer DeVon Franklin. She is cast as Joyce Smith, the mother of John, a 14-year-old boy who fell through an icy Missouri lake and was proclaimed dead. The movie, based on the book written by Smith, explores the mother's belief that her son was brought back to life by God interceding through her and other's prayers. In 2021, Metz portrayed the ghost of Haunting Harriet in Muppets Haunted Mansion.

Metz studies with acting coach John Kirby.

In 2021, Metz was a guest panelist in season five of The Masked Singer where she appeared in its eighth episode. In 2024, she competed in season eleven as "Poodle Moth". After losing to contestant Thelma Houston as "Clock" in the knockoffs on "Shower Anthem Night", she was saved by Rita Ora who rang the Ding Dong Keep It On Bell due to the chanting of the audience. Metz was eliminated during the quarterfinals.

In November 2023, and again in December 2024, Metz was a guest narrator at Disney's Candlelight Processional at Walt Disney World. She was also a performer on the 2023 Wonderful World of Disney: Magical Holiday Celebration television special. In December of the same year, she sang "Silver Bells" in the holiday television special Christmas at the Opry.

== Personal life ==
On January 5, 2008, Metz married British journalist Martyn Eaden at the courthouse in Santa Barbara, California. They separated in January 2013, and Eaden filed for divorce from Metz in November 2014, citing "irreconcilable differences."

From 2016 to 2018, she dated Josh Stancil, who was a cameraman for This Is Us. She dated composer Hal Rosenfeld from 2018 to 2020.

From 2020 to 2023, she dated songwriter and former music executive Bradley Collins after meeting him on the dating app Bumble. They co-wrote a children's book When I Talk to God, I Talk About You.

Metz is a Christian.

== Filmography ==
=== Film ===
Year	Title	Role	Notes	Ref.
2007	Loveless in Los Angeles	Bonnie		
2008	The Onion Movie	Heavy Girl	Uncredited role	
2018	Sierra Burgess Is a Loser	Trish		
2019	Breakthrough	Joyce Smith		
2022	Stay Awake	Michelle	Also executive producer	
2023	A Creature was Stirring	Faith		
2025	Bank of Dave 2: The Loan Ranger	Jessica		

=== Television ===
Year	Title	Role	Notes	Ref.
2005	Entourage	Counter Girl	Episode: "The Sundance Kids"	
2005	All of Us	Ruby	Episode: "If You Can't Stand the Heat"	
2008	My Name Is Earl	Chunk	Episode: "We've Got Spirit"	
2009	Solving Charlie	Maggie Harmon	Television film	
2010	Huge	Shoshanna	Episode: "Talent Night"	
2014–2015	American Horror Story: Freak Show	Barbara/Ima Wiggles	Recurring role; 5 episodes	
2016–2022	This Is Us	Kate Pearson	Main role; 92 episodes	
2017	Drop the Mic	Herself	Episode: "David Arquette vs. Brian Tyree Henry / Jesse Tyler Ferguson vs. Chrissy Metz"	
2018	The Last O.G.	Pooh Cat	Episode: "Repass"	
2018–2019	Kung Fu Panda: The Paws of Destiny	Mei Mei	Voice role; 13 episodes	
2019	Superstore	Luanne	Episode: "#Cloud9Fail"	
2021	Muppets Haunted Mansion	Harriet	Television special	
2024	The Masked Singer	Herself / Poodle Moth	Season 11 contestant	
2025	Faith in the Flames: The Nicholle Jolly Story	Nicholle Jolly	Television film	
2025–present	The Hunting Wives	Starr	Main role; 7 episodes	
2026	Nocturne	Ida	Upcoming series	

=== Theater ===
Year	Title	Role	Venue	Notes	Ref.
2026	& Juliet	Angelique	Stephen Sondheim Theatre	Broadway debut	

== Awards and nominations ==
Year	Association	Category	Nominated work	Result
2017	Golden Globe Awards	Best Supporting Actress – Series, Miniseries or Television Film	This Is Us	Nominated
2017	MTV Movie & TV Awards	Next Generation Award	This Is Us	Nominated
2017	Primetime Emmy Awards	Outstanding Supporting Actress in a Drama Series	This Is Us	Nominated
2017	Teen Choice Awards	Choice TV Breakout Star	This Is Us	Nominated
2018	Critics' Choice Television Awards	Best Supporting Actress in a Drama Series	This Is Us	Nominated
2018	Golden Globe Awards	Best Supporting Actress – Series, Miniseries or Television Film	This Is Us	Nominated
2018	Screen Actors Guild Awards	Outstanding Performance by an Ensemble in a Drama Series	This Is Us	Won
2019	Screen Actors Guild Awards	Outstanding Performance by an Ensemble in a Drama Series	This Is Us	Won
2019	Teen Choice Awards	Choice Drama Movie Actress	Breakthrough	Nominated
2020	Movieguide Awards	Most Inspiring Performance in Movies	Breakthrough	Nominated
