= Impossible Pictures (US) =

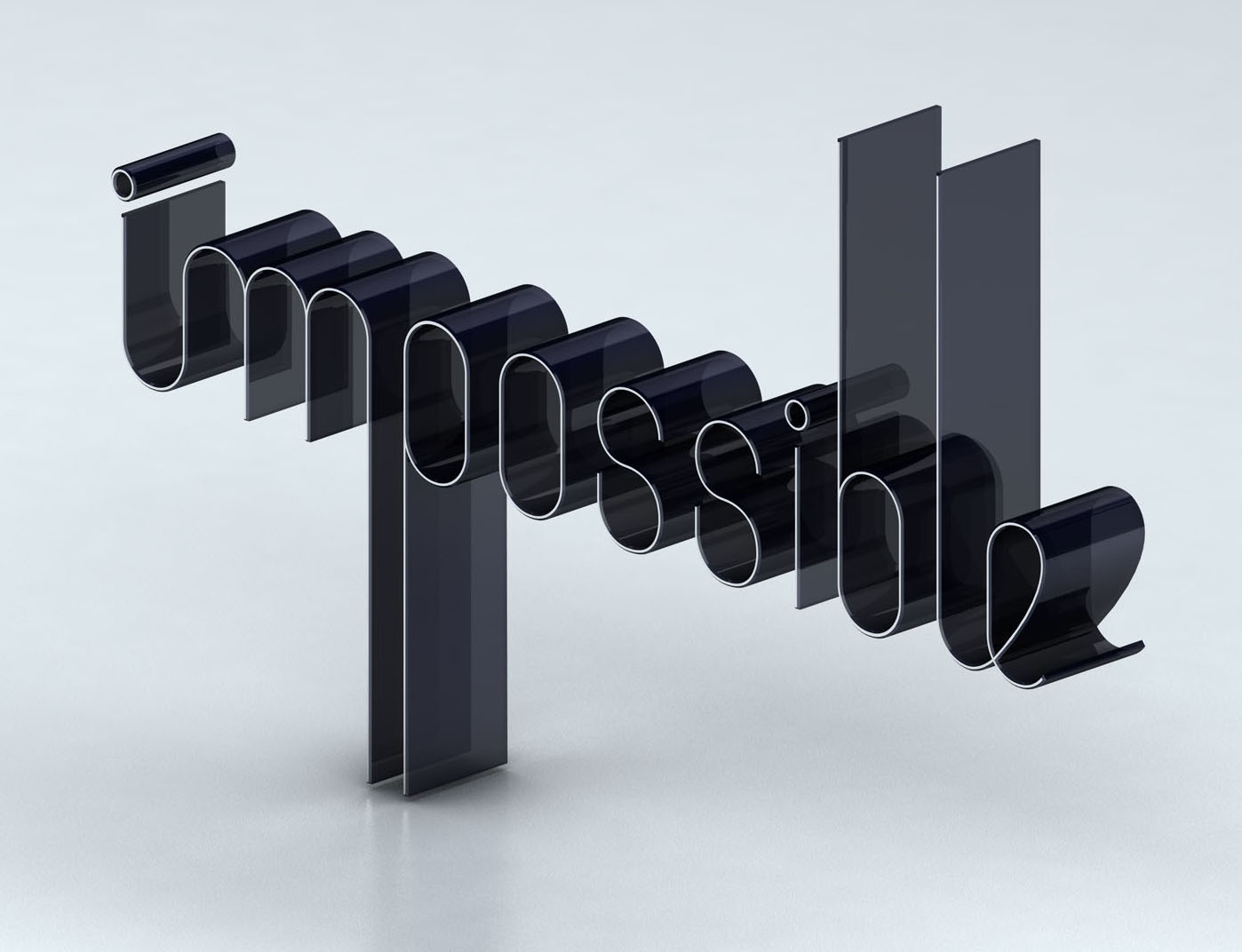
Impossible Logo

Impossible Pictures (Impossible) is a Denver-based production company and creative studio. Founded by Joel Pilger in 1994 under the name Visual Approach, Inc., the company began as a 3D animation studio. Visual Approach's first project was a 3D animated broadcast show open for the Charlotte Hornets NBA team. Other early projects included a 3D show open/title sequence for Walt Disney Television's Belle's Magical World (sequel to Beauty and the Beast), a 3D animated campaign for JWT client Ford's "Year End Clearance", and a show open/title sequence for Universal Studios' Balto II: Wolf Quest (sequel to Balto).

In 2002, the company was renamed Impossible Pictures and began its long relationship with DISH Network. Impossible's first project for DISH was development of the "DISH Character," which subsequently led to the production of multiple 3D animated spots and campaigns. In 2004, Impossible won its first Emmy Award for the 3D animated "Nutcracker" spot created for the Colorado Ballet. The company earned its first Gold BDA Award in 2005, for its work developing the on-air brand launch of Altitude Sports and Entertainment. This helped launch Impossible's move into network television promotion, as the company took on broadcast promo work for Science Channel, Discovery Channel, Travel Channel, National Geographic Channel and others.

In summer 2013, Impossible adopted a free-agent model used widely in film industry and moved its offices to Denver's River North Art District (RiNo). The company brought on associate producer Martha Douglas (formerly of Crispin Porter + Bogusky and Factory Design Labs) and marketing/client relations pro Emily O’Brien to work alongside Joel Pilger in staffing its projects from a pool of more than 200 free agent collaborators such as copywriters, designers, art directors, and editors.

Impossible's specializations include network branding, promos, commercials and integrations. Examples of Impossible's title and graphics work are on display as part of "The First Ladies’ Dresses" permanent exhibit at the Smithsonian.

== Television network campaigns ==
Impossible's live action television network projects include an image campaign for Military Channel called "People," for which Impossible enlisted creative directors Mitch Monson, Greg Herman and Héctor Espinosa; and a GAC image spot starring actor/musician John Corbett. Recent brand integrations produced by Impossible include 30-second spots merging the characters from Ice Age: Continental Drift and Discovery Channel; and Tanked (Animal Planet) with Toyota's Entune technology. The company's most recent motion graphic project involved a complete College Football graphics package for NBC Sports Network.

== Consumer product work ==
Impossible's recent consumer product work includes the DISH Network "Storybook Fairy" spot by Director/DP Kevin Emmons and featuring Atlanta Falcons future NFL Hall of Fame tight end Tony Gonzalez; and the Denver Museum of Nature & Science MythBusters spot by Director/DP Tom Camarda (CBS' The Mentalist). Previous campaigns include product launches for Blockbuster MoviePass and Inspirato.

== Films ==
Impossible contributed production, design and post-production for the 2006 film Mountain Town, an early example of branded content on behalf of Aspen Snowmass Ski Company.

In 2013, Impossible's Joel Pilger wrote, shot, directed and edited a short film titled "27 Million Stones" which spotlighted the efforts of nonprofit rescue organization The Exodus Road The three-minute video addresses human trafficking in the modern world and poses an answer.

== Sale of Impossible ==
In September 2014, Impossible was acquired by Influence Technologies. Pilger joined Influence as its chief experience officer, and Impossible Pictures ceased operation as an independent production company. One year later, Pilger parted ways with Influence and sold his remaining Impossible interests to IMPOSSIBLE X in order to focus on cinematography and consulting ventures at RevThink as an adviser to motion design studios and production companies, where he also curates the industry blog RevThinking.
