= Imposible (2004 film) =

- Directed by: Cristian Pauls
- Written by: Alan Pauls; Cristian Pauls
- Produced by: Carlos Bernst; Axel Pauls
- Starring: Jimena Anganuzzi; Vera Czemerinski; Francisco Fernández De Rosa; Damián de Santo; Alejandra Flechner
- Cinematography: Carlos Essmann
- Edited by: Julio Di Risio
- Release date: 20 March 2004 (France)
- Running time: 90 minutes
- Country: Argentina
- Language: Spanish

Imposible is a 2004 comedy-drama film directed by Cristian Pauls and written by Alan Pauls and Cristian Pauls. The cast includes Jimena Anganuzzi, Vera Czemerinski, Damián de Santo, Francisco Fernández de Rosa, and Alejandra Flechner.
