= Samuel Rodriguez =

American evangelist (born 1969)

- Education: Lehigh University (M.A. in Organization Leadership)
- Occupations: Founder and pastor, New Season Church
- Years active: 2010–present
- Spouse: Eva
- Children: 3
- Website: pastorsam.com

Samuel Rodriguez is an American Evangelical Christian leader raised by Puerto Rican parents in the United States. He is a pastor, movie producer, author, and civil rights activist. He is the president of the National Hispanic Christian Leadership Conference.

== Ministry ==
At age 16, Rodriguez delivered his first sermon. He soon gained acclaim as an evangelical preacher. In 1992, he became an ordained minister in the Assemblies of God, a Pentecostal denomination. In 2000, he founded the Hispanic Evangelical Christian organization National Hispanic Christian Leadership Conference (NHCLC/CONEL).

Rodriguez became a member of the board of the National Association of Evangelicals in 2006.

== Books and films ==
In June 2016, Rodriguez's book Be Light reached number 1 on the Los Angeles Times Bestseller List. You Are Next, released in 2019, reached the fourteenth position on Publishers Weekly's hardcover nonfiction frontlist sales chart.

Rodriguez was an executive producer of the 20th Century Fox motion picture Breakthrough, which received an Oscar nomination for Best Original Song and received a GMA Dove Award for Inspirational Film of the Year.

Rodriguez was an executive producer of the Fox Searchlight film Flamin' Hot, a biopic about the man behind Flamin' Hot Cheetos. The film was produced by DeVon Franklin of Franklin Entertainment and directed by Eva Longoria. The film became Fox Searchlight Pictures' most-watched streaming movie of all time. "The Fire Inside" from Flamin' Hot was nominated for an Academy Award for Best Original Song in 2024.

== Political activity ==
During the George W. Bush administration, Rodriguez advocated for bipartisan discussion on immigration reform. He was brought in as an advisor to President Bush and worked directly with the administration on its immigration reform efforts. Rodriguez later served in an advisory capacity for Presidents Obama and Trump. He participated in President Obama’s 2009 inaugural prayer service at Saint Johns Episcopal Church, reading from the Gospel of Luke. Rodriguez served on the President's Advisory Council for the White House Office of Faith-Based and Neighborhood Partnerships initiative with the Fatherhood and Healthy Families Task Force and also on the Abortion Reduction Task Force (both under President Obama). Throughout Obama’s presidency, Rodriguez engaged the White House on immigration, faith-based initiatives, and Latino issues while raising concerns on theological and political matters such as religious liberty. In a 2008 NPR interview, Michel Martin called Rodriguez "one of the country's most influential religious leaders".

Rodriguez delivered an invocation at the inauguration of Donald Trump on January 20, 2017. In his remarks, Rodriguez read from the Sermon on the Mount in Matthew 5. On Inauguration Day, Rodriguez was interviewed by CNN. Rodriguez met with Trump administration officials to discuss a comprehensive immigration reform measure that would provide a path to citizenship for undocumented immigrants.

Rodriguez and other evangelical leaders signed a January 2017 letter pressing Trump to reconsider his suspension of a refugee resettlement program as that suspension prevented refugees from several countries from emigrating to the U.S. The letter argued that the program provided a lifeline to many oppressed individuals and an opportunity for churches to minister to them.

Also in 2017, Rodriguez was involved in a conversation at the White House with Jared Kushner and Ivanka Trump that led to the creation of the First Step Act, which seeks to prevent individuals who have served time from returning to prison. At the onset of the COVID-19 pandemic, Rodriguez was a member of the Heritage Foundation's National Coronavirus Recovery Commission. In August 2020, he perform a memorial service for Robert Trump at the request of the Trump family.

During Donald Trump's second presidential administration, Rodriguez became a member of the White House Faith Office. He was among the group of faith leaders who laid hands on and prayed for Trump in the Oval Office on March 19, 2025. Rodriguez told the New York Times that through this the Faith Office, he and other faith leaders have had "unprecedented access" to the White House, resulting in "unparalleled commitment to affirming our Judeo-Christian value system".

In May 2026, Rodriguez spoke at Rededicate 250, a prayer rally held on the National Mall in Washington DC after President Trump suggested "bringing God back to the center of America".

== Board memberships ==
Rodriquez is a member of the board of trustees of Oral Roberts University and part of the Global Council of evangelist group Empowered21.

== Israel advocacy ==
Rodriguez advocates for the rights and protection of the state of Israel. He has been recognized by the Israel Allies Foundation as one of Israel's Top 50 Christian Allies in 2020 and 2022.

Rodriguez's work has been featured in the Jerusalem Post and has been covered by The Times of Israel. He has used his platform as the President of the National Hispanic Christian Leadership Conference (NHCLC) to encourage support for Israel among Christians.

Rodriguez signed the Bonhoeffer Declaration, a commitment to "combat antisemitism in our communities, nation, and the world".

These efforts have established him as one of the top Latino Christian Zionists in the world according to Marie Arana in her book Latino Land.

== Recognition ==
In 2009, CNN featured Rodriguez in their Latinos in America broadcast special, identifying him as one of the most influential Evangelical leaders in the Latino community.

Presented by the Congress of Racial Equality in 2011, Rodriguez was awarded the Martin Luther King Jr. Leadership Award.

In 2013, Rodriguez received a nomination for Time Magazine's "Top 100 Most Influential People." Additionally, in 2013, TIME featured him in their cover story titled “The Latino Reformation.”

Rodriguez has been a part of the Martin Luther King, Jr. Commemorative Service four times in 2010, 2011, 2013, and 2021.

In 2015, Latino Leaders Magazine included him on their "101 Most Influential Leaders" list as the first evangelical leader to make the list. The Wall St. Journal has called Rodriguez one of the top 12 Latino leaders. Rodriguez was also included in Charisma Magazine's "40 People Who Radically Changed Our World" series. He has received honorary doctorates from William Jessup University, Northwest University and Baptist University of the Americas. Rodriguez regularly comments for publications and media outlets such as CNN, Fox News, PBS, Telemundo, NBC and others.

In 2015, Rodriguez and his wife, Eva, received The Rosa Parks Courage Award for their civil rights work from the Southern Youth Leadership Development Institute (SYLDI) and the Montgomery Improvement Association (MIA). The award was granted in commemoration of the 60th anniversary of the Montgomery Bus Boycott.

In 2021, Rodriguez was named one of Israel's Top 50 Christian Allies by the Israel Allies Foundation.

In 2022. Deseret Magazine named Rodriguez one of their 20 "New Reformers", referring to faith leaders "challenging the conservative movement to change", citing his advocacy for granting immigrants immediate citizenship.

In 2024, NBC News stated he was on his way to become one of the most influential figures in American politics. The Christian Post Español subsequently profiled Rodriguez, chronicling his political influence.

In October, 2024, the Sacramento Bee ran a front-page feature on Rodriguez, telling his journey from a childhood in the Rust Belt city of Bethlehem, Pennsylvania, to becoming a voice in the Latino community.

In 2024, he received the Jerusalem Award from the Friends of Zion Museum for his advocacy.

In 2026, The Jerusalem Post and the International Fellowship of Christians and Jews named Rodriguez one of the 'Top 10 Christian Voices for Israel,' ranking him fifth on the list alongside Secretary of State Marco Rubio, actress Patricia Heaton, and singer CeCe Winans.

== See also ==
- List of Afro-Latinos

== Filmography ==
Film
Year	Title	Role
2023	Flamin' Hot	Executive Producer
2021	A Walking Miracle	Executive Producer
2020	My Brothers' Crossing	Executive Producer
2020	Trump 2024: The World After Trump	Himself
2019	Breakthrough	Executive Producer
2018	God's Not Dead: A Light in the Darkness	Himself
2017	In God We Trust: 9/11 Triumph from Tragedy	Himself
2015	Empowered 21: Jerusalem	Himself
2014	Un Reino Sin Fronteras	Himself
