= Marcel Ruiz (actor) =

Puerto Rican actor

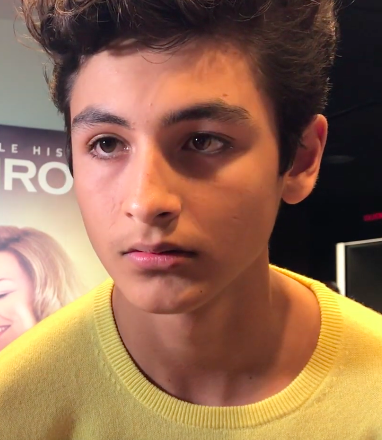
- Ruiz in 2019
- Born: Puerto Rico
- Occupation: Actor
- Years active: 2016–present

Marcel Ruiz is an Puerto Rican actor, known for his roles as Alex Alvarez in the series One Day at a Time and John Smith in the 2019 film Breakthrough.

== Career ==
Ruiz began his career acting in commercials at an early age. He moved to Los Angeles at age nine. Ruiz starred in the reboot of One Day at a Time as the character Alex Alvarez on Netflix (2017–2019) and Pop (2020). In 2019, he starred in Breakthrough, a drama film and true story, portraying the role of John Smith. He loves playing sports like basketball and soccer.

Ruiz was named as one of the "10 Latinxs to Watch in 2019", by Variety magazine.

His most recent role consists of playing the character Tyler Flores on The Body, as a younger male student.

== Filmography ==
Television and film roles
Year	Title	Role	Notes
2016	De Puerto Rico para el Mundo	Himself	Television documentary
2017	Snowfall	Popeye	2 episodes
2017–2020	One Day at a Time	Alejandro "Alex" Alvarez	Main role; Netflix (Season 1-3), Pop (Season 4)
2019	Breakthrough	John Smith	Film debut
2026	The Body	Tyler Flores	Recurring role
TBA	Porto Rico		Filming

== Awards and nominations ==
Year	Award	Category	Nominated work	Result
2017	Imagen Award	Best Young Actor	One Day at a Time	Won
2018	Imagen Award	Best Young Actor	One Day at a Time	Nominated
2019	Teen Choice Awards	Choice Comedy TV Actor	One Day at a Time	Nominated
