= Epistemic possibility =

Concept in philosophy and modal logic

In philosophy and modal logic, epistemic possibility relates a statement under consideration to the current state of our knowledge about the actual world: a statement is said to be:

- epistemically possible if it may be true, for all we know
- epistemically necessary if it is certain (or must be the case), given what we know
- epistemically impossible if it cannot be true, given what we know

Epistemic possibility is often contrasted with subjunctive possibility (or alethic possibility), and although epistemic and subjunctive possibilities are often expressed using the same modal terms (such as possibly, could be, must be) or similar modal terms that are sometimes confused (such as may be and might be), statements that are qualified in terms of epistemic possibility and statements that are qualified in terms of subjunctive possibility have importantly different meanings.

The contrast is best explained by example. Consider the two statements:

1. Japan might have been victorious in World War II
2. Japan may have been victorious in World War II

Although these two statements are often confused with one another, they mean two different things: the first says something true about the vagaries of war; the second says something that is certainly false. The difference comes from the fact that the first statement—a statement of subjunctive possibility—says something about how things might have been under counterfactual conditions, whereas the second—a statement of epistemic possibility—says something about the relation between a particular outcome (a victory by Japan) and our knowledge about the actual world (since, as it happens, we know perfectly well that that particular outcome did not actually obtain, we know that what it says is false).

The parallel distinction arises between types of conditionals (if-then statements). Consider the difference between the epistemic connection expressed by an indicative conditional and the causal or metaphysical relation expressed by a subjunctive conditional:

1. If Oswald didn't shoot Kennedy, someone else did
2. If Oswald hadn't shot Kennedy, someone else would have

The first statement says something that is certainly true, and will be accepted as such by anyone who is convinced that somebody shot Kennedy. It's clearly true because it expresses this epistemic relation between its antecedent (the "if"-clause) and its consequent (the "then"-clause): The antecedent, if we came to know it was true, would provide us with excellent evidence that the consequent is true. The second statement, on the other hand, expresses a causal or metaphysical relation: It says that the world was set up so that the consequent would have been made true if the antecedent were true. One will accept that second statement to the extent that one thinks the world was set up in that way. (Conspiracy theorists who think there was a back-up shooter, for instance, may accept the second statement.)

Because of these differences, epistemic possibility bears on the actual world in ways that subjunctive possibility does not. Suppose, for example, that one wants to know whether or not to take an umbrella before going outside. If one is told "It's possible that it is raining outside"—in the sense of epistemic possibility—then that would weigh on whether or not I take the umbrella. But if one is told that "It's possible for it to rain outside"—in the sense of metaphysical possibility—then one is no better off for this bit of modal enlightenment.
