= Black Reel Award for Outstanding Lead Performance, Drama Series =

Television award for lead drama actor at the Black Reel Awards

Black Reel Award for Outstanding Lead Performance, Comedy Series
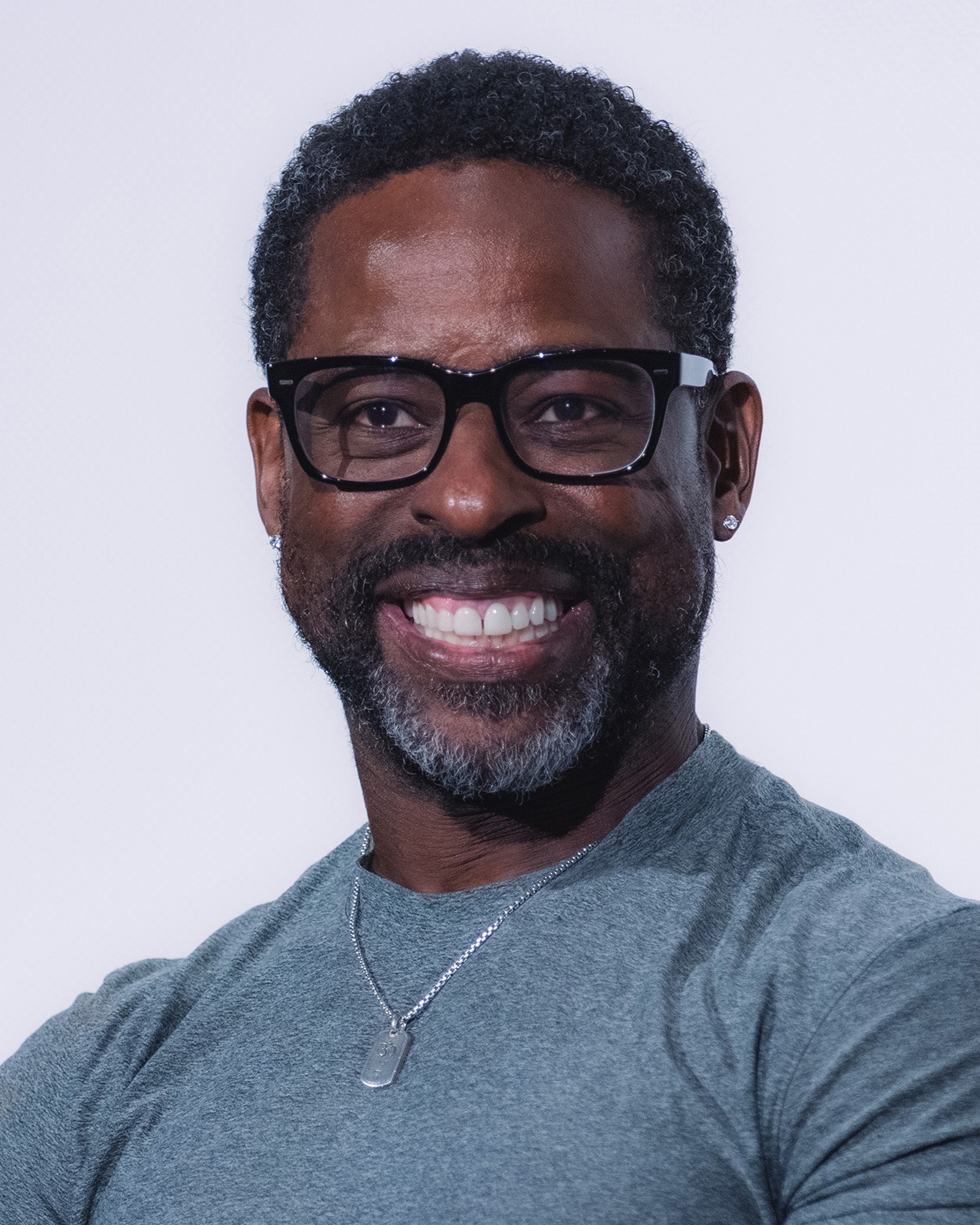
- The 2025 recipient: Sterling K. Brown
- Awarded for: Outstanding Performance
- Country: United States
- Presented by: Black Reel Awards (BRAs)
- First award: 2023
- Most recent winner: Sterling K. Brown; Paradise
- Website: blackreelawards.com

This article lists the winners and nominees for the Black Reel Award for Outstanding Lead Performance in a Drama Series. The award recognizes an actor or actress who delivers an outstanding performance in a leading role of a drama television series within the given eligible period.

The award was first presented at the 23rd Annual Black Reel Awards as a result of a merger between the Outstanding Actor and Outstanding Actress awards into a single gender-neutral award, with a total of ten nominees being selected.

== Winners and nominees ==
=== 2020s ===
Year	Actor	Role(s)	Series
2023
2023	Damson Idris	Franklin Saint	Snowfall
2023	Jacob Anderson	Louis de Pointe du Lac	Interview with the Vampire
2023	Nicco Annan	Uncle Clifford Sayles	P-Valley
2023	Jabari Banks	Will Smith	Bel-Air
2023	Angela Bassett	Athena Grant-Nash	9-1-1
2023	Queen Latifah	Robyn McCall	The Equalizer
2023	Patina Miller	Raquel Thomas	Power Book III: Raising Kanan
2023	Harold Perrineau	Boyd Stevens	From
2023	Octavia Spencer	Poppy Parnell	Truth Be Told
2023	Forest Whitaker	Bumpy Johnson	Godfather of Harlem
2024
2024	Idris Elba	Sam Nelson	Hijack
2024	Rosario Dawson	Ahsoka Tano	Ahsoka
2024	Aunjanue Ellis-Taylor	Carolyn Wilder	Justified: City Primeval
2024	Giancarlo Esposito	Gracián "Gray" Parish	Parish
2024	Donald Glover	John Smith / Michael	Mr. & Mrs. Smith
2024	Quincy Isaiah	Magic Johnson	Winning Time: The Rise of the Lakers Dynasty
2024	Queen Latifah	Robyn McCall	The Equalizer
2024	Sonequa Martin-Green	Michael Burnham	Star Trek: Discovery
2024	Zoe Saldaña	Joe McNamara	Lioness
2024	Omar Sy	Assane Diop	Lupin
2025
2025	Sterling K. Brown	Xavier Collins	Paradise
2025	Jacob Anderson	Louis de Pointe du Lac	Interview with the Vampire
2025	Michael Cooper Jr.	Justin Edwards	Forever
2025	Emayatzy Corinealdi	Jax Stewart	Reasonable Doubt
2025	Aldis Hodge	Alex Cross	Cross
2025	Lashana Lynch	Bianca Pullman	The Day of the Jackal
2025	Patina Miller	Raquel Thomas	Power Book III: Raising Kanan
2025	Harold Perrineau	Boyd Stevens	From
2025	Zoe Saldaña	Joe McNamara	Lioness
2025	Lovie Simone	Keisha Clark	Forever

== Multiple nominations ==
2 nominations

- Jacob Anderson
- Queen Latifah
- Patina Miller
- Harold Perrineau
- Zoe Saldaña

== Age superlatives ==
Record	Actor	Series	Age (in years)
Oldest winner	Idris Elba	Hijack	51
Oldest nominee	Giancarlo Esposito	Parish	66
Youngest winner	Damson Idris	Snowfall	32
Youngest nominee	Michael Cooper Jr.	Forever	23
