= Mad TV season 15 =

Season of television series

Mad TV
- Season 15
- No. of episodes: 8

Release
- Original network: The CW
- Original release: July 26 – September 27, 2016

Season chronology
- ← Previous; Season 14

The fifteenth and final season of the American sketch comedy series Mad TV premiered in the United States on The CW on July 26, 2016, and ended on September 27, 2016. It was a reboot of the original series which aired from 1995 to 2009.

== Summary ==
Seven years after the show ended on FOX (and in celebration of the show's 20th anniversary), MADtv was briefly revived for eight episodes on The CW (with episodes rerunning on streaming service Hulu).

On the casting front, Nicole Sullivan, Will Sasso, Ike Barinholtz, Bobby Lee, Debra Wilson, Aries Spears, Alex Borstein, Mo Collins, and Anjelah Johnson returned as guests. New cast members include Carlie Craig, Chelsea Davison, Jeremy D. Howard, Amir K (the show's first—and only—Middle Eastern cast member, as well as the second cast member after season one's Bryan Callen to be born outside of North America, and the only MADtv writer to be upgraded to cast member), Lyric Lewis, Piotr Michael, Michelle Ortiz, and Adam Ray.

== Cast ==
Repertory cast members

- Carlie Craig (Ariana Grande, Megyn Kelly, Kristin Chenoweth, Britney Spears, Ann Coulter, additional characters) (8/8 episodes)
- Chelsea Davison (Adele, Lena Dunham, Melissa McCarthy, additional characters) (8/8 episodes)
- Jeremy D. Howard (Kanye West, Tracy Morgan, Sumbrella, additional characters) (8/8 episodes)
- Amir K. (Terrence Howard [as Lucious Lyon from Empire], Scott Baio, additional characters) (8/8 episodes)
- Lyric Lewis (Rihanna, Nicki Minaj, Taraji P. Henson [as Cookie Lyon from Empire], Viola Davis, Octavia Spencer, additional characters) (8/8 episodes)
- Piotr Michael (Donald Trump, Jeff Goldblum, Jimmy Fallon, Seth Rogen, Arnold Schwarzenegger, additional characters) (8/8 episodes)
- Michelle Ortiz (Melania Trump, Raven-Symoné, Penélope Cruz, Idina Menzel, Dora the Explorer, additional characters) (8/8 episodes)
- Adam Ray (Pitbull, Alec Baldwin, Tony Danza, Wolf Blitzer, additional characters) (8/8 episodes)

=== Original cast ===
- Nicole Sullivan (Hillary Clinton & Darlene McBride)
- Will Sasso (Bill Clinton, Kenny Rogers, & Michael Mcloud)
- Bobby Lee (Blind Kung Fu Master, Tank, & Kim Jong-un)
- Debra Wilson (Phylicia Rashad [as Clair Huxtable], Tova McQueen, & Oprah Winfrey)
- Ike Barinholtz (additional characters)
- Aries Spears (Bill Cosby [as Dr. Heathcliff Huxtable], Belma Buttons, Stedman)
- Mo Collins (Carol Fitty, Lorraine, additional characters)
- Anjelah Johnson (Bon Qui Qui)
- Alex Borstein (Ms. Swan & Jasmine Wayne-Wayne)
- Stephnie Weir (Dot Goddard)

== Episodes ==
No. overall	No. in season	Title	Original release date	US viewers (millions)
322	1	"Episode 1"	July 26, 2016	0.81
Nicole Sullivan and Will Sasso welcome the new cast members, who say a demonic prayer to help them get through the first episode; CNN presents a political version of The Newlywed Game featuring Bill and Hillary Clinton (Sasso & Sullivan) vs. Donald and Melania Trump (Michael & Ortiz) rather than a legitimate debate, which depresses Wolf Blitzer (Ray); Dora the Explorer (Ortiz) explores the seedy side of Los Angeles; Elizabeth Warren (Craig) upstages Hillary Clinton (Sullivan) during a campaign speech; a couple can't keep up with a Game of Thrones recap; Kenny Rogers appears on The Bachelorette's landmark 56th season; HBO First Look goes behind the scenes of an animated reboot of Cinderella featuring the vocal "talents" of Nicki Minaj (Lewis), Steve Buscemi (Michael), Penelope Cruz (Ortiz), Lena Dunham (Davison), Kristen Stewart (Craig), Tony Danza (Ray), and Tracy Morgan (Howard); a woman's veteran ex-boyfriend becomes a lounge singer and sings about how she abandoned him and his daughter (Craig); Ned Stark (Michael) from Game of Thrones runs for President in 2016 and makes lewd comments about his daughter.
323	2	"Episode 2"	August 2, 2016	0.67
Ike Barinholtz meets Amir K and Piotr Michael and shows them secret compartments hiding booze, pills, and a feral Bobby Lee; Bobby Lee shows Ike Barinholtz their new child; a deranged woman known as Princess Polly (Craig) works the parking lot of a Disneyland-esque theme park; James Bond (Ray) gets rescued by The Blind Kung-Fu Master (Lee); a look at the Rio 2016 Olympics; Ike and Bobby go on Shark Tank; Lyric Lewis invites Idina Menzel (Ortiz) and Kristen Chenoweth (Craig) onstage to sing the national anthem; overly-sensitive millennials (Ortiz, K, Lewis, and Ray) host a college talk show called Safe Space and Melissa McCarthy (Davison) calls them out on their behavior; a third-grade teacher (Davison) has a solution to bullying in her classroom.
324	3	"Episode 3"	August 9, 2016	0.60
State Farm Insurance commercial parody where drivers summon their insurance agents during awkward moments; Debra Wilson and Aries Spears return; suicide hotline callers (K, Lewis & Ortiz) are plagued with calls from people who think the hotline is for spoilers about the movie Suicide Squad; an updated version of The Cosby Show centers on Bill Cosby's sexual misconduct; a ghetto court stenographer named Sumbrella (Howard) complicates a slip and fall case; Belma Buttons (Spears) and Tovah McQueen (Wilson) return for another installment of Reality Check where they call out Megyn Kelly (Craig); Octavia Spencer (Lewis) appears on an Iranian talk show; Jeff Goldblum (Michael) rambles his way through a grocery store commercial; sexual tension brews between Oprah Winfrey (Wilson) and her friend Gayle King (Lewis) during a WeightWatchers commercial.
325	4	"Episode 4"	August 23, 2016	0.66
Match Game gets a political, modern-day update hosted by Alec Baldwin (Ray); Mo Collins' Lorraine returns to annoy a gym trainer; new album recorded by a diabetic R&B singer (Howard); Donald Trump (Michael) and Hillary Clinton (Nicole Sullivan) sing a duet about the insanity and improbability of both of them running for U.S. President; an episode of The Tonight Show Starring Jimmy Fallon includes Ariana Grande (Craig) and Pitbull (Ray) playing knife games with Fallon (Michael) for charity; Donald Trump (Michael) spouts off on Confessions of a Terrifically Huge Mind; Talking Dead gets recursive with nested spin-offs; Darlene McBride (Sullivan) returns with her FOX News Car Karaoke special; Arnold Schwarzenegger (Michael) does a PSA against steroids.
326	5	"Episode 5"	August 30, 2016	0.70
Dora the Explorer (Ortiz) ventures to Las Vegas where she ends up at a strip club; Kim Jong-Un (Bobby Lee) joins the #RichKidsOfBeverlyHills on E!'s latest reality show; MTV's Flow welcomes a rapper whose lyrics aren't hardcore; Donald Trump (Michael) creates Trump Elementary and nearly makes out with his daughter, Ivanka (Craig); Jamiele Hall (Lewis) gets hit on by Tank (Lee); an Amish woman (Davison) is the entertainment at a bachelor party; a man from India (Amir K) struggles with baseball announcer banter; Bernie Sanders (Michael) fumbles with his new SmartPhone.
327	6	"Episode 6"	September 6, 2016	0.68
Anjelah Johnson gets too into her role as Bon Qui Qui; Sumbrella (Howard) gets into crime scene investigation; a Walking Dead cliffhanger stretches out the suspense to ridiculous levels; Bon Qui Qui (Johnson) returns to King Burger; Empire parody featuring Justin Timberlake (John Barinholtz), Adele (Davison), and Ariana Grande (Craig), trying to sign with Empire Records while putting up with the inside drama at the studio; Amir K rents out Adam Ray's, Carlie Craig's, and Michelle Ortiz's dressing rooms; a half-fish Kardashian sister (Davison) is introduced on Keeping Up with the Kardashians; a cooking show for stoners; a parody of $100,000 Pyramid; Bon Qui Qui plugs Homegirl Security.
328	7	"Episode 7"	September 20, 2016	0.58
"Hermanos Bros. Law"; Carlie Craig gains telekinetic powers after binge-watching Stranger Things; a "good cop/bad cop" scenario where the "bad cop" (Ray) is a douchebag; Britney Spears (Craig) reveals five secrets about herself; Miss Swan (Alex Borstein) becomes a cartoon character; advertisers try to make guns more appealing to American consumers; the female cast members play Fuck, Marry, Kill and Chelsea Davison reveals that she'd do all three to Piotr Michael; Alex Borstein and Will Sasso talk about their time on MADtv where they had it tougher than the new cast; Piotr Michael's Morgan Freeman narrator voice annoys a hungover Adam Ray; an HBO First Look at celebrity auditions for The Michael McLeod (Sasso) and Jasmine Wayne-Wayne (Borstein) Story; Piotr Michael annoys Lyric Lewis.
329	8	"Episode 8"	September 27, 2016	0.55
A crisis group centered on people who were injured while being saved by The Flash; Will Sasso and Bobby Lee play crazy ex-boyfriends; The Bachelor in Paradise shows indiscriminate hook-ups and a spreading herpes infection; Adam Ray needs a translator for the female cast members shortened slang; a wine steward (Ray) steals a man's girlfriend; Jeremy D. Howard reads his Yelp reviews; another installment of Iran's Hollywood Minute; Bernie Sanders (Michael) becomes KFC's new Colonel Sanders.

== Home release ==
Season 15 was temporarily available on Hulu when the series ran in 2016. As of 2026, this season is not legally available on a physical media release (DVD or Blu-ray), other streaming services (HBO Max, Howdy, and Tubi only run the FOX episodes of MADtv), or through digital download.
