= List of Walk the Prank episodes =

Walk the Prank is an American comedy television series created by Adam Small and Trevor Moore that premiered on Disney XD on April 1, 2016. The series stars Cody Veith, Bryce Gheisar, Brandon Severs, Jillian Shea Spaeder, Chloe Guidry and Tobie Windham.

== Series overview ==
| Season | Episodes | Originally released | |
| Season | Episodes | First released | Last released |
|---|---|---|---|
| 1 | 20 | April 1, 2016 | November 10, 2016 |
| Special | | March 20, 2017 | |
| 2 | 26 | April 1, 2017 | January 27, 2018 |
| 3 | 13 | April 21, 2018 | July 16, 2018 |

== Episodes ==
=== Season 1 (2016) ===
| No. overall | No. in season | Title | Directed by | Written by | Original release date | Prod. code | U.S. viewers (millions) |
|---|---|---|---|---|---|---|---|
| 1 | 1 | "Welcome to Walk the Prank" | Tom Gianas | Adam Small & Trevor Moore | April 1, 2016 (Note: This episode was shown as a preview on April 1, 2016, and then as the official series premiere on April 6, 2016. The viewership data is 0.55 million total viewers for the official premiere on April 6, 2016.) | 101 | 0.48 |
| 2 | 2 | "Crushed" | Tom Gianas | Adam Small & Trevor Moore | April 13, 2016 | 103 | 0.70 |
| 3 | 3 | "A Moving Situation" | Tom Gianas | Adam Small & Trevor Moore | April 20, 2016 | 104 | 0.65 |
| 4 | 4 | "School Clubbing" | Tom Gianas | Adam Small & Trevor Moore | April 27, 2016 | 105 | 0.48 |
| 5 | 5 | "Adventures in Babysitting" | Adam Small | Adam Small & Trevor Moore | June 17, 2016 | 116 | 1.44 |
| 6 | 6 | "LOL the Vote" | Tom Gianas | Adam Small & Trevor Moore | July 5, 2016 | 106 | 1.71 |
| 7 | 7 | "Fish You Were Here" | Tom Gianas | Adam Small & Trevor Moore | July 6, 2016 | 102 | 1.61 |
| 8 | 8 | "Baby Please" | Tom Gianas | Adam Small & Trevor Moore | July 7, 2016 | 107 | 1.40 |
| 9 | 9 | "The Moustached Kid" | Tom Gianas | Adam Small & Trevor Moore | July 8, 2016 | 108 | 1.47 |
| 10 | 10 | "Bailey's Band" | Tom Gianas | Adam Small & Trevor Moore | July 12, 2016 | 109 | 1.32 |
| 11 | 11 | "Wigging Out" | Tom Gianas | Adam Small & Trevor Moore | July 13, 2016 | 110 | 1.25 |
| 12 | 12 | "Spoiler Alert" | Tom Gianas | Adam Small & Trevor Moore | July 14, 2016 | 111 | 1.39 |
| 13 | 13 | "Whatever Gets You Through the Night" | Tom Gianas | Adam Small & Trevor Moore | July 15, 2016 | 112 | 1.37 |
| 14 | 14 | "Grandma's Here to Stay" | Tom Gianas | Adam Small & Trevor Moore | September 26, 2016 | 113 | 0.32 |
| 15 | 15 | "Prank or Treat" | Trevor Moore | Adam Small & Trevor Moore | October 10, 2016 | 115 | 0.25 (Note: This episode also premiered on Disney Channel on October 23, 2016, with a viewership of 0.93 total million viewers.) |
| 16 | 16 | "Talk the Prank with Jake and Logan Paul" | Unknown | Unknown | October 23, 2016 | 199 | 0.92 |
| 17 | 17 | "So You Think You Can Middle School Dance" | Adam Small | Angela Yarbrough | November 7, 2016 | 119 | 1.13 |
| 18 | 18 | "Stuck" | Unknown | Unknown | November 8, 2016 | 117 | 1.06 |
| 19 | 19 | "Blind Date" | Tom Gianas | Adam Small & Trevor Moore | November 9, 2016 | 114 | 1.19 |
| 20 | 20 | "Up All-Nighter" | Trevor Moore | Jamie Abrams | November 10, 2016 | 118 | 1.21 |

=== Special (2017) ===
| No. | Title | Directed by | Written by | Original release date | Prod. code |
|---|---|---|---|---|---|
| 21 | "Talk the Prank with Thomas Sanders and David Lopez" | Unknown | Unknown | March 20, 2017 | TBA |

=== Season 2 (2017–18) ===
| No. overall | No. in season | Title | Directed by | Written by | Original release date | Prod. code | U.S. viewers (millions) |
|---|---|---|---|---|---|---|---|
| 22 | 1 | "Dino Safari VR" | Adam Small | Adam Small & Trevor Moore | April 1, 2017 | 201 | 0.27 |
| 23 | 2 | "Party Hearty" | Adam Small | Adam Small & Trevor Moore | April 1, 2017 | 205 | 0.26 |
| 24 | 3 | "Dear Me" | Adam Small | Adam Small & Trevor Moore | April 8, 2017 | 204 | 0.22 |
| 25 | 4 | "Party at Gordy's" | Trevor Moore | Adam Small & Trevor Moore | April 8, 2017 | 202 | 0.28 |
| 26 | 5 | "A Very Vlad Joke" | Trevor Moore | Adam Small & Trevor Moore | April 15, 2017 | 206 | 0.31 |
| 27 | 6 | "Allowance Drama" | Tom Gianas | Adam Small & Trevor Moore | April 15, 2017 | 207 | 0.32 |
| 28 | 7 | "Teachers Break Their Promises" | Tom Gianas | Adam Small & Trevor Moore | April 22, 2017 | 208 | 0.32 |
| 29 | 8 | "Anne Comes to School" | Tom Gianas | Adam Small & Trevor Moore | April 22, 2017 | 209 | 0.34 |
| 30 | 9 | "Will vs. Will" | Tom Gianas | Adam Small & Trevor Moore | April 29, 2017 | 210 | 0.22 |
| 31 | 10 | "K.C. Undercover Edition" | Adam Small | Adam Small & Trevor Moore | May 27, 2017 | TBA | 0.25 |
| 32 | 11 | "Herman Gets Shredded" | Trevor Moore | Tom Gianas | July 29, 2017 | TBA | 0.12 |
| 33 | 12 | "Float Like a Butterfly, Sting Like a Flea" | Troy Rowland | Stephen Fontanella | July 29, 2017 | TBA | 0.14 |
| 34 | 13 | "The Earth Gets Mooned" | Ken Ceizler | Richard Lowe | August 21, 2017 | TBA | 0.12 |
Guest star: Biff Yeager as Mr. Borkman
| 35 | 14 | "Walk the Prank: NFL Edition" | Adam Small | Adam Small & Trevor Moore | September 2, 2017 | 223 | 0.24 |
Special guest stars: Jay Ajayi as himself, Michael Bennett as himself, Cairi Champion as herself, Melvin Gordon as himself, Jarvis Landry as himself, Josh Norman as himself, Jason Witten as himself Guest stars: Aimee McKay as Principal Becky Snyder, Biff Yeager as Mr. Borkman
| 36 | 15 | "No Debating Bailey" | Trevor Moore | Brian Hartt | October 2, 2017 | 226 | 0.08 |
Guest stars: Debra Wilson as Ms. Spencer, Gannon Hays as Drama Drew, Jim Meskimen as Judge
| 37 | 16 | "A Star Is Not Born" | Troy Rowland | Angela Yarbrough | October 3, 2017 | TBA | N/A |
| 38 | 17 | "Death of a Lima Bean" | Troy Rowland | Adam Small & Trevor Moore | October 4, 2017 | TBA | 0.08 |
| 39 | 18 | "Can't Crush This" | Troy Rowland | Sam Littenberg-Weinberg & Erica Spates | October 5, 2017 | TBA | N/A |
| 40 | 19 | "A Night Witch You'll Always Remember" | Tom Gianas | Adam Small & Trevor Moore | October 9, 2017 | 211 | N/A |
| 41 | 20 | "The Rise and Fall of Courtney Lynn" | Tom Gianas | Adam Small & Trevor Moore | October 10, 2017 | TBA | 0.10 |
| 42 | 21 | "Big Mother Is Watching" | Trevor Moore | Adam Small & Trevor Moore | October 11, 2017 | TBA | 0.11 |
| 43 | 22 | "Follow Your Memes" | Adam Small | Adam Small & Trevor Moore | October 12, 2017 | TBA | N/A |
| 44 | 23 | "End of the World (Wide Web)" | Troy Rowland | Adam Small & Trevor Moore | October 16, 2017 | 220 | N/A |
| 45 | 24 | "An Alarming Situation" | Troy Rowland | Adam Small & Trevor Moore | October 17, 2017 | TBA | N/A |
| 46 | 25 | "Walk the Prank: WWE Edition" | Trevor Moore | Adam Small & Trevor Moore | November 18, 2017 | 222 | 0.18 |
WWE superstars: Big E, Kofi Kingston, Alexa Bliss, Diamond Dallas Page, Stings Guest stars: Aimee McKay as Principal Becky Snyder, Biff Yeager as Mr. Borkman, Rachel Gage as Courtney Lynn
| 47 | 26 | "Too Cool for High School" | Wendy Faraone | Darrin Bragg | January 27, 2018 | TBA | 0.22 |

=== Season 3 (2018) ===
| No. overall | No. in season | Title | Directed by | Written by | Original release date | Prod. code | U.S. viewers (millions) |
|---|---|---|---|---|---|---|---|
| 48 | 1 | "Fallout Shelter" | Adam Small | Adam Small & Trevor Moore | April 21, 2018 | 301 | 0.13 |
| 49 | 2 | "There's a New Kid in Town" | Trevor Moore | Adam Small & Trevor Moore | April 28, 2018 | 302 | N/A |
| 50 | 3 | "Substitute Dad" | Adam Small | Adam Small & Trevor Moore | May 5, 2018 | TBA | 0.19 |
| 51 | 4 | "The Alex Baldwin Blues Explosion" | Trevor Moore | Adam Small & Trevor Moore | May 12, 2018 | TBA | 0.18 |
| 52 | 5 | "Say Goodnight to J.D." | Adam Small | Adam Small & Trevor Moore | May 19, 2018 | TBA | 0.13 |
| 53 | 6 | "Walk the Prank: NBA Edition" | Adam Small | Adam Small & Trevor Moore | June 2, 2018 | TBA | 0.25 |
| 54 | 7 | "Slumber Party" | Troy Rowland | Adam Small & Trevor Moore | June 9, 2018 | TBA | 0.18 |
| 55 | 8 | "My Dad is Cooler than Your Dad" | Trevor Moore | Adam Small & Trevor Moore | June 16, 2018 | TBA | 0.19 |
| 56 | 9 | "Lord of the Gummy Worms" | Trevor Moore | Adam Small & Trevor Moore | June 18, 2018 | TBA | 0.18 |
| 57 | 10 | "CSI: Aaron Burr" | Troy Rowland | Angela Yarbrough | June 25, 2018 | TBA | 0.13 |
| 58 | 11 | "Joke Shop Nightmare" | Wendy Faraone | Adam Small & Trevor Moore | July 2, 2018 | TBA | 0.13 |
| 59 | 12 | "Penultimate" | Wendy Faraone | Adam Small & Trevor Moore | July 9, 2018 | TBA | 0.17 |
| 60 | 13 | "The Wedding" | Trevor Moore | Adam Small & Trevor Moore | July 16, 2018 | TBA | N/A |
