= Jeremy Howard =

Jeremy Howard may refer to:

- Jeremy Howard (entrepreneur) (born 1973), Australian scientist and entrepreneur
- Jeremy Howard (actor) (born 1981), American actor
- Jeremy D. Howard, American actor on MADtv

== See also ==
- Jeremy Howard-Williams (1922–1995), fighter pilot and author
- Curly Howard (Jerome Lester "Jerry" Horwitz, 1903–1952), American comedian and vaudevillian actor
