= Benjamin Wadsworth =

Benjamin Wadsworth may refer to:

- Benjamin Wadsworth (clergyman) (1670–1737), American Congregational clergyman and educator
- Benjamin Wadsworth (actor) (born 1999), American actor
