= Just Roll with It =

2019 American television series

- Genre: Family comedy
- Created by: Adam Small; Trevor Moore
- Starring: Ramon Reed; Kaylin Hayman; Suzi Barrett; Tobie Windham; JC Currais
- Theme music composer: Phil Hernandez; Chris Maxwell; Trevor Moore; Adam Small
- Composers: Chris Maxwell; Phil Hernandez
- Country of origin: United States
- Original language: English
- No. of seasons: 2
- No. of episodes: 43

Production
- Executive producers: Adam Small; Trevor Moore; James Widdoes
- Cinematography: George Mooradian; Bill Berner
- Camera setup: Multi-camera
- Running time: 23–30 minutes
- Production companies: Kenwood TV Productions; Blackbird Films; Sullen Child

Original release
- Network: Disney Channel
- Release: June 14, 2019 – May 14, 2021

Just Roll with It is an American family comedy television series created by Adam Small and Trevor Moore. It aired on Disney Channel from June 14, 2019, to May 14, 2021, and stars Ramon Reed, Kaylin Hayman, Suzi Barrett, Tobie Windham, and JC Currais.

== Premise ==
The series follows the blended Bennett-Blatt family as they navigate everyday life in Akron, Ohio. During certain scenes, a foghorn signals for the actors to break character while the live studio audience chooses from three possible outcomes. The selected option determines how the scene continues. If two choices receive the same number of votes, both are incorporated into the episode, requiring the cast to "just roll with it".

== Cast and characters ==
=== Main ===
- Ramon Reed as Owen Blatt, a model student who skipped a grade and prefers rules and schedules. He is Byron's son, Rachel's stepson, and Blair's stepbrother.
- Kaylin Hayman as Blair Bennett, Rachel's daughter, Byron's stepdaughter, and Owen's stepsister. She is more rebellious and impulsive than Owen.
- Suzi Barrett as Rachel Bennett, a military veteran and the general manager of BEATZ 101. She is Blair's mother, Owen's stepmother, and Byron's wife.
- Tobie Windham as Byron Blatt, an on-air personality at BEATZ 101. He is Owen's father, Blair's stepfather, and Rachel's husband.
- JC Currais as The Gator (recurring, season 1; main, season 2), Byron's co-host at BEATZ 101.

=== Recurring ===
- Lela Brown as DJ Lela B, a rapper and DJ who performs near the studio audience.
- Michael Lanahan as Mr. Penworth, Owen and Blair's teacher.
- Candace Kozak as Ruth, Blair's best friend and a friend of Owen.
- John Ratzenberger as George Bennett, Rachel's father and Blair's grandfather. He moves in with the family after being removed from his retirement home and later marries Nana Blatt.

=== Guest stars ===
- John Michael Higgins as Caleb Barnswallow, a former Army friend of Rachel whom Blair dislikes.
- Raven-Symoné as Betsy Hagg, a woman who claims to be a vampire.
- Miranda May as Mrs. Polapamus.
- Jason Earles as Skeeter Swindell.

== Production ==
=== Development ===
On October 24, 2018, Disney Channel ordered Just Roll with It, a multi-camera family comedy combining scripted scenes with improvisational elements. The series was created and executive produced by Adam Small and Trevor Moore.

=== Broadcast and renewal ===
The first episode aired as a special preview on June 14, 2019, followed by the series' regular premiere on June 19.

A live interactive special, Just Roll with It: You Decide Live!, aired on October 4, 2019. It was hosted by Issac Ryan Brown, Ruby Rose Turner, and Ruth Righi, with Raven-Symoné and Miranda May appearing as guest stars.

Disney Channel renewed the series for a second season on September 10, 2019, and entered an overall development agreement with Small and Moore. Production of the second season began that month. In December 2021, TVLine reported that the second season had been the series' final season.

== Episodes ==
=== Series overview ===
Season	Episodes	Originally released	
Season	Episodes	First released	Last released
1	22	June 14, 2019	March 8, 2020
2	21	March 15, 2020	May 14, 2021

=== Season 1 (2019–20) ===
No. overall	No. in season	Title	Directed by	Written by	Original release date	Prod. code	U.S. viewers (millions)
1	1	"Career Day Catastrophe"	James Widdoes	Trevor Moore & Adam Small	June 14, 2019	101	0.65
Blair chooses Byron instead of Rachel to accompany her to Career Day, upsetting Rachel and creating tension within the family. Owen attempts to mediate the disagreement and encourages Rachel to explain her feelings to Blair. Guest stars: Lela Brown as DJ Lela B, Michael Lanahan as Mr. Penworth
2	2	"The Birthday War"	Jon Rosenbaum	Trevor Moore & Adam Small	June 19, 2019	102	0.50
Owen decides that he has outgrown a birthday tradition he shares with Byron but is reluctant to tell his father. Meanwhile, Blair becomes upset after learning that Owen has invited her former best friend Ruth to their joint birthday party. Blair initially tries to embarrass Owen by exposing the tradition, but she changes her mind after realizing that she was responsible for ending her friendship with Ruth. Owen eventually admits that he dislikes the tradition, only to learn that Byron continued it because he thought Owen enjoyed it. Guest stars: Lela Brown as DJ Lela B, Michael Lanahan as Mr. Penworth, Candace Kozak as Ruth
3	3	"Blair Gets Grounded"	Leonard R. Garner Jr.	Trevor Moore & Adam Small	June 26, 2019	104	0.53
Rachel grounds Blair after learning that she and Ruth plan to revive their Drama Sisters club. Byron is placed in charge of enforcing the punishment but instead takes Blair to a movie with The Gator. Meanwhile, Rachel and Owen cause a disturbance while playing laser tag and are escorted from the building. Rachel then discovers that Byron ignored Blair's punishment, prompting him to acknowledge that he needs to be more consistent as a parent. Guest stars: Lela Brown as DJ Lela B, Michael Lanahan as Mr. Penworth, Candace Kozak as Ruth, JC Currais as The Gator, Joe DeRosa as Manager, Sam Brown as Iago
4	4	"No Thank You for Your Service"	Robbie Countryman	Desirée Proctor & Erica Harrell	July 3, 2019	106	0.34
Guest stars: Lela Brown as DJ Lela B, Candace Kozak as Ruth, Bruno Amato as Major Michael Winston, Heather Woodward as Patriotic Patty
5	5	"Date Fright"	Wendy Faraone	Brandon Cohen	July 10, 2019	103	0.45
Guest star: Lela Brown as DJ Lela B
6	6	"Karate Wars IV: Dawn of the Karate Wars"	Leonard R. Garner Jr.	Sam Miller	July 17, 2019	109	0.43
Guest stars: Lela Brown as DJ Lela B, JC Currais as The Gator, Cazzey Louis Cereghino as Alex the Arm Wrestler
7	7	"The Elevator"	Trevor Kirschner	Trevor Moore & Adam Small	July 24, 2019	108	0.47
Guest stars: Lela Brown as DJ Lela B, JC Currais as The Gator, Toshiji Takeshima as Henry, Masa Kanome as Ninja Matthew
8	8	"Bringing Up Toilet"	Wendy Faraone	Jessica Kaminsky	September 13, 2019	115	0.48
Guest stars: Lela Brown as DJ Lela B, Candace Kozak as Ruth
9	9	"General Nuisance"	Leonard R. Garner Jr.	Calise Hawkins	September 20, 2019	113	0.45
Guest stars: Lela Brown as DJ Lela B, John Michael Higgins as Caleb
10	10	"And Gator Makes Five"	Wendy Faraone	Trevor Moore & Adam Small	September 27, 2019	110	0.40
The Gator is forced to leave the boat on his mother's property after dismissing one of her conspiracy theories. Byron allows him to stay with the Bennett-Blatt family while he attempts to reconcile with his mother, forcing Blair and Owen to share a bedroom. The Gator's behavior soon frustrates the household, and Byron visits his mother to persuade her to take him back. She eventually contacts the Gator and allows him to return to his boat. Guest stars: Lela Brown as DJ Lela B, JC Currais as The Gator, Amos Glick as Zombie
11	11	"You Decide LIVE!"	Sandra Restrepo	Trevor Moore & Adam Small	October 4, 2019	TBA	0.52
Starring: JC Currais Special guest stars: Raven-Symoné as Betsy Hagg, Miranda May as Mrs. Polapamus Musical appearance by: Kylie Cantrall Hosted by: Issac Ryan Brown, Ruth Righi, Ruby Rose Turner Guest stars: Lela Brown as DJ Lela B, Kingston Foster as Tex, Savannah Hubbard as Weird Kid, Maddison Hubbard as Weird Kid's Twin, Melanie Mosley as Female Henchman, Sam Allen as Technical Difficulty Dinosaur
12	12	"Root of All Fears"	Wendy Faraone	Phillip Walker	October 11, 2019	112	0.54
Guest stars: Lela Brown as DJ Lela B, Michael Lanahan as Mr. Penworth, Candace Kozak as Ruth, Shaw Jones as Dr. Payne
13	13	"The Tutor"	Robbie Countryman	Lee House	October 18, 2019	111	0.48
Guest stars: Lela Brown as DJ Lela B, Michael Lanahan as Mr. Penworth, Candace Kozak as Ruth, Cody Veith as Jim, Frances Callier as Lunch Lady, Katie Rowe as Choo-Choo the Great
14	14	"Snow Way Out"	Adam Small	Jonathan De Weerd & Keerthi Harishankar	October 25, 2019	118	0.47
Guest stars: Lela Brown as DJ Lela B, Michael Lanahan as Mr. Penworth, JC Currais as The Gator
15	15	"Gator's Reunion"	Trevor Moore	Trevor Moore & Adam Small	November 1, 2019	117	0.49
Guest stars: Lela Brown as DJ Lela B, Candace Kozak as Ruth, JC Currais as The Gator, Zach Cregger as Brent
16	16	"The Big Sneak"	Wendy Faraone	Jessica Kaminsky	November 15, 2019	105	0.36
Guest stars: Lela Brown as DJ Lela B, Johnny Pemberton as Lil Pouty, Jeremy D. Howard as Dante, Jason Medwin as Rabbit, Christopher Matthew Cook as Mr. Nice Guy, Frances Callier as Lunch Lady
17	17	"Family Squabbles"	Wendy Faraone	Trevor Moore & Adam Small	November 22, 2019	114	0.42
Guest stars: Lela Brown as DJ Lela B, JC Currais as The Gator, Gary Anthony Williams as Smiley Waterman
18	18	"Owenfest"	Robbie Countryman	Brandon Cohen	November 29, 2019	116	0.35
Guest stars: Lela Brown as DJ Lela B, Michael Lanahan as Mr. Penworth, Candace Kozak as Ruth, Gina Hecht as Elaine the Lunch Lady
19	19	"Merry Christmas, Mr. Gooch"	Trevor Moore	Trevor Moore & Adam Small	December 6, 2019	120	0.39
Guest stars: Lela Brown as DJ Lela B, JC Currais as The Gator, Charles Shaughnessy as Sir Liam Gooch
20	20	"Owen and Blair in the Morning"	Trevor Kirschner	Trevor Moore & Adam Small	February 23, 2020	107	0.43
Guest stars: Lela Brown as DJ Lela B, Michael Lanahan as Mr. Penworth, JC Currais as The Gator, Malachi Barton as Tyber, Frances Callier as Lunch Lady
21	21	"The People vs. Blair Bennett"	Adam Small	Lee House	March 1, 2020	119	0.30
Blair is accused of vandalizing the school lockers with the initials "BB" and requests a trial in student court. Owen represents her, Ruth serves as the prosecutor, and Mr. Penworth acts as judge. Evidence initially appears to implicate Blair, including a can of matching spray paint found in her backpack. Owen later discovers that the initials stand for "Basement Bruhs," the name of Norvin Schnuckle's video channel, proving that he committed the vandalism. Guest stars: Lela Brown as DJ Lela B, Michael Lanahan as Mr. Penworth, Candace Kozak as Ruth, Michael Lininger as Topher
22	22	"Byron & The Gator: The Far Side of the World"	Kelly Park	Trevor Moore & Adam Small	March 8, 2020	121	0.23
Guest stars: Lela Brown as DJ Lela B, JC Currais as The Gator

=== Season 2 (2020–21) ===
No. overall	No. in season	Title	Directed by	Written by	Original release date	Prod. code	U.S. viewers (millions)
23	1	"Grandpa Moves In"	Leonard R. Garner Jr.	Trevor Moore & Adam Small	March 15, 2020	201	0.36
Guest stars: Lela Brown as DJ Lela B, Michael Lanahan as Mr. Penworth, John Ratzenberger as Grandpa, Paul Rogan as Official, Bo Kane as Coach, Bil Dwyer as Referee, Nate Boyer as Football Kicker
24	2	"The Most Brilliant Blair in the World"	Leonard R. Garner Jr.	Jessica Kaminsky	March 22, 2020	202	0.35
Guest stars: Lela Brown as DJ Lela B, John Ratzenberger as Grandpa, Dayna Dooley as Calliope
25	3	"The Great Coconuts Caper"	Robbie Countryman	Brandon Cohen	March 29, 2020	204	0.39
Guest stars: Lela Brown as DJ Lela B, John Ratzenberger as Grandpa, Bobby Costanzo as Joey Coconuts, Jillian Shea Spaeder as Bum-Around Bobbi
26	4	"Grandpa Gets Grounded"	Robbie Countryman	Phillip Walker	April 5, 2020	205	0.31
Guest stars: Lela Brown as DJ Lela B, Michael Lanahan as Mr. Penworth, Candace Kozak as Ruth, John Ratzenberger as Grandpa
27	5	"Grandma & Grandpa Sittin' in a Tree"	Wendy Faraone	Trevor Moore & Adam Small	April 19, 2020	203	0.37
Guest stars: Lela Brown as DJ Lela B, John Ratzenberger as Grandpa, Debra Wilson as Nana, Mark Aaron Wagner as Waiter
28	6	"Aliens Among Us"	Danielle Fishel	Marisol Diaz	October 16, 2020	211	0.30
Guest stars: Lela Brown as DJ Lela B, Lance Bonza as Mr. Allen, Kaitlyn Clare as Mrs. Allen, Seneca Paliotta as Ashley Allen
29	7	"Shayna Pennsylvania"	Wendy Faraone	Trevor Moore & Adam Small	October 23, 2020	206	0.32
Guest stars: Lela Brown as DJ Lela B, Michael Lanahan as Mr. Penworth, Tay Zonday as Talk Show Host, Jason Earles as Skeeter Swindell
30	8	"The Preventers Directive"	Wendy Faraone	Trevor Moore & Adam Small	November 6, 2020	208	0.28
Guest stars: Lela Brown as DJ Lela B, Charles Shaughnessy as Sir Liam Gooch, Johnny Pemberton as Lil Pouty, Jeremy D. Howard as Dante, Arnold Chun as Akachan Yamamoto
31	9	"The Preventers Directive: Part Two: The End Part"	Trevor Moore	Trevor Moore & Adam Small	November 13, 2020	209	0.31
Guest stars: Lela Brown as DJ Lela B, Charles Shaughnessy as Sir Liam Gooch, Johnny Pemberton as Lil Pouty, Jeremy D. Howard as Dante, Arnold Chun as Akachan Yamamoto
32	10	"Owen's Bromance"	Wendy Faraone	Erica Eastrich	November 20, 2020	207	0.38
Guest stars: Lela Brown as DJ Lela B, Kei as Kyle
33	11	"Maybe Baby"	Adam Small	Laura Moses	November 27, 2020	210	0.22
Guest stars: Lela Brown as DJ Lela B, Miles Hayden as Billy
34	12	"The Most Wonderful Crime of the Year"	Trevor Moore	Trevor Moore & Adam Small	December 11, 2020	218	0.35
BEATZ 101 prepares to broadcast a charity special titled "Christmas with Byron and The Gator". Rachel imposes strict rules on the crew and hires a magician who is also her former boyfriend, making Byron jealous. When the magician's props are destroyed and he collapses, Owen investigates while Rachel tries to keep the broadcast running. Officer Tabitha McKlunkey arrives after a crew member contacts the station's executives. Owen identifies Ken, a crew member who sabotaged the show in retaliation for Rachel locking the restrooms. McKlunkey declines to punish him after deciding that Rachel's restrictions were worse and instead subjects Rachel to the show's Festive Face Smasher. The Gator later reveals that Sir Liam Gooch considered the incident a success because it increased the broadcast's ratings and donations. Guest stars: Lela Brown as DJ Lela B, Victoria Antionette as Tabitha McKlunkey, Kurt Braunohler as Svan, Joe Hart as Poppa Rosenbaum, Mark Birch as Ken, Percy Rustomji as Blitzen the Reindeer
35	13	"Just Reminisce with It!"	Allison Scagliotti	Jared Logan	March 19, 2021	212	0.35
Guest stars: Lela Brown as DJ Lela B, Michael Lanahan as Mr. Penworth, Jim Meskimen as Snootly
36	14	"Warlock World: War of the Warlocks"	Allison Scagliotti	Desirée Proctor & Erica Harrell	March 26, 2021	213	0.22
Guest stars: Lela Brown as DJ Lela B, Jeremy Guskin as Chuck Spiner, Clint Howard as Adrian Rose, Danielle Jalade as Jazzlynn, Paisley Gladzer as Betty Bubblegum
37	15	"A League of Their Owen"	Wendy Faraone	Marina Quintero	April 2, 2021	214	0.29
Guest stars: Lela Brown as DJ Lela B, Michael Lanahan as Mr. Penworth, Cameron Bender as DJ Dirty Dan, Tiernan Jones as Dirty Dan Jr., Telci Huynh as Dirty Danielle Jr., Sanya Richards-Ross as herself, Heather Mitts as herself, Amanda Beard as herself
38	16	"The Great Switchy Witchy"	Wendy Faraone	Marie Cheng	April 9, 2021	215	0.28
Guest stars: Lela Brown as DJ Lela B, Michael Lanahan as Mr. Penworth
39	17	"In da Club"	Adam Small	Jonathan De Weerd	April 16, 2021	216	0.25
Guest stars: Lela Brown as DJ Lela B, Michael Lanahan as Mr. Penworth, Kei as Kyle, Matt Shea as Klaus, Lisa M. Varon as Tilda
40	18	"The Blair Crush Project"	Kim Wayans	Jessica Kaminsky	April 23, 2021	217	0.26
Guest stars: Lela Brown as DJ Lela B, Michael Lanahan as Mr. Penworth, Candace Kozak as Ruth, Orestes Arcuni as Loco Pollo Larry
41	19	"Blair Bennett - Child Activist"	Kelly Elizabeth Jensen	Brandon Cohen	April 30, 2021	219	0.24
Guest stars: Lela Brown as DJ Lela B, Michael Lanahan as Mr. Penworth, Candace Kozak as Ruth, Frances Callier as Lunch Lady, Lowell Deo as Chip Challumway
42	20	"Lightning and Lockdown"	Robbie Countryman	Trevor Moore & Adam Small	May 7, 2021	220	0.19
Guest stars: Lela Brown as DJ Lela B, Candace Kozak as Ruth, Kei as Kyle
43	21	"Before the Beginning"	Robbie Countryman	Trevor Moore & Adam Small	May 14, 2021	221	0.27
Guest stars: Lela Brown as DJ Lela B, Michael Lanahan as Mr. Penworth, Cameron Bender as Dirty Dan, Dorien Wilson as Mr. Yarburry

== Shorts ==
=== Roll It Back (2019–20) ===
The shorts feature cast members recapping episodes and discussing notable moments from the series.

No.	Title	Online release date
1	"This Season On"	June 19, 2019
2	"The Birthday War"	June 22, 2019
3	"Blair Gets Grounded"	June 29, 2019
4	"No Thank You for Your Service"	July 6, 2019
5	"Date Fright"	July 14, 2019
6	"Karate Wars"	July 20, 2019
7	"The Elevator"	July 27, 2019
8	"And Gator Makes Five"	September 27, 2019
9	"The Tutor"	October 19, 2019
10	"The Big Sneak"	November 16, 2019
11	"Bloopers!"	January 4, 2020
12	"Owen and Blair in the Morning"	February 23, 2020

== Ratings ==
Viewership and ratings per season of Just Roll with It
Season	Episodes	First aired		Last aired		Avg. viewers (millions)
Season	Episodes	Date	Viewers (millions)	Date	Viewers (millions)	Avg. viewers (millions)
1	22	June 14, 2019	0.65	March 8, 2020	0.23	0.44
2	21	March 15, 2020	0.36	May 14, 2021	0.27	0.30

== Awards and nominations ==
Year	Award	Category	Nominee	Result
2022	Children's and Family Emmy Awards	Outstanding Cinematography for a Live Action Multiple Camera Program	Joseph Wilmond Calloway	Nominated
