= Megan Danso =

Canadian actress

- Born: Victoria, British Columbia, Canada
- Occupation: Actress
- Years active: 2007–present

Megan Danso is a Canadian actress.

== Life and work ==
Megan Danso was born in Victoria, British Columbia.

Danso first appeared in an episode of the television series Painkiller Jane in 2007, and thenafter in Canadian television series and television films, among them The Troop (2009), Supernatural (2013) and Almost Human in 2014. She also played supporting roles in Jennifer's Body in 2009 and Fifty Shades of Grey in 2015. Her probably best known role is the recurring character Denny (Deni) in the third and fourth seasons of the US-Canadian SciFi series Falling Skies.

== Filmography ==
Year	Title	Role	Notes
2007	Painkiller Jane	Celia	TV series, 1 episode
2009	One Cadillac Drive	Brenda	Short film
2009	Jennifer's Body	Girl (uncredited)	
2009	The Troop	Quinn	TV series, 2 episodes
2013	Supernatural	Josephine Barnes	TV series, 1 episode
2013	The Killing	Tiffany Rogers	TV series, 1 episode
2013	Cult	True Believer #1	TV series, 1 episode
2013	Continuum	CPS Officer	TV series, 1 episode
2014	Almost Human	Elinor Church	TV series, 1 episode
2015	Fifty Shades of Grey	Female Grad	
2015	Motive	Skunk	TV series, 1 episode
2013–2015	Falling Skies	Deni	TV series, 12 episodes
2016	A Doll House/Pavlovia	Internee #3	Short film
2016	The 100	Grounder Woman	TV series, season 3; 2 episodes
2019	The 100	Layla	TV series, season 6; 3 episodes
2025	The Vince Staples Show	Sam	TV series, season 2; 1 episode
2026	Voicemails for Isabelle	Zella	
