= Ali Gallo =

American actress

- Born: July 12 2002
- Education: University of Southern California
- Occupation: Actress
- Years active: 2014-

Ali Gallo is an American television and film actress. Her film roles include Unhuman (2022) and Incoming (2024).

== Career ==
Gallo had early acting roles in Bunk'd, Virtual Morality, and Mindy Kaling's teen series The Sex Lives of College Girls. In 2022, Gallo portrayed the role of Tamra in the comedy horror film Unhuman for Blumhouse Productions.

Gallo played Alyssa Nielsen, the sister of lead character Benj Nielsen, in the coming-of-age teen comedy film Incoming in 2024. In 2024, she could also be seen in comedy independent film I Hate Myself and Want To Die, appearing alongside Mike Castle. Additionally, in 2024, Gallo was cast in the television series Forever, an adaptation for Netflix of the novel of the same name, written by Judy Blume. The series was released on May 8, 2025.

== Personal life ==
Currently resides in Los Angeles.

== Partial filmography ==
Year	Title	Role	Notes
2014-2015	Virtual Morality	Holly	3 episodes
2021	Bunk'd	Melody Chapman	1 episode
2021	The Sex Lives of College Girls	Lindsay	1 episode
2022	Unhuman	Tamra	lead role
2024	Incoming	Alyssa Nielsen	Main cast
2024	I Hate Myself and Want To Die	Hayley	Film
2025	Forever	Chloe	Series
