= Niles Fitch =

American actor (born 2001)

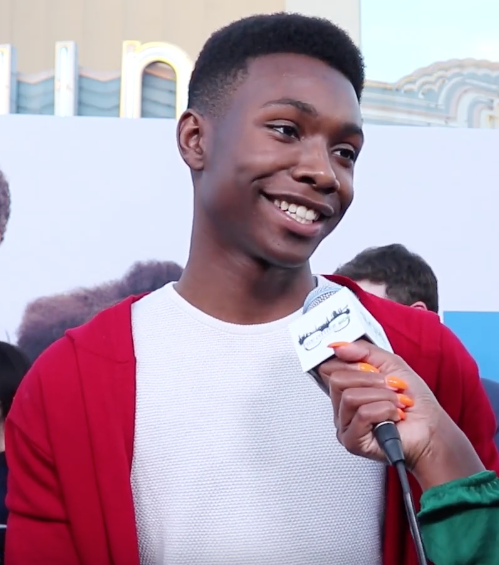
- Fitch in 2019
- Born: July 12, 2001 (age 24); Atlanta, Georgia, U.S.
- Occupation: Actor
- Years active: 2011–present
- Relatives: Rayshard Brooks (cousin)

Niles Fitch (born July 12, 2001) is an American actor who began his career as a child actor. He gained prominence through his role in the NBC series This Is Us (2016–2022). He received praise for his performance in the film The Fallout (2021).

== Personal life ==
Fitch was born in Atlanta, Georgia to Frederick and Nakata Fitch, Niles currently lives in Los Angeles, California where he studies at the University of Southern California, School of Cinematic Arts. He has expressed a desire to be known as a separate entity from creative labels and hence, is dabbling in behind-the-camera work in addition to acting and related artistic endeavours. His father, Frederick, died from lupus when Niles was 12 years old. He has since collaborated with Lupus LA as an ambassador in spreading awareness- contributing to the lives of people who live with lupus. In 2024, Fitch graduated from the University of Southern California.

Fitch was the cousin of Rayshard Brooks, a 27-year-old African American man fatally shot by the Atlanta Police Department on June 12, 2020.

== Career ==
Fitch started print modeling when he was four years old. His first job was in a back-to-school ad for Parisian. He then made his stage debut in the 2012 North American tour of The Lion King as Young Simba's replacement. He also played Emmanuel in the 2014 Off-Broadway show, Our Lady of Kibeho.

He made his television debut with a guest appearance in Tyler Perry's House of Payne, followed by a recurring role in Season 7 of Army Wives. His early film credits include St. Vincent and Roman J. Israel, Esq.

Fitch was cast to play a young version of Randall Pearson in the NBC series This Is Us, a role that has won him an ensemble Screen Actors Guild Award. He, along with the rest of the teenage cast, was promoted to series regular from Season 2 onwards.

Fitch had roles in 2019 films If Not Now, When? and Miss Virginia. In May 2019, it was announced that Fitch would star as Prince Tuma in the 2020 Disney+ film Secret Society of Second-Born Royals. In August 2020 it was announced that Fitch had begun filming The Fallout, which was finally released in 2021.

== Filmography ==
=== Film ===
| Year | Title | Role | Notes |
|---|---|---|---|
| 2014 | St. Vincent | Brooklyn | |
| 2017 | Roman J. Israel, Esq. | Langston Bailey | |
| 2019 | If Not Now, When? | Michael | |
| 2019 | Miss Virginia | James Walden | |
| 2020 | Secret Society of Second-Born Royals | Prince Tuma | Disney+ film |
| 2021 | The Fallout | Quinton Hasland | |
| 2023 | We Have a Ghost | Fulton Presley | |

=== Television ===
| Year | Title | Role | Notes |
|---|---|---|---|
| 2011 | Tyler Perry's House of Payne | Tommy Brooks | Episode: "Do the Fight Thing" |
| 2013 | Army Wives | Deuce | Recurring role (season 7), 9 episodes |
| 2015 | Law & Order: Special Victims Unit | Keon Williams | Episode: "Transgender Bridge" |
| 2016 | Unbreakable Kimmy Schmidt | Tyler | Episode: "Kimmy Meets a Celebrity!" |
| 2016 | Best Friends Whenever | Elliott | Episode: "Girl Code" |
| 2016 | Mistresses | Noel | 4 episodes (season 4) |
| 2016–22 | This Is Us | 16–21 Year Old Randall | Recurring role (season 1); main role (season 2–6) |
| 2019 | Drunk History | Michael Patrick | Episode: “Good Samaritans” |
| 2019 | Atypical | Lacrosse Sam | 3 episodes |
| 2020 | Social Distance | Lee Graham | Episode: "everything is v depressing rn" |
| 2021 | Mixed-ish | Jay | Episode: "On My Own" |
| 2024 | That '90s Show | Cole Carson | 3 episodes |
| 2025 | Forever | Darius | Series Regular |

== Stage ==
| Year | Title | Role | Notes |
|---|---|---|---|
| 2012 | The Lion King | Young Simba (replacement) | North American tour |
| 2014 | Our Lady of Kibeho | Emmanuel | Pershing Square Signature Center, Off-Broadway |

== Awards and nominations ==
| Year | Award | Category | Work | Result | Ref. |
|---|---|---|---|---|---|
| 2012 | Young Artist Awards | Best Performance in a TV Series - Guest Starring Young Actor Ten and Under | Tyler Perry's House of Payne | Nominated | |
| 2012 | Young Artist Awards | Best Performance in Live Theater - Young Actor | The Lion King, North American Tour | Nominated | |
| 2019 | Screen Actors Guild Awards | Outstanding Performance by an Ensemble in a Drama Series | This Is Us | Won | |
