= Ramon Reed =

American actor (born 2005)

- Born: August 3, 2005 (age 21); Charlotte, North Carolina, U.S.
- Occupation: Actor
- Years active: 2017–present

Ramon Reed is an American actor. He is known for portraying Young Simba in the Broadway and North American touring productions of The Lion King and Owen Blatt in the Disney Channel comedy series Just Roll with It. His film roles include Eddie in the Netflix films 13: The Musical and Incoming.

== Early life and stage career ==
Reed is from Charlotte, North Carolina. He began appearing in local theatrical productions at the age of five and sang in his church's choir.

In 2017, Reed attended an open casting call in New York City and was selected to portray Young Simba in the North American touring production of The Lion King. He performed in thirteen cities during approximately ten months with the tour.

Reed later performed the role on Broadway at the Minskoff Theatre in 2018.

== Screen career ==
In October 2018, Reed was cast as Owen Blatt in Just Roll with It, a Disney Channel comedy series that combined scripted scenes with improvisational sequences selected by a studio audience. He portrayed Owen in the series from 2019 to 2021.

In 2021, Reed was cast as Eddie in Netflix's film adaptation of the stage musical 13. The film, titled 13: The Musical, was released in August 2022.

In 2024, Reed portrayed Eddie in the Netflix comedy film Incoming.

In 2025, Reed appeared as Dominic in "Pull List", an episode of the Apple TV+ anthology series Side Quest.

In May 2025, Reed was announced as one of the lead actors in the comedy film Bad Counselors, alongside Matt Cornett and Chris Klein. Reed portrays Tyler Newman in the film. The film is scheduled for a limited theatrical engagement from July 23 through July 27, 2026.

=== Film ===
Year	Title	Role	Notes
2022	13: The Musical	Eddie	
2024	Incoming	Eddie	
2026	Bad Counselors	Tyler Newman	Scheduled limited theatrical release

=== Television ===
Year	Title	Role	Notes
2019–2021	Just Roll with It	Owen Blatt	Main role
2022	9-1-1: Lone Star	Parker	Episode: "Riddle of the Sphynx"
2022	That Girl Lay Lay	Ray Ray	Episode: "Fami-Lay-Lay-Reunion"
2022	The Goldbergs	Brett	Episode: "DKNY"
2025–2026	Wizards Beyond Waverly Place	Silas Evilini	4 episodes
2025	Side Quest	Dominic	Episode: "Pull List"

=== Stage ===
Year	Production	Role	Notes
2017–2018	The Lion King	Young Simba	North American tour and Broadway
