= Unhuman (film) =

2022 American film by Marcus Dunstan

- Official release poster
- Directed by: Marcus Dunstan
- Written by: Patrick Melton; Marcus Dunstan
- Produced by: Paige Pemberton; Paul Uddo
- Starring: Brianne Tju; Benjamin Wadsworth; Uriah Shelton; Ali Gallo; Peter Giles
- Cinematography: Lyn Moncrief
- Edited by: Andrew Wesman
- Music by: Charlie Clouser
- Production companies: Blumhouse Television; Epix
- Distributed by: Paramount Home Entertainment
- Release date: June 3, 2022
- Running time: 90 minutes
- Country: United States
- Language: English

Unhuman (stylized as unHUMAN) is a 2022 American comedy horror film directed by Marcus Dunstan, and written by Dunstan and Patrick Melton. The film stars an ensemble cast, featuring Brianne Tju, Benjamin Wadsworth, Uriah Shelton, Ali Gallo, and Peter Giles. Jason Blum serves as an executive producer through his Blumhouse Television banner.

It is an Epix original film and a production of Blumhouse Television, with Paramount Home Entertainment releasing the film digitally on June 3, 2022.

== Plot ==
Evanston Hill High School teacher Mr. Lorenzo supervises as students board a bus for a field trip. Ever, an average girl with low self-esteem, boards with her best friend Tamra. Other students include Randall and Steven, two bullied loners who harbor crushes on Tamra and Ever; Danny, a jock; Hunt, Danny's best friend; Jacey, Danny's girlfriend; Ryan, an overweight outcast; and Candice, a nerdy girl. A sudden burst of blood on the windshield causes the driver, Wayne, to crash the bus in a forest. An emergency radio broadcast warns of a nearby chemical attack, but Lorenzo commands the radio be turned off. Lorenzo then orders the bus doors opened to let in a bloodied Chip, a burnout metalhead who appears to be a mutated zombie, despite everyone on the bus insisting otherwise. In the ensuing chaos, Ever, Tamra, Randall, Steven, Danny, Hunt, and Jacey escape into the woods and seek safety in an abandoned building. Ryan joins them later. Meanwhile, Chip attacks Candice and others back on the bus.

Ever attempts to help Candice when she tries to join everyone in the building, but the other students deem rescuing her too risky, so they let Chip attack Candice again. Wayne, having seemingly mutated into a zombie like Chip, attacks everyone inside. Classmates who were also apparently transformed capture Hunt. Ever, Tamra, Randall, Steven, Danny, Jacey, and Ryan regroup in a room where they find mannequins dressed to resemble them, realizing someone has specifically targeted them all. Wayne suddenly attacks again, but Randall beats him. Danny begins transforming after being stabbed with something during the commotion. Wayne rises to tackle Danny through a window onto the ground outside. Danny initially appears dead, but surprisingly contorts and runs off.

Ever leaves Tamra behind after they argue about Tamra ignoring their friendship to align with the "jocks". Ever and Steven return to the bus to look for a phone, but Ever gets distracted by the radio and discovers the emergency broadcast was actually a tape recording. Steven apologetically injects Ever from behind. Before passing out, Ever sees Randall join Steven. A flashback shows that weeks earlier, Randall enlisted Steven for a scheme modeled after "Scared Straight!" where they would stage a zombie attack to get revenge on their bullies while looking like heroes to Tamra and Ever. Wayne volunteers, while ex-con and former student Chip creates a dangerous drug to make people behave like zombies. Back in the present, Randall brings Steven back to the building to check on the students they injected and took captive, including Danny and Hunt. Meanwhile, Ever gathers enough strength to use a boom box to beat Chip.

Tamra finds Randall, who lies that zombies killed Ever. After Steven secretly injects the captive students with more of Chip's drug, Randall arms Tamra, Ryan, and Jacey with weapons as he rallies them to kill their supposedly transformed classmates. Ever suddenly interrupts to tell everyone the truth about Randall and Steven's plot. Tamra hits Randall, who inadvertently reveals a vanity mural he previously painted that depicts him and Steven as mythic heroes saving Tamra and Ever from zombified bullies. With the secret now fully exposed, Ever's allies rescue Danny and lock Steven in a cage with Hunt and the other ravenous "zombies". Everyone then fights with Randall, who gravely wounds Danny, as Ever uses a makeshift Freddy Krueger glove that Chip created to stab Randall with several syringes of the drug. Randall reforms as a "zombie". Tamra, Jacey, Candice, and another rescued young woman named Juniper team up to take Randall down, with Ever finishing him off.

Hours later, Wayne, Chip, Randall, and Steven are all taken captive. The bullies and outcasts bond, with Ever and Tamra reconciling. After everyone boards the bus to leave, they discover Mr. Lorenzo is still alive.

Weeks later, PTA worker Ms. Operative visits Randall and Steven in prison and explains that the PTA is bringing back the "Scared Straight" program, inviting them to be the masterminds.

== Cast ==
- Brianne Tju as Ever
- Benjamin Wadsworth as Randall
- Uriah Shelton as Danny
- Ali Gallo as Tamra
- Peter Giles as Mr. Lorenzo
- Drew Scheid as Steven
- Josh Mikel as Chip
- Lo Graham as Jacey
- CJ LeBlanc as Hunt
- Blake C. Burt as Ryan
- Tonny Donno as Wayne / Bus Driver
- Emma Fitzpatrick as MS Operative
- Traysion Wilburn as Growth Spurt
- Dana Wing Lau as Ever's Mom
- Angel Lia Spitale as Juniper

== Production ==
In June 2021, Unhuman was announced as part of Blumhouse Television and Epix's TV movie deal, with Marcus Dunstan directing and Paul Soter writing, who previously worked on Blumhouse's Into the Dark, and the cast was revealed. Filming commenced around the same time in New Orleans. In November 2021, Dunstan and his frequent writing partner, Patrick Melton, officially received final writing credits for the film, with no credit to Soter.

== Release ==
A trailer was released on May 9, 2022, and Unhuman was released digitally in the United States by Paramount Home Entertainment on June 3, 2022.

== Reception ==
=== Critical response ===
On the review aggregator website Rotten Tomatoes, 56% of 18 critics' reviews are positive, with an average rating of 4.90/10.
