= Social Distance (TV series) =

- Genre: Anthology
- Created by: Hilary Weisman Graham
- Music by: Jonathan Sanford
- Country of origin: United States
- Original language: English
- No. of seasons: 1
- No. of episodes: 8

Production
- Executive producers: Jenji Kohan; Tara Herrmann; Hilary Weisman Graham; Blake McCormick
- Producers: Alex Orr; Ashley Glazier
- Cinematography: Pedro Luque; Mark Schwartzbard; Alison Kelly; Michael Berlucchi
- Editors: Liza Cardinale; Tyler L. Cook; Amy Fleming
- Running time: 18–23 minutes
- Production companies: Tilted Productions; Wordless Pictures

Original release
- Network: Netflix
- Release: October 15, 2020

Social Distance is an American anthology television miniseries created by Hilary Weisman Graham that premiered on October 15, 2020, on Netflix. The series was "conceived, cast and executed entirely remotely during quarantine". The eight-part series, set during the first months of the COVID-19 pandemic, focuses on how families, friends, and couples were forced to cope with the effects of quarantine as well as the Black Lives Matter protests following the murder of George Floyd. Each episode tells a different story and shows "the power of the human spirit in the face of uncertainty and isolation," and how technology was used to stay connected during quarantine.

== Episodes ==
No.	Title	Directed by	Written by	Original release date
1	"Delete All Future Events"	Anya Adams	Hilary Weisman Graham	October 15, 2020
A man talks to some of his friends and his support group via videotelephony about what he went through in the past and tries to stay sober. Cast : Mike Colter, Heather Burns, Okieriete Onaodowan, Ajay Naidu, Shakira Barrera, Steven Weber, Helena Howard, Isabella Ferreira
2	"A Celebration of the Human Life Cycle"	Diego Velasco	Tara Herrmann	October 15, 2020
A family grieves via videotelephony after a member passes away. The family has numerous issues including arguments and unnecessary interruptions. Cast : Oscar Nuñez, Daphne Rubin-Vega, Guillermo Diaz, Miguel Sandoval
3	"And We Could All Together/Go Out on the Ocean"	Phil Abraham	Merritt Tierce	October 15, 2020
A woman cares for a senior while trying to help her daughter who is home alone. Cast : Danielle Brooks, Marsha Stephanie Blake, Isabella Ferreira, Misha Brooks
4	"Zero Feet Away"	Claire Scanlon	Anthony Natoli	October 15, 2020
A bickering couple is brought to reality as they navigate the COVID pandemic and other issues. Cast : Brian Jordan Alvarez, Max Jenkins, Peter Vack, Rana Roy
5	"You Gotta Ding-Dong Fling-Flong the Whole Narrative"	Nick Sandow	Tara Herrmann	October 15, 2020
A man tries to take care of his son as his wife suffers from COVID. Cast : Peter Scanavino, Ali Ahn, Tami Sagher, Barbara Rosenblat, Michael Mulheren
6	"Humane Animal Trap"	Jesse Peretz	Teleplay by : Heather Jeng Bladt; Story by : Heather Jeng Bladt & Kirsa Rein	October 15, 2020
An older couple argues about different things as they navigate COVID. Cast : Becky Ann Baker, Dylan Baker, Marcia DeBonis, Raymond Anthony Thomas, Sunita Mani
7	"Everything Is V Depressing RN"	Angela Barnes	Anthony Natoli	October 15, 2020
A young girl (about 17 years old) has a crush on a boy in her Esports-team and is shy, so she turns to one of her friends for advice. In the end she is shocked to see some of the boy's posts on social media. Cast : Kylie Liya Page, David Iacono, Lachlan Riley Watson, Niles Fitch
8	"Pomp and Circumstance"	Anya Adams	Teleplay by : Brandon Martin; Story by : Brian Chamberlayne	October 15, 2020
A young Black man (about 20 years old) is floored when his older Black boss refuses to give him the afternoon off so he can go to a Black Lives Matter protest following the murder of George Floyd. The two have a (purportedly generational) clash, and arguments are exchanged. Cast : Asante Blackk, Ayize Ma'at, Lovie Simone

== Reception ==
For the series, review aggregator Rotten Tomatoes reported an approval rating of 58% based on 12 reviews, with an average rating of 6.8/10. The website's critics consensus reads, "Aided greatly by its solid cast, Social Distance sustains a surprising amount of energy given its subject matter and format - still, it's a little too close to home to fully succeed." Metacritic gave the series a weighted average score of 56 out of 100 based on nine reviews, indicating "mixed or average reviews".
