= 13: The Musical =

2022 Netflix film

- Official poster
- Directed by: Tamra Davis
- Screenplay by: Robert Horn
- Based on: 13 by Jason Robert Brown; Robert Horn; Dan Elish
- Produced by: Bob Boyett; Laurence Mark; Neil Meron
- Starring: Eli Golden; Gabriella Uhl; JD McCrary; Lindsey Blackwell; Frankie McNellis; Debra Messing; Rhea Perlman; Josh Peck; Peter Hermann
- Cinematography: Adam Santelli
- Edited by: Joe Galdo
- Music by: Christopher Lennertz
- Production company: Zadan/Meron Productions
- Distributed by: Netflix
- Release date: August 12, 2022
- Running time: 94 minutes
- Country: United States
- Language: English

13: The Musical is a 2022 American musical coming-of-age comedy-drama film directed by Tamra Davis and written by Robert Horn. It is based on the 2007 stage musical 13 by Horn, Jason Robert Brown, and Dan Elish. The ensemble cast includes Eli Golden, Gabriella Uhl, JD McCrary, Lindsey Blackwell, Frankie McNellis, Jonathan Lengel, Ramon Reed, Nolen Dubuc, Luke Islam, Liam Wignall, Shechinah Mpumlwana, Khiyla Aynne, Kayleigh Cerezo, and Willow Moss, with Debra Messing, Rhea Perlman, Josh Peck, and Peter Hermann.

After an earlier film adaptation was developed by CBS Films in 2014, Netflix announced its version in 2019, with Davis directing and Horn adapting the musical for the screen. The young ensemble was announced in April 2021, followed by the adult cast in May and June. Filming took place in Ontario, including Beeton and Oakville.

The film premiered at the Paris Theater in New York City on August 8, 2022, and was released by Netflix on August 12. It received mixed reviews from critics.

== Plot ==
After his parents separate, 12-year-old Evan Goldman moves with his mother, Jessica, from New York City to his grandmother Ruth's home in Walkerton, Indiana. Upset about leaving his father, friends, and rabbi behind, Evan becomes determined to make new friends before his upcoming bar mitzvah. He befriends his next-door neighbor Patrice and her friend Archie, who uses a wheelchair, but quickly becomes interested in joining the popular students at his new school.

The popular group is led by football player Brett and cheerleader Kendra, who are attracted to one another. Kendra's best friend Lucy also likes Brett and resents being overshadowed by Kendra. Hoping to gain the group's approval, Evan offers to arrange a movie date for Brett and Kendra. Lucy threatens to convince everyone to boycott Evan's bar mitzvah unless he prevents the pair from kissing.

Evan asks Archie, who has a crush on Kendra, to sit beside her at the theater and interrupt the date. Patrice learns about the plan and tells Kendra's overprotective mother, who arrives and ruins the evening. Brett's friends blame Evan, while Archie and Patrice are angered that he used them. Lucy then kisses Brett and persuades him to become her boyfriend.

As Evan's plans fall apart, he reconciles with Jessica and speaks with his father, who encourages him to admit his mistakes. Evan apologizes to Patrice and Archie and helps Brett repair his relationship with Kendra. Brett breaks up with Lucy, and Lucy later apologizes to Kendra.

On the morning of the bar mitzvah, Patrice decides to forgive Evan and attends the service with Archie and the other students. Evan completes the ceremony, and the group celebrates together at his party. Jessica resumes writing, Evan adjusts to his new home, and the students enter their teenage years with renewed friendships.

== Cast ==
- Eli Golden as Evan Goldman
- Gabriella Uhl as Patrice
- JD McCrary as Brett Sampson
- Lindsey Blackwell as Kendra Duncan
- Frankie McNellis as Lucy Hallman
- Jonathan Lengel as Archie
- Ramon Reed as Eddie
- Nolen Dubuc as Malcolm
- Luke Islam as Carlos
- Shechinah Mpumlwana as Cassie
- Khiyla Aynne as Charlotte
- Willow Moss as Zee
- Kayleigh Cerezo as Molly
- Liam Wignall as KC
- Peter Hermann as Joel Goldman
- Josh Peck as Rabbi Shapiro
- Rhea Perlman as Ruth
- Debra Messing as Jessica Goldman

== Production ==
=== Development ===
On August 12, 2014, CBS Films acquired the rights to adapt 13, with Bert V. Royal hired to write the screenplay and Laurence Mark, Bob Boyett, and David Blackman producing.

In September 2019, Netflix announced that it was developing a new adaptation with Neil Meron producing, Tamra Davis directing, and Robert Horn adapting the musical's book for the screen. Jason Robert Brown was also announced to write new songs for the film. By April 2021, Davis, Brown, Horn, Bob Boyett, and Mark Nicholson were also attached as producers.

=== Casting ===
In October 2020, Meron issued an open casting call for the film's young roles, with performers between the ages of 12 and 16 invited to audition.

In April 2021, Eli Golden, Gabriella Uhl, JD McCrary, Frankie McNellis, Lindsey Blackwell, Jonathan Lengel, Ramon Reed, Nolen Dubuc, Luke Islam, Shechinah Mpumlwana, Kayleigh Cerezo, Willow Moss, Liam Wignall, and Khiyla Aynne were announced as the young ensemble.

Debra Messing joined the cast in May as Evan's mother, a character who remained offstage in the original musical. In June, Rhea Perlman, Josh Peck, and Peter Hermann were cast as Ruth, Rabbi Shapiro, and Joel Goldman, respectively. These characters were newly added or expanded for the film adaptation.

=== Filming ===
The 2020 casting announcement stated that production was expected to begin in Canada in June 2021. Filming locations in Ontario included Beeton's main street and Film.ca Cinemas in Oakville.

== Music ==
Jason Robert Brown wrote three new songs for the film adaptation: "I've Been Waiting", "The Bloodmaster", and "It Would Be Funny". Christopher Lennertz composed the film's incidental score.

The soundtrack was released on August 12, 2022, the same day as the film. Netflix published the following official track listing:

1. "13"
2. "The Lamest Place in the World"
3. "I've Been Waiting"
4. "Opportunity"
5. "The Bloodmaster"
6. "Getting Ready"
7. "Bad Bad News"
8. "It Would Be Funny"
9. "Tell Her"
10. "A Little More Homework"
11. "Brand New You"
12. "Getting Ready (Extended)" (bonus track)
13. "What It Means to Be a Friend" (bonus track)
14. "Tell Her" (bonus track)

== Release ==
13: The Musical premiered at the Paris Theater in New York City on August 8, 2022. Netflix released the film worldwide on August 12.

== Reception ==
On the review aggregator website Rotten Tomatoes, 60% of 20 critics' reviews are positive, with an average rating of 5.7/10. Metacritic, which uses a weighted average, assigned the film a score of 57 out of 100 based on five critics, indicating "mixed or average" reviews.

Noel Murray of the Los Angeles Times wrote that the adaptation felt more like a conventional teen film than the stage production, while praising Brown's songs and the film's middle-school setting. Amy Nicholson of The New York Times praised the young cast and Jamal Sims's choreography. Jesse Hassenger of Paste criticized the adaptation for smoothing away much of the stage musical's distinctiveness.
