= The Vince Staples Show =

2024 American television series

- Release poster
- Genre: Comedy; Surreal comedy; Black comedy; Satire
- Created by: Vince Staples; Ian Edelman; Maurice Williams
- Starring: Vince Staples
- Country of origin: United States
- Original language: English
- No. of seasons: 2
- No. of episodes: 11

Production
- Running time: 19–26 minutes
- Production companies: Khalabo Ink Society; Section Eight Arthouse; Edelgang Worldwide

Original release
- Network: Netflix
- Release: February 15, 2024 – November 6, 2025

The Vince Staples Show is an American comedy television series, created by rapper Vince Staples, alongside Ian Edelman and Maurice Williams for Netflix. The show premiered on February 15, 2024, with five episodes and stars Staples in a satirized African American Long Beach. Andrea Ellsworth, Vanessa Bell Calloway, Beau Billingslea and Naté Jones also appear in recurring roles, and guest appearances on the show include Scott MacArthur, Arturo Castro, Bryan Greenberg, Rick Ross, Matt Oberg, Franz Drameh, Tobie Windham, Megan Danso, Zack Fox, Malcolm Mays, Nelson Franklin, and Teryl Rothery; as well as Bobby V, Brandon Brown and Byron Reeder of the R&B group Mista. The second season premiered on November 6, 2025, with six new episodes.

In January 2026, the series was canceled after two seasons.

== Cast and characters ==
=== Starring ===
- Vince Staples as Vince Staples
  - Christopher Farrar portrays a Teen Vince while Zylen Arnaud appears as 5-year-old Vince ("White Boy")

=== Recurring ===
- Vanessa Bell Calloway as Anita Staples, Vince's mom
- Andrea Ellsworth as Deja (season 1), Vince's girlfriend
- Watts Homie Quan as The Homie (season 1), Vince's childhood friend who is incarcerated and communicates with Vince through phone calls from prison
  - Cedric Joe portrays a Teen Homie ("White Boy")
- Naté Jones as Bri / Brid'gette (season 2, guest season 1), Vince's sister and Anita's daughter
- Beau Billingslea as Uncle James / James Brown (season 2, guest season 1), Vince's uncle and Anita's brother
  - Stiver Hudson portrays a Young Uncle James ("God's Will")

=== Season 1 ===
Episode: Pink House

- Naté Jones as Bri / Brid'gette ("Pink House")
- Scott MacArthur as Officer Boucher ("Pink House")
- Arturo Castro as Officer Gutierrez ("Pink House")
- Bryan Greenberg as Officer Shaw ("Pink House")
- Christopher Meyer as Robb ("Pink House")
- Rafael Castillo as Poke ("Pink House")
- Teddy Lane Jr. as Walter ("Pink House")
- Rashad Hood as He Look Grimey ("Pink House")
- Jeffrey Patneaude as Rival Real Estate Agent ("Pink House") (Patneaude also co-wrote "Anti-Social")
- Hannah Pheng as Tired Worker ("Pink House")
- Jayson Wright as Detective ("Pink House")

Episode: Black Business

- Rick Ross as Rick Ross ("Black Business")
- Myles Bullock as The Bank Robber ("Black Business")
- Matt Oberg as Mr. Hightower ("Black Business")
- Franz Drameh as Timothy ("Black Business")
- Arthur Richardson as Janitor ("Black Business")
- Angela Cristantello as Woman / Secretary ("Black Business")
- Sadie Newman as Lady ("Black Business")
- Tom Sons as SWAT Guy ("Black Business")

Episode: Brown Family

- Beau Billingslea as Uncle James ("Brown Family")
- Deanna Reed-Foster as Janine ("Brown Family")
- Kareem Grimes as Uncle Mike ("Brown Family")
- David Terrell as Uncle Wayne ("Brown Family")
- Cal Gibson as Old Uncle ("Brown Family")
- Monnae Michaell as Gladys ("Brown Family")
- James Earl as Travis ("Brown Family")
- Cassandra Relynn as Sharon ("Brown Family")
- Joi Symone as Tanisha (voice) ("Brown Family")
- Amaury Bubba Newsome as Jaylyn ("Brown Family")
- Staci Lynn Fletcher as Paulette ("Brown Family")

Episode: Red Door

- Tiberius Byrd as Deshaun ("Red Door")
- Pharaoh Singleton as William ("Red Door")
- Jelani Estelle as Kandi and Terra Strong as Kayla ("Red Door")
- Timothy Erin Jones as Chicken George ("Red Door")
- Tyler Yath as Groundskeeper ("Red Door")
- Vincent Stalba as Man Behind the Counter ("Red Door")
- Gene Silvers as Magician ("Red Door")
- Betsy Moore as Caricature Artist ("Red Door")
- Samir Royal as Marcel ("Red Door")
- Giovani Chambers as Jeremy ("Red Door")
- Amari Johnson as Bumper Car Kid ("Red Door")
- Warren Sroka as Lifeguard ("Red Door")
- Keisha Thompson as Mom and Jayden Robertson as Son ("Red Door")
- Oduna Agbongiague as Surf City Photographer ("Red Door")
- Justin Cabanting as Adult Patron ("Red Door")
- Jack Ryan Yuran as Dalmatian Mascot ("Red Door")

Episode: White Boy

- Tiberius Byrd as Deshaun ("White Boy") (previously appeared in "Red Door")
- Patrick Walker as White Boy ("White Boy")
- Idris Keith as Junior ("White Boy")
- Cheyenne Wilbur as The Wise Man ("White Boy")
- Jamald Gardner as Drew Staples AKA Vince's Dad ("White Boy")
- Veronica Bruce as Teacher ("White Boy")
- Mylen Bradford as El Chapo ("White Boy")
- Ryan Diego Shoaf as Jeremiah ("White Boy")
- Jennifer Kim as News Reporter ("White Boy")
- Ted Kim as Kevin Lee ("White Boy")
- Gigi Puana as Leilani ("White Boy")

=== Season 2 ===
Episode: Country Mane

- Jason Sakaki as Emmanuel ("Country Mane")
- Tobie Windham as Milton ("Country Mane")
- Ronald Puno as Slum Baby ("Country Mane")
- Megan Danso as Sam ("Country Mane")
- Kelcey Mawema as Chyna ("Country Mane")
- Quynh Mi as Kurtz Customer ("Country Mane")
- Nevin Burkholder as Lt. Dan ("Country Mane")
- Leo Thomas as MJ Dancer ("Country Mane")
- Liam Raymond Dib as Soirée Attendee ("Country Mane")
- Theresa Coombe as Driver At Grocery Store ("Country Mane")

Episode: Petting Zoo

- Bob Fraser as The Cowboy ("Petting Zoo")
- Benjamin Rogers as The Tweaker ("Petting Zoo")

Episode: God's Will

- Deanna Reed-Foster as Janine ("God's Will") (previously appeared in "Brown Family")
- Kareem Grimes as Uncle Mike ("God's Will") (previously appeared in "Brown Family")
- David Terrell as Uncle Wayne ("God's Will") (previously appeared in "Brown Family")
- Max Montesi as Ian Agasi ("God's Will")
- Emmanuel Akpoviroro as A.C. ("God's Will")
- Beverley Elliott as Dorothy ("God's Will")
- Christina Lewall as Soccer Mom and Ian Lambert as Soccer Son ("God's Will")
- George Boutros and Shane Symons as Home Invaders ("God's Will")
- Caleb Sean Brooks as Baby Vince ("God's Will")
- Brenda Matthews as Donna ("God's Will")

Episode: Anti-Social

- Malcolm Mays as Brother Malcolm ("Anti-Social")
- Whitney Rice as Ruth ("Anti-Social")
- Sam Krochmal as The Valet ("Anti-Social")
- Morgan Derera as Security Guard ("Anti-Social")
- Zack Fox as Zack Fox ("Anti-Social")
- Taylor Bloom as Oscar ("Anti-Social")
- Chyann Victoria as The Partygoer ("Anti-Social")
- Justin Spurr as The Bouncer ("Anti-Social")
- Herschel Andoh as The Gambler ("Anti-Social")
- Shane Dean as The Marine ("Anti-Social")
- Dominic Fox as The Bear / Line Cook ("Anti-Social")
- Andy Thompson as The Bartender ("Anti-Social")
- Corin Clark and Emily Maddison as Concierges ("Anti-Social")
- Masini McDermott and Nyalinglat Latjor as Club Members ("Anti-Social")

Episode: Mr. Baldwin

- Malcolm Mays as Brother Malcolm ("Mr. Baldwin") (previously appeared in "Anti-Social")
- Whitney Rice as Ruth ("Mr. Baldwin") (previously appeared in "Anti-Social")
- Sam Krochmal as The Valet ("Mr. Baldwin") (previously appeared in "Anti-Social")
- Morgan Derera as Security Guard ("Mr. Baldwin") (previously appeared in "Anti-Social")
- Nelson Franklin as House Manager / Massa ("Mr. Baldwin")
- Teryl Rothery as Judge Murphy / Fran Murphy ("Mr. Baldwin")
- Andy Ridings as Bateman ("Mr. Baldwin")
- Gerard Plunkett as Stanley / Stu Stanley ("Mr. Baldwin")
- Dean Paul Gibson as The Tailor / Steve Harvey and Haig Sutherland as The Tailor's Assistant ("Mr. Baldwin")
- Angela Sasso, Jenna Hill, Garth Hodgson and Martin Wilson as Board Members ("Mr. Baldwin")
- Felicity Anne as The Waitress and David Hennessey as The Waiter ("Mr. Baldwin")

Episode: Uncle James is Dead.

- Deanna Reed-Foster as Janine ("Uncle James is Dead.") (previously appeared in "Brown Family" and "God's Will")
- Kareem Grimes as Uncle Mike ("Uncle James is Dead.") (previously appeared in "Brown Family" and "God's Will")
- David Terrell as Uncle Wayne ("Uncle James is Dead.") (previously appeared in "Brown Family" and "God's Will")
- Bobby V, Brandon Brown & Byron Reeder (members of the R&B group Mista) as Singers at Funeral ("Uncle James is Dead.")
- Richard O'Sullivan as The Preacher ("Uncle James is Dead.")
- Brendan Riggs as Marcel ("Uncle James is Dead.")
- Sebastian Kroon as The Gun Salesman ("Uncle James is Dead.")
- Michael Connor as The Organist ("Uncle James is Dead.")
- Adelita Rockhill as The Old Woman ("Uncle James is Dead.")
- Reese Alexander as The Funeral Director ("Uncle James is Dead.")
- Jason Bell, Colby Chartrand and Will Erichson as Club Security #2, #4, and #9 ("Uncle James is Dead.")
- Anita Alfke, Shay Halverson, Breanne Wilson and Sarah Whitney as Crying Blondes ("Uncle James is Dead.")

== Episodes ==
| Season | Episodes | Originally released |
|---|---|---|
| 1 | 5 | February 15, 2024 |
| 2 | 6 | November 6, 2025 |

=== Season 1 (2024) ===
| No. overall | No. in season | Title | Directed by | Written by | Original release date |
|---|---|---|---|---|---|
| 1 | 1 | "Pink House" | William Stefan Smith | Story by : Vince Staples, Ian Edelman & Maurice Williams; Teleplay by : Vince Staples | February 15, 2024 |
After getting pulled over for speeding, Vince lands behind bars and meets an aspiring singer, inquisitive police and a hostile inmate with a grudge.
| 2 | 2 | "Black Business" | Ben Younger | Vince Staples & Amy Hubbs | February 15, 2024 |
When an armed robbery breaks out at the bank where Vince is applying for a small-business loan, he seizes an opportunity to negotiate a lucrative deal.
| 3 | 3 | "Brown Family" | William Stefan Smith | Vince Staples & Crystal Jenkins | February 15, 2024 |
Tensions flare up over macaroni and cheese at a family reunion; as aunties bicker and hard truths emerge, Vince has a heart-to-heart with Uncle James.
| 4 | 4 | "Red Door" | William Stefan Smith | Vince Staples & Winter Coleman | February 15, 2024 |
At a theme park, a mission turns into a misadventure for Vince, who encounters a menacing mascot; Deja gets into a heated argument at the gift shop.
| 5 | 5 | "White Boy" | Ben Younger | Vince Staples | February 15, 2024 |
A run-in with a longtime enemy at Vince's old school escalates into a cat-and-mouse game all over Long Beach.

=== Season 2 (2025) ===
| No. overall | No. in season | Title | Directed by | Written by | Original release date |
|---|---|---|---|---|---|
| 6 | 1 | "Country Mane" | Riley Stearns | Vince Staples | November 6, 2025 |
Vince and Anita's road trip for a family funeral veers off-course when they make an uncomfortable detour at a rental-car agency.
| 7 | 2 | "Petting Zoo" | Riley Stearns | Amy Hubbs | November 6, 2025 |
When Vince tries to intervene in Bri and Anita's ongoing beef, the whole family is left to fight it out at a sketchy roadside pitstop.
| 8 | 3 | "God's Will" | Riley Stearns | Crystal Jenkins | November 6, 2025 |
Stranded at Uncle James' empty mansion after an animated will reading, Vince discovers more than a few skeletons in the closet.
| 9 | 4 | "Anti-Social" | William Stefan Smith | Vince Staples & Jeffrey Patneaude | November 6, 2025 |
Vince makes a delivery to his uncle's elite social club, where the vibes are seriously off and a familiar face doesn't offer much help.
| 10 | 5 | "Mr. Baldwin" | William Stefan Smith | Vince Staples & Amy Hubbs | November 6, 2025 |
Vince tries to turn the tables when he becomes the unwilling guest of honor at a twisted dinner party.
| 11 | 6 | "Uncle James is Dead." | William Stefan Smith | Vince Staples & Crystal Jenkins | November 6, 2025 |
On the day of Uncle James' funeral, Anita and Bri deal with chaos at the church, while Vince hits a few roadblocks on his way to deliver the eulogy.

== Production ==
In 2019, Staples began a YouTube music video series entitled The Vince Staples Show, releasing three episodes which were also released as audio singles: "So What?", "Sheet Music", and "Ad 01: Hell Bound". Staples confirmed in an interview with Vulture that the show was picked up by Netflix between 2019 and 2020 after the YouTube incarnation of the show, but due to the COVID-19 pandemic, was put on hold. The show was inspired by Donald Glover's Atlanta, with Glover helping Staples with the creation.

In an interview with Rolling Stone, Staples reflected on the show's success, saying:

"I'm grateful. I got to do something that isn't really done on that network, or just done in general, with trying to break format and conventional comedy. I'm just trying some new things. So, I'm very happy that people embraced it, and we'll see how they feel about it moving forward. We're still trying to see what's going to happen with that. But, looking forward to other opportunities in the medium."

The show was picked up by Netflix for a second season on May 30, 2024, three months after the premiere of the first season. The second season premiered on November 6, 2025.

On January 21, 2026, Netflix canceled the series after two seasons.

== Reception ==
On Rotten Tomatoes, the series has a score of 94%, based on 16 reviews, with an average rating of 8.5/10. The site's critical consensus reads: "Offbeat and surreal, The Vince Staples Show is a disquietingly hilarious watch that feels like it could've only come straight from its acerbic star's mind." On Metacritic, the series has a score of 77 out of 100, based on reviews from 7 critics, indicating "generally favorable reviews".

Season 1 of The Vince Staples Show was praised from critics for its deadpan, dark, and satirical humor. Other critics complained that the series lacked ingenuity and seemed incomplete and superficial, with one comparing it to an extended music video or YouTube sketch. James Poniewozik of The New York Times said "The Vince Staples Show is an entertaining enigma, and there's something to be said for leaving the people wanting more". Jalyn Smoot of Comic Book Resources said "The Vince Staples Show is a unique watching experience that can't be replicated. It does not belong to a specific genre or fit any cookie-cutter Hollywood tropes". Writing for The A.V. Club, Leila Latif compared its style to Curb Your Enthusiasm. She complimented Vince's deadpan acting and the show's surreal situations.

Season 2 was more linear, though lost some of its surrealism, as put by Debiparna Chakraborty of Outlook. Chakraborty also compared it to Sorry to Bother You. Rolling Out covered audience reviews on social media, which were mostly positive.
