= Isabella Ferreira =

American actress

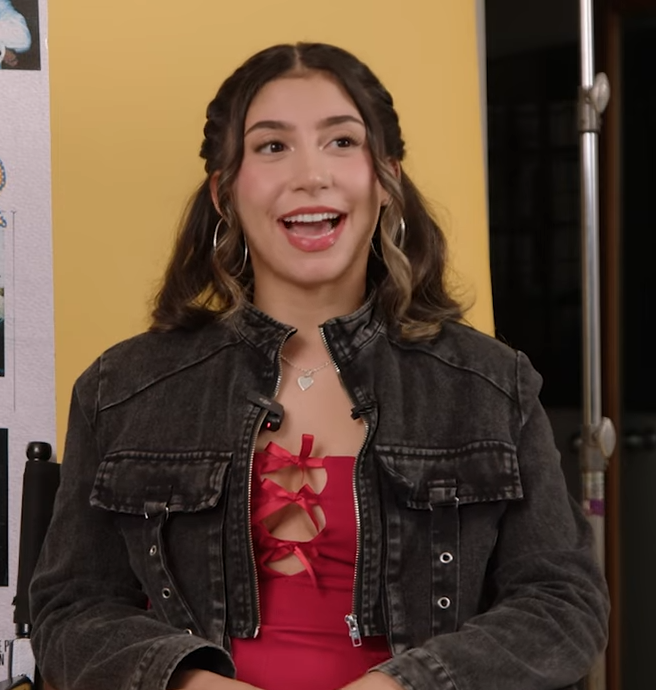
- Ferreira in 2025
- Born: December 20, 2002 (age 23)
- Occupations: Actress; Media personality
- Years active: 2017–present
- Notable work: Gray Matter; Crush
- Television: Love, Victor; Social Distance

Isabella Ferreira (born December 20, 2002) is an American actress known for her work in television and film. She gained prominence as Pilar Salazar in the popular Hulu teen drama series Love, Victor (2020–2022), a spin-off of the 2018 film Love, Simon. Ferreira's portrayal of Pilar, the main character's younger sister, has been praised for its depth and emotional resonance.

== Early life and education ==
Isabella Ferreira was born on December 20, 2002, in Los Angeles, California United States. She was passionate about the performing arts from a young age, particularly in acting and dance. Ferreira pursued her interest in acting through training at various acting Cyber Schools and workshops.

== Career ==
Ferreira's career began with appearances in short films and guest roles on television. Isabella Ferreira made her feature film debut as Olive Tabor in the 2017 film Beyond My Skin, She gained wider recognition when she was cast as Pilar Salazar in Love, Victor, which premiered on Hulu in June 2020. In addition to her work on Love, Victor, Ferreira has appeared in other projects, including guest roles on Orange Is the New Black and roles in independent films.

Isabella Ferreira starred alongside Rowan Blanchard in the Hulu film Crush, which premiered in April 2022. In August 2024, Ferreira also played the character Bailey in Netflix's teen comedy Incoming, directed by Dave Chernin. In 2025, Ferreira appeared in one episode of the second season of the Disney+ supernatural horror series Goosebumps as a younger version of Jen, one of the main characters. The adult version of Jen was played by Ana Ortiz, who played the mother of Ferreira's character on Love, Victor.

== Filmography ==
†	Denotes works that have not yet been released

=== Films ===
Year	Title	Role	Notes
2017	Beyond My Skin	Olive Tabor	Main role
2022	Crush	Gabriela Campos	Supporting
2023	Gray Matter	Calah	Main role
2024	Incoming	Bailey	Main role
2024	Almost Popular	Renee Lalita	Supporting
2025	Shutter Bird	Mia	Main role in short film directed by Réi
2025	No Address	Lauren	Supporting role

=== Television ===
Year	Title	Role	Notes
2016–2017	Orange Is the New Black	Eva Diaz	Recurring Guest Star
2020–2022	Love, Victor	Pilar Salazar	Main role
2020	Social Distance	Madison	Guest Star
2022	Marvel's Wastelanders: Wolverine	Sofia	10 episodes
2022	Show Us Your Pets	Yuna	1 episode
2023	Moonburn	Sara	1 episode
2025	Goosebumps	Young Jen	1 episode
