= Michael Cooper Jr. =

American actor

Michael Cooper Jr
- Born: March 5, 2002 (age 23); Dallas, Texas
- Education: Texas Tech University
- Occupation: Actor
- Years active: 2020–present

Michael Cooper Jr (born March 5, 2002) is an American actor. He has a co-leading role in 2025 Netflix series adaptation of Judy Blume novel Forever.

== Early life ==
He was born and raised in Dallas, Texas and started acting in church plays before getting a part in his school musical, a production of High School Musical, as a sophomore. He studied political science at the University of Texas at Austin and Texas Tech University and graduated from Texas Tech in 2024.

== Career ==
He had early roles in the 2022 horror movie The Inhabitant in which he appeared with Leslie Bibb, and the Paramount+ film adaptation of On the Come Up, based on the book of the same name by author Angie Thomas.

He was cast in a lead role alongside Lovie Simone as Justin Edwards in 2025 the romantic drama television series Forever, an adaptation for Netflix of the novel of the same name by Judy Blume reimagined by producer and screenwriter Mara Brock Akil into the 21st Century Los Angeles. He first auditioned for the role in 2023. His mother was a fan of the book, and he read it after being cast in the series. He described his character as having "one foot in confidence and the other foot in insecurity" and that he thought "there was something so palpable and raw about that. I think it's important because I've never seen a [character like] Justin on screen before. It's important for young boys to really see someone who's able to communicate in that way". He also felt the depiction of a character with ADHD as being important. The series was released on May 8, 2025.

== Partial filmography ==
Year	Title	Role	Notes
2022	The Inhabitant	Carl	
2022	On the Come Up	Malik	
2025	Forever	Justin Edwards	Lead role
