= Incoming (film) =

2024 American teen comedy film

- Release poster
- Directed by: Dave Chernin; John Chernin
- Written by: Dave Chernin; John Chernin
- Produced by: Nicholas Stoller; Conor Welch; Todd Garner; Mark Korshak; Gary Barber; Peter Oillataguerre; Peter Principato; Ben Silverman
- Starring: Mason Thames; Ramon Reed; Raphael Alejandro; Bardia Seiri; Isabella Ferreira; Ali Gallo; Loren Gray; Kaitlin Olson; Bobby Cannavale
- Cinematography: Ricardo Diaz
- Edited by: Elizabeth Praino; Josh Crockett
- Music by: Jonathan Sadoff
- Production companies: Spyglass Media Group; Artists Road; Stoller Global Solutions; Broken Road Productions
- Distributed by: Netflix
- Release date: August 23, 2024
- Running time: 91 minutes
- Country: United States
- Language: English

Incoming is a 2024 American teen comedy film written and directed by Dave Chernin and John Chernin in their feature directorial debuts. It stars Mason Thames, Ramon Reed, Raphael Alejandro, Bardia Seiri, Isabella Ferreira, Ali Gallo, Loren Gray, Kaitlin Olson, and Bobby Cannavale. The film follows four freshmen whose first week of high school culminates in a chaotic party.

Artists Road acquired the project in 2022, and Netflix acquired distribution rights in November 2023. The film was released by Netflix on August 23, 2024, and received generally unfavorable reviews from critics.

== Plot ==
Benj Nielsen begins high school determined to reinvent himself and pursue Bailey, a sophomore who is best friends with his older sister, Alyssa. His friends Eddie and Connor also hope to improve their social standing, while their wealthy friend Danah "Koosh" Koushani wants to live up to the reputation of his popular older brother, Kayvon.

Benj's assigned carpool driver, senior student Ruby, pressures him into helping with a fraudulent drug sale in which vitamins are passed off as MDMA. Koosh later invites the group to Kayvon's back-to-school party. When they arrive, Kayvon permits Koosh to bring only one guest inside. Benj convinces Eddie and Connor to let him stay so that he can spend time with Bailey.

At the party, Benj briefly talks with Bailey and Alyssa before falling in with several older students. Their chemistry teacher, Mr. Studebaker, also arrives and quickly becomes intoxicated. Ruby warns Benj that the skateboarders involved in the fraudulent sale have come looking for him.

Meanwhile, Eddie and Connor take the car belonging to Eddie's mother's boyfriend and drive to the party. An intoxicated senior named Katrina mistakes them for her rideshare drivers and orders them to take her to Taco Bell. She later becomes ill in the back seat, forcing the boys to care for her and clean the car. Although they consider leaving her at a fire station, they decide to keep her safe until she recovers.

At the party, Alyssa's ex-girlfriend confronts her about her habit of criticizing others. Studebaker accidentally sets himself on fire and jumps into the pool. When the skateboarders confront Benj, Ruby blames him for the fake drugs. Kayvon intervenes, but Ruby attacks one of the skateboarders with a cattle prod, beginning a fight. Alyssa's nose is accidentally broken, and Studebaker is shocked by the cattle prod. Benj and Bailey escape the fight and kiss.

Koosh attempts to engineer a romantic encounter with Gabrielle by pretending that they are trapped in the family's indoor spa. Elsewhere, a group of older students pressures Benj into taking a drug that he believes is cocaine but is actually ketamine. Bailey finds him in a dissociative state and leaves in disappointment. Police then break up the party. Koosh slips, injures his shoulder, and later bonds with Alyssa at the hospital. Studebaker attempts to leave but discovers that his car's key fob was destroyed in the fire.

The following morning, Benj confides in Alyssa, who advises him to stop trying to impress Bailey and be himself. Katrina wakes in Eddie's house, initially panics, and then thanks Eddie and Connor for caring for her. Eddie stands up to his mother's boyfriend, while Katrina later defends the boys from bullies at a school pep rally.

Benj publicly sings a Stevie Wonder song to Bailey and asks her out. She rejects him in front of the school but turns back and winks at him as she leaves. Principal Hutchens subsequently fires Studebaker after a video of him partying with students circulates.

== Cast ==
- Mason Thames as Benj Nielsen
- Ramon Reed as Eddie
- Raphael Alejandro as Connor
- Isabella Ferreira as Bailey
- Bardia Seiri as Danah "Koosh" Koushani
- Loren Gray as Katrina Aurienna
- Ali Gallo as Alyssa Nielsen
- Kaitlin Olson as Ms. Nielsen
- Bobby Cannavale as Mr. Studebaker
- Scott MacArthur as Dennis
- Thomas Barbusca as Ruby
- Kim Hawthorne as Principal Hutchens
- Victoria Moroles as Gabrielle
- Kayvan Shai as Kayvon Koushani
- Gattlin Griffith as Shaved Head
- Steele Stebbins as Knucklehead 2
- Devon Weetly as Cool Jeff

== Production ==
=== Development and casting ===
In June 2022, Artists Road acquired the rights to Incoming, with Mason Thames announced in the lead role. Dave Chernin and John Chernin were attached to write and direct the film, marking their feature directorial debuts.

In July 2022, Loren Gray, Bobby Cannavale, Kaitlin Olson, Scott MacArthur, Raphael Alejandro, Ali Gallo, Ramon Reed, Bardia Seiri, and Isabella Ferreira joined the cast.

The producers included Nicholas Stoller and Conor Welch for Stoller Global Solutions, Todd Garner, Peter Principato, Ben Silverman, Mark Korshak, Peter Oillataguerre, and Gary Barber. The production companies were Artists Road, Stoller Global Solutions, Spyglass Media Group, and Broken Road Productions.

In November 2023, Netflix acquired distribution rights to the film. The Chernins said that they developed the story around four freshmen experiencing an early identity crisis during their first high-school party.

== Release ==
Netflix released first-look images in July 2024, followed by the film's trailer later that month. The film was released worldwide on Netflix on August 23, 2024.

== Reception ==
On the review aggregator website Rotten Tomatoes, 25% of 28 critics' reviews are positive, with an average rating of 4/10. Metacritic, which uses a weighted average, assigned the film a score of 38 out of 100 based on eight critics, indicating "generally unfavorable" reviews.

Tomris Laffly of RogerEbert.com gave the film three out of four stars. She praised its willingness to portray its young characters as flawed and singled out the cast, including Thames, Reed, Alejandro, and Seiri. Adrian Horton of The Guardian gave it two out of five stars, criticizing its reliance on gross-out humor and its made-for-streaming appearance, while noting moments of chemistry among the younger cast.
