= Forever (2025 TV series) =

American television series

- Genre: Teen drama
- Created by: Mara Brock Akil
- Inspired by: Forever… by Judy Blume
- Showrunner: Mara Brock Akil
- Starring: Lovie Simone; Michael Cooper Jr.; Xosha Roquemore; Marvin Lawrence Winans III; Wood Harris; Karen Pittman; Malaika Guttoh
- Composer: Gary Gunn
- Country of origin: United States
- Original language: English
- No. of seasons: 1
- No. of episodes: 8

Production
- Executive producers: Judy Blume; Susie Fitzgerald; Erika Harrison; Sara White; Regina King; Shana C. Waterman; Anthony Hemingway
- Producers: Kimberly Ndombe; Amy Libowsky
- Running time: 43–52 minutes
- Production companies: Story 27; Royal Ties Productions

Original release
- Network: Netflix
- Release: May 8, 2025 – present

Forever is an American romantic teen drama television series created by Mara Brock Akil loosely adapted from the Judy Blume novel of the same name. It was released on Netflix on May 8, 2025, and was renewed for a second season on May 14.

== Premise ==
The series is set in 2018 Los Angeles as two young athletes become each other's first love while their families with pushy parents are pressuring them into getting college athletic scholarships.

== Cast and characters ==
=== Main ===
- Lovie Simone as Keisha Clark
- Michael Cooper Jr. as Justin Edwards
- Xosha Roquemore as Shelly, Keisha's mother
- Marvin Lawrence Winans III as Jaden, Justin's younger brother
- Wood Harris as Eric, Justin's father
- Karen Pittman as Dawn, Justin's mother
- Malaika Guttoh as Ameena (season 2)

=== Recurring ===
- Barry Shabaka Henley as George, Keisha's grandfather
- Ali Gallo as Chloe, Keisha's best friend
- Niles Fitch as Darius, Justin's best friend
- Paigion Walker as Tiffany, Keisha's cousin
- Adriyan Rae as Brittany, Keisha's cousin
- E'myri Crutchfield as Tammy, Keisha's track rival
- Xavier Mills as Christian Boykin, Keisha’s ex-boyfriend
- Yusef Thomas as Rodney, Tiffany's partner and a music producer
- Avery Wills Jr. as Jaden (season 2)
- Tre McBride as Elijah (season 2)

== Episodes ==
No.	Title	Directed by	Written by	Original release date
1	"Reunion"	Regina King	Mara Brock Akil	May 8, 2025
2	"Ghosted"	Anthony Hemingway	Erika Harrison	May 8, 2025
3	"Fourth Quarter"	Anthony Hemingway	Kimberly Ndombe	May 8, 2025
4	"Run It Back"	Thembi Banks	Jerron Horton	May 8, 2025
5	"The Vineyard"	Mara Brock Akil	Norman Vance Jr.	May 8, 2025
6	"The Honeymoon"	Thembi Banks	Terrance Daye	May 8, 2025
7	"Deep End"	Anthony Hemingway	Autumn Joy Jimerson	May 8, 2025
8	"Forever..."	Anthony Hemingway	Mara Brock Akil & Danya Hu	May 8, 2025

== Production ==
In November 2022, Netflix announced that it had commissioned a television series adaptation of the book Forever… by Judy Blume, with Mara Brock Akil as showrunner and executive producer and Judy Blume, Susie Fitzgerald, Erika Harrison, Sara White, Regina King, Shana C. Waterman and Anthony Hemingway also as executive producers. King directed the pilot.

The cast is led by Lovie Simone and Michael Cooper Jr and also includes Karen Pittman, Wood Harris, Xosha Roquemore, Marvin Lawrence Winans III, Barry Shabaka Henley, Ali Gallo, Niles Fitch, Paigion Walker and E'myri Crutchfield.

On January 30, 2025, first-look images from filming were released. On May 14, 2025, Netflix renewed the series for a second season. On May 8, 2026, it was reported that filming for the second season had started in Los Angeles and that Malaika Guttoh joined the cast as a series regular while Avery Wills Jr. and Tre McBride were cast in recurring capacities.

== Soundtrack ==
The soundtrack for the show's original score, composed by Gary Gunn, was released by Netflix on May 2, 2025. The soundtrack for the series includes music by Migos, Anderson Paak, Daft Punk, Foam Collective, Travis Scott, SZA, Janelle Monáe, Tyler, The Creator and Childish Gambino amongst others.

== Release and reception ==
The series was released on Netflix on May 8, 2025.

The review aggregator website Rotten Tomatoes reported a 97% approval rating based on 35 critic reviews. The website's critics consensus reads, "A thoroughly modern adaptation of Judy Blume's novel that retains its insight into young love, Forever is an effervescent romance that'll put an everlasting smile on viewers' faces." Metacritic, which uses a weighted average, gave a score of 84 out of 100 based on 16 critics, indicating "universal acclaim".

Kristen Baldwin of Entertainment Weekly gave the series a B+ and said, "While it encompasses all the butterflies and betrayals of first love, Forever also tells a deeper story about the challenges and heartache of raising exceptional Black kids in our fraught modern era."

=== Accolades ===
Award	Year	Category	Nominee(s)	Result	Ref.
Black Reel Awards	2025	Outstanding Drama Series	Forever	Nominated	
Black Reel Awards	2025	Outstanding Lead Performance in a Drama Series	Michael Cooper Jr.	Nominated	
Black Reel Awards	2025	Outstanding Lead Performance in a Drama Series	Lovie Simone	Nominated	
Black Reel Awards	2025	Outstanding Supporting Performance in a Drama Series	Wood Harris	Won	
Black Reel Awards	2025	Outstanding Supporting Performance in a Drama Series	Karen Pittman	Nominated	
Black Reel Awards	2025	Outstanding Guest Performance in a Drama Series	Will Catlett	Nominated	
Black Reel Awards	2025	Outstanding Directing in a Drama Series	Regina King (for episode "Forever...")	Won	
Black Reel Awards	2025	Outstanding Writing in a Drama Series	Mara Brock Akil and Danya Hu (for episode "Forever...")	Nominated	
Black Reel Awards	2025	Outstanding Writing in a Drama Series	Norman Vance Jr. (for episode "The Vineyard")	Nominated	
Black Reel Awards	2025	Outstanding Musical Score	Gary Gunn	Won	
Black Reel Awards	2025	Outstanding Original Song	"Patient" (written by Larry "Price" Jacks, Larrance "Rance 1500" Dopson, and Marcus "Seige Monstracity" White; performed by Larry "Price" Jacks)	Nominated	
Black Reel Awards	2025	Outstanding Original Song	"Tomorrow's Interlude" (written by Halle Burnett, Ben Finkelstein, Max Mendelsohn, Paul Luke Bonenfant, Riley Daggs, and Yasin Akil; performed by Until Tomorrow and Halle Burnett)	Nominated	
Film Independent Spirit Awards	2026	Best New Scripted Series	Mara Brock Akil, Regina King, Susie Fitzgerald, Shana C. Waterman, Reina King, Anthony Hemingway, Judy Blume, Erika Harrison, Sara E. White, Jerron Horton	Nominated	
Film Independent Spirit Awards	2026	Best Lead Performance in a New Scripted Series	Lovie Simone	Nominated	
Film Independent Spirit Awards	2026	Best Supporting Performance in a New Scripted Series	Xosha Roquemore	Nominated	
Film Independent Spirit Awards	2026	Best Breakthrough Performance in a New Scripted Series	Michael Cooper Jr.	Nominated	
NAACP Image Award	2026	Outstanding Drama Series	Forever	Pending	
NAACP Image Award	2026	Outstanding Actor in a Drama Series	Michael Cooper Jr.	Pending	
NAACP Image Award	2026	Outstanding Actress in a Drama Series	Lovie Simone	Pending	
NAACP Image Award	2026	Outstanding Supporting Actor in a Drama Series	Wood Harris	Pending	
NAACP Image Award	2026	Outstanding Supporting Actress in a Drama Series	Karen Pittman	Pending	

== Viewership ==
According to data from Showlabs, Forever ranked first on Netflix in the United States during the week of 12–18 May 2025.
