= Carlie Craig =

American musical comedy writer and performer

Carlie Craig is an American musical comedy writer and performer.

A native of Florida, Craig graduated from the Florida State University College of Fine Arts in 2013. She was a cast member on the 15th season of Mad TV in 2016, known for performing impressions of stars such as Ariana Grande. Other roles including being on the cast of Todrick on MTV in 2015. In 2022, her song "Who The Fuck Was That?" went viral on TikTok.
