= Walk the Prank =

American TV series

- Genre: Comedy
- Created by: Adam Small & Trevor Moore
- Starring: Cody Veith; Bryce Gheisar; Brandon Severs; Jillian Shea Spaeder; Tobie Windham
- Composers: Chris Maxwell; Phil Hernandez
- Country of origin: United States
- Original language: English
- No. of seasons: 3
- No. of episodes: 60 (list of episodes)

Production
- Executive producers: Adam Small; Trevor Moore
- Producer: Skot Bright
- Camera setup: Single camera
- Running time: 20–23 minutes
- Production company: Horizon Productions

Original release
- Network: Disney XD; Disney Channel
- Release: April 1, 2016 – July 16, 2018

Walk the Prank is an American comedy television series created by Adam Small and Trevor Moore that aired on Disney XD from April 1, 2016 to July 16, 2018. The series stars Cody Veith, Bryce Gheisar, Brandon Severs, Jillian Shea Spaeder, and Tobie Windham.

== Premise ==
The show follows four kids—Chance, Herman, Bailey, and Dusty—who pull off elaborate pranks on unsuspecting bystanders, often with the help of Dusty's Uncle Will. Each episode features a blend of scripted scenes, where the characters brainstorm and plan their pranks, followed by the execution of hidden camera pranks on real people who are unaware they are being filmed for a TV show.

== Episodes ==
| Season | Episodes | Originally released | |
| Season | Episodes | First released | Last released |
|---|---|---|---|
| 1 | 20 | April 1, 2016 | November 10, 2016 |
| Special | | March 20, 2017 | |
| 2 | 26 | April 1, 2017 | January 27, 2018 |
| 3 | 13 | April 21, 2018 | July 16, 2018 |

== Cast ==
- Cody Veith as Chance
- Brandon Severs as Dusty
- Bryce Gheisar as Herman
- Jillian Shea Spaeder as Bailey
- Tobie Windham as Will
- Chloe Guidry as J.D.

== Production ==
The show, created by comedians Adam Small and Trevor Moore, was ordered to series by Disney XD in October 2015. On April 1, 2016, the channel aired a sneak peek of the series. On July 28, 2016, Disney XD renewed the series for a second season. On August 31, 2017, the series was renewed for a third season.

== Ratings ==
Viewership and ratings per season of Walk the Prank
| Season | Episodes | First aired | | Last aired | | Avg. viewers (millions) |
| Season | Episodes | Date | Viewers (millions) | Date | Viewers (millions) | Avg. viewers (millions) |
|---|---|---|---|---|---|---|
| 1 | 20 | April 1, 2016 | 0.48 | November 10, 2016 | 1.21 | 1.07 |
| 2 | 20 | April 1, 2017 | 0.27 | January 27, 2018 | 0.22 | 0.21 |
| 3 | 11 | April 21, 2018 | 0.13 | July 16, 2018 | TBD | 0.17 |
