= Benjamin Wadsworth (actor) =

American actor

- Born: Benjamin Hassan Wadsworth; Houston, Texas, U.S.
- Occupation: Actor
- Years active: 2013–present
- Partner(s): Stella Maeve (2019–unknown); Cait Pool (2024-present)
- Children: 1

Benjamin Wadsworth is an American actor. He is best known for playing the lead role of Marcus Lopez Arguello in the Sci-fi series Deadly Class (2018–2019). He also appeared in the series Teen Wolf and the film Unhuman (2022).

== Early life ==
Benjamin Wadsworth was born and grew up in Houston, Texas. He is of Mexican, Iranian, English, Native American, French and Swedish descent. As he began acting by 2013, he was home-schooled during high school in order to enable his film and video work.

== Career ==
Wadsworth became interested in acting, and had a role as Iggy in the comedy web series Dad vs. Lad. He also had some parts in short movies and began to build experience.

In October 2016, he was chosen to play Henry in the pilot for a Let the Right One In series, based on the vampire novel by John Ajvide Lindqvist. However, TNT did not approve the pilot and did not proceed with the series. Later that year, Wadsworth made a special appearance in the final episode of the MTV series Teen Wolf, titled "The Wolves of War", playing Alec.

In November 2017, Wadsworth was chosen to play the lead role of Marcus Lopez in the SyFy television series Deadly Class. He had originally auditioned for another role, but when producers learned he was partially Latino, they invited him to read for Marcus. He was 19 when the series opened in early 2019. He was nominated for the Saturn Award for Best Performance by a Younger Actor in a Television Series for the role. However, the series got discontinued after the first season.

== Personal life ==
On May 10, 2019, Wadsworth became engaged to actress Stella Maeve after a year of dating. Their daughter, Jo Jezebel, was born in January 2020. Wadsworth and Maeve split sometime prior to 2024 as it was announced that year that Wadsworth is in a new relationship with Cait Pool. As of November 2025, Wadsworth and Pool announced their engagement on Instagram.

== Filmography ==
=== Film ===
Year	Title	Role	Notes
2013	Crime Stoppers: Do Something	Student 1	
2014	Pick Your Poison	Sam/Son	
2015	Preydators	Joel Jr.	
2015	Psyn: Pseudo Substances Yielding Necrosis	Cecil / Sam Smith	
2015	Roller Cokesters	Detective	
2018	The Sleeping Dog		
2022	Unhuman	Randall	

=== Television ===
Year	Title	Role	Notes
2013	More Than Human	Alex	Episode: "Destiny Manifested"
2014–2017	Dad vs. Lad	Iggy	Main role
2016	Girl Meets World	Jordan	Episode: "Girl Meets Upstate"
2017	Let the Right One in	Henry	Unaired pilot
2017	Teen Wolf	Alec	Episode: "The Wolves of War"
2018–2019	Deadly Class	Marcus López Arguello	Main role
2019	Celebrity Page	Himself	3 episodes
2019	Collider Heroes	Himself	1 episode
2019	Red Capet Report	Himself	2 episodes
2020	Your Honor	Rocco Baxter	2 episodes
2022–2024	Tell Me Lies	Drew	Main role (season 1); guest (season 2)
2026	Chicago P.D.	Lawrence 'Lolo' Vaughn	Episode: "On The Way"
