= Tobie Windham =

American actor

- Born: 1984 (age 41–42)
- Education: University of Alabama at Birmingham
- Occupation: Actor
- Years active: 2010–present
- Website: tobiewindham.com

Tobie Windham is an American actor. He starred as Will on the Disney XD series Walk the Prank (2016–2018) and Byron on Just Roll with It (2019–2021). In 2023, he played the supporting role of Damian in the HBO dark comedy series Barry.

== Early life ==
Windham was born in Birmingham, Alabama. He was involved in his high school's musical theatre program, and received a scholarship to attend the University of Alabama at Birmingham. He later received his Master of Fine Arts in acting from the American Conservatory Theater. During this time, he spent a month in Italy attending Prima del Teatro. He performed in various festivals, including the Oregon Shakespeare Festival.

== Career ==
Windham made his television debut in 2016 as Uncle Will on the Disney XD hidden-camera prank series Walk the Prank. Following the conclusion of the show's three-season run, creators Adam Small and Trevor Moore developed the Disney Channel series Just Roll With It, on which he portrayed the character Byron.

In 2023, Windham played "Groove Tube" Damian in the fourth season of the HBO series Barry.

== Filmography ==
=== Film ===
Year	Title	Role	Notes
2017	DeKalb Elementary	Agent Armel Parker	Short film
2026	Gail Daughtry and the Celebrity Sex Pass	Terrence	Completed

=== Television ===
Year	Title	Role	Notes
2016–2018	Walk the Prank	Will	Main role
2019–2021	Just Roll with It	Byron	Main role
2023	Party Down	Johnson	Episode: "KSGY-95 Prizewinner's Luau"
2023	Barry	Damian	Recurring role; 6 episodes
2025	Foul Play with Anthony Davis	Program Manager	TBS special
2025	Tires	Mitchell	
2025	The Vince Staples Show	Milton	Episode: "Country Mane"

=== Theatre ===
Year	Title	Role	Venue	Notes
2010	The Brothers Size	Oshooshi Size	Magic Theatre, San Francisco	

== Awards and nominations ==
Year	Award	Category	Nominated work	Result	Ref.
2024	Screen Actors Guild Awards	Outstanding Performance by an Ensemble in a Comedy Series	Barry	Nominated	
