= Lovie Simone =

American actress

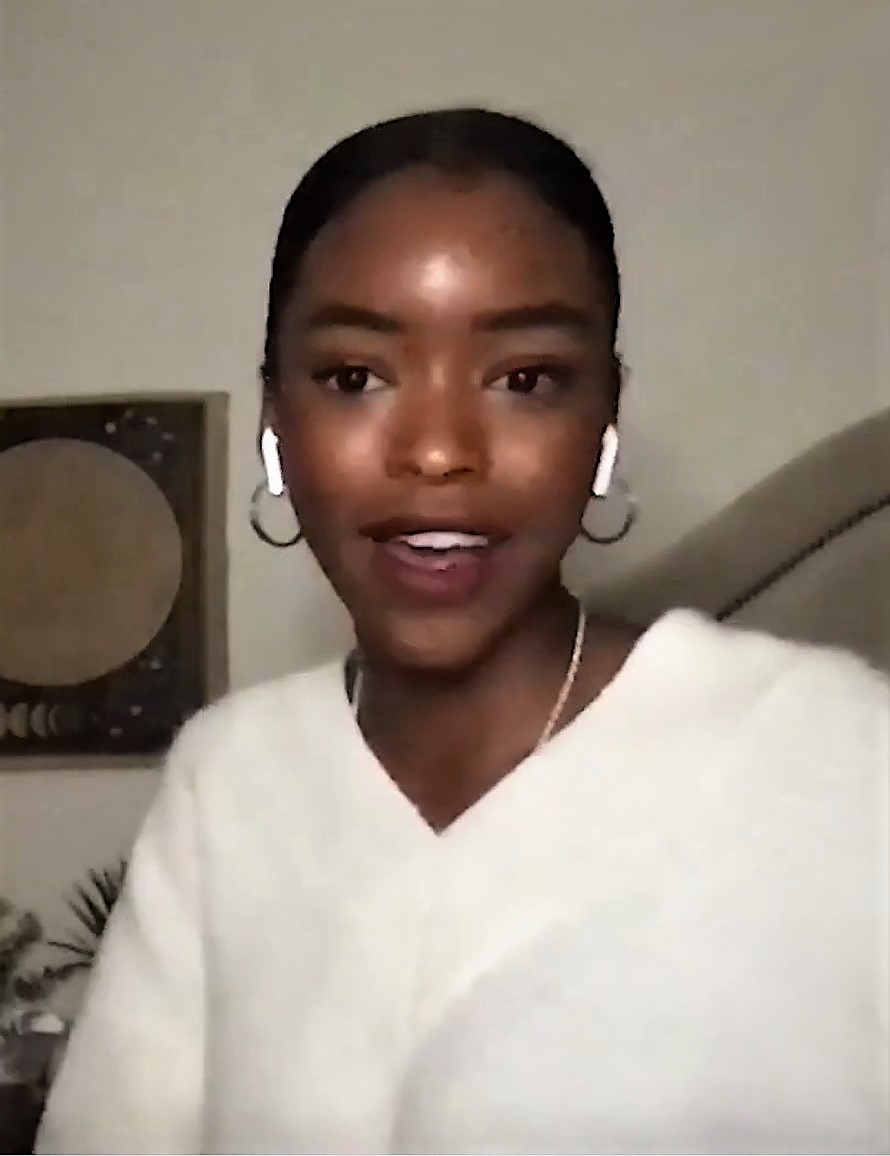
- Simone interviewed in 2020
- Born: Lovie Simone Taylor; November 29, 1998 (age 27); New York City, U.S.
- Occupation: Actress
- Years active: 2009–present

Lovie Simone Taylor (born November 29, 1998) is an American actress, best known for her role as Zora Greenleaf in the drama series Greenleaf (2016–2020), and Keisha Clark in the critically acclaimed Netflix teen drama series Forever (2025).

== Early life and education ==
Simone was born and raised in New York City in The Bronx. Here, she attended Frederick Douglass Academy before moving to Orange County, New York. Here, she attended Monroe-Woodbury High School until graduating in 2016. Her mother is African American and her father is Ghanaian. She has a twin sister named Yori, who's a musician that goes by Reiyo, The Giant and a younger brother and sister. She studied at an acting school in New York and later appeared in a national commercial for JC Penney.

== Career ==
Beginning in 2016, Simone starred in the Oprah Winfrey Network drama series, Greenleaf playing the role of Zora Greenleaf, the daughter of Kerissa (Kim Hawthorne) and Jacob Greenleaf (Lamman Rucker). Simone was originally cast as a recurring cast member, but was promoted to a series regular by the second season. Simone later made her film debut in a supporting role opposite Jennifer Hudson and Kelvin Harrison Jr. in the 2018 drama film Monster, which premiered at the 2018 Sundance Film Festival. The following year, she appeared in two drama films that premiered at the 2019 Sundance Film Festival, Share and Selah and the Spades in which she played the titular role. Both films received positive reviews from critics. In 2020, Simone played one of the leads in writer-director Zoe Lister-Jones' horror film The Craft: Legacy, a sequel to the 1996 film The Craft.

In 2021, Simone starred in the first season of Starz crime drama series, Power Book III: Raising Kanan. In 2022, she was cast opposite Tobias Menzies in the Apple TV+ limited series, Manhunt. She starred in the period drama film The Walk as well as in the 2023 science fiction thriller 57 Seconds. In 2025, she starred as the lead character Keisha Clark in the Netflix teen drama series Forever, which received rave reviews from critics.

== Filmography ==
=== Film ===
Year	Title	Role	Notes
2018	Monster	Renee Pickford	
2019	Share	Jenna	
2019	Selah and the Spades	Selah Summers	
2020	The Craft: Legacy	Tabby	
2022	The Walk	Wendy Robbins	
2023	57 Seconds	Jayla	

=== Television ===
Year	Title	Role	Notes
2016–20	Greenleaf	Zora Greenleaf	Main role, 60 episodes
2017	Orange Is the New Black	Jasmin	1 episode
2017	Blue Bloods	Gina Walker	1 episode
2020	Social Distance	Ayana	1 episode
2021	Power Book III: Raising Kanan	Davina Harrison	Main role, 10 episodes
2024	Manhunt	Mary Simms	Miniseries
2025	Forever	Keisha Clark	Main role
2026	Diarra from Detroit	Lisa	Season 2
