= Jeremy D. Howard =

American actor

- Born: Jeremy D. Howard; Nashville, Tennessee, U.S.
- Occupations: Actor, producer, writer
- Years active: 2013–present

Jeremy D. Howard is an American actor, producer and writer, best known for his work as a cast member on The CW sketch comedy series MADtv in 2016, and for his popular character Sunbrella.

He appeared as an AA sponsor in the Fox TV pilot, The Big Bad Wolfes. He also appeared in an independent comedy film, For the Hits.
