= Elf (film) =

2003 American Christmas fantasy comedy film

- Theatrical release poster
- Directed by: Jon Favreau
- Written by: David Berenbaum
- Produced by: Jon Berg; Todd Komarnicki; Shauna Robertson
- Starring: Will Ferrell; James Caan; Zooey Deschanel; Mary Steenburgen; Ed Asner; Bob Newhart
- Cinematography: Greg Gardiner
- Edited by: Dan Lebental
- Music by: John Debney
- Production company: Guy Walks Into a Bar
- Distributed by: New Line Cinema
- Release date: November 7, 2003
- Running time: 97 minutes
- Country: United States
- Language: English
- Budget: $33 million
- Box office: $232.9 million

Elf is a 2003 American Christmas fantasy comedy film directed by Jon Favreau and written by David Berenbaum. It stars Will Ferrell as Buddy, a human raised by Santa's elves, who learns about his origins and journeys to New York City to meet his biological father. James Caan, Zooey Deschanel, Mary Steenburgen, Ed Asner and Bob Newhart appear in supporting roles.

Elf was released in the United States on November 7, 2003 by New Line Cinema. It became a major critical and commercial success, grossing $232.9 million worldwide against a $33 million budget. Ferrell's performance as Buddy, in particular, was praised by critics. The film inspired the 2010 Broadway musical Elf: The Musical and NBC's 2014 stop motion animated television special Elf: Buddy's Musical Christmas. It has been hailed by many as a modern classic and is often listed as one of the best Christmas films of all time.

== Plot ==
One Christmas Eve, a baby from an orphanage crawls into Santa Claus's sack and is unwittingly taken back to the North Pole. When the infant is discovered at Santa's workshop, the elves name him Buddy, after his diaper's brand label, and Papa Elf adopts him. Growing up, Buddy believes that he is an elf, but discovers in adulthood that he is actually a human. Papa Elf tells Buddy that his birth parents are Walter Hobbs and Susan Wells, the latter having put him up for adoption prior to her death. Walter now works for a publishing company at the Empire State Building in New York City, unaware of Buddy's existence.

Buddy travels to New York and finds Walter at his workplace, but Walter mistakes him for a Christmas-gram messenger and has him ejected. Buddy then visits a Gimbels department store and becomes infatuated with a deadpan employee named Jovie. Hearing that Santa will visit the store the following day, Buddy redecorates the store overnight. However, upon realizing that the store's Santa is a man in a costume, he causes a brawl and gets arrested.

Walter reluctantly bails Buddy out of jail and, after a DNA test confirms that Buddy is his son, takes him home to meet his stepmother Emily and half-brother Michael. Buddy wins Michael over by defeating a gang of bullies in a snowball fight, and Michael helps him to ask Jovie out on a date. Meanwhile, facing pressure from his boss to deliver a successful book by Christmas Eve, Walter arranges a meeting with ghostwriter Miles Finch. The meeting is ruined when Buddy, mistaking Finch for an elf due to his dwarfism, inadvertently offends him and causes him to storm out. Furious at the setback, Walter disowns Buddy, who, heartbroken and ashamed, writes an apology on an Etch A Sketch and prepares to leave the city.

When Michael informs Walter of Buddy's departure, Walter quits his job to look for Buddy. Meanwhile, Buddy meets Santa in Central Park after Santa's sleigh loses its engine and crashes due to waning Christmas spirit. Buddy finds the engine and reunites with Walter and Michael; Walter apologizes for his outburst while Michael reveals the existence of Santa on live television. As Buddy and Santa are chased by Central Park Rangers, Jovie, recalling Buddy's statement that singing can spread Christmas cheer, leads a crowd of people in singing "Santa Claus Is Comin' to Town", generating enough Christmas spirit to power the sleigh without the engine.

By the next Christmas, Walter starts his own independent publishing company, with the first bestseller being a children's book based on Buddy's exploits. Buddy and Jovie, now married and with an infant daughter named Susie, visit Papa Elf at the North Pole.

== Cast ==
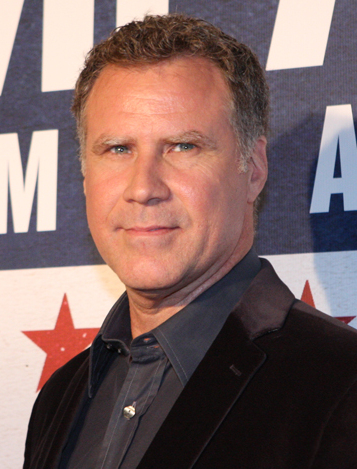
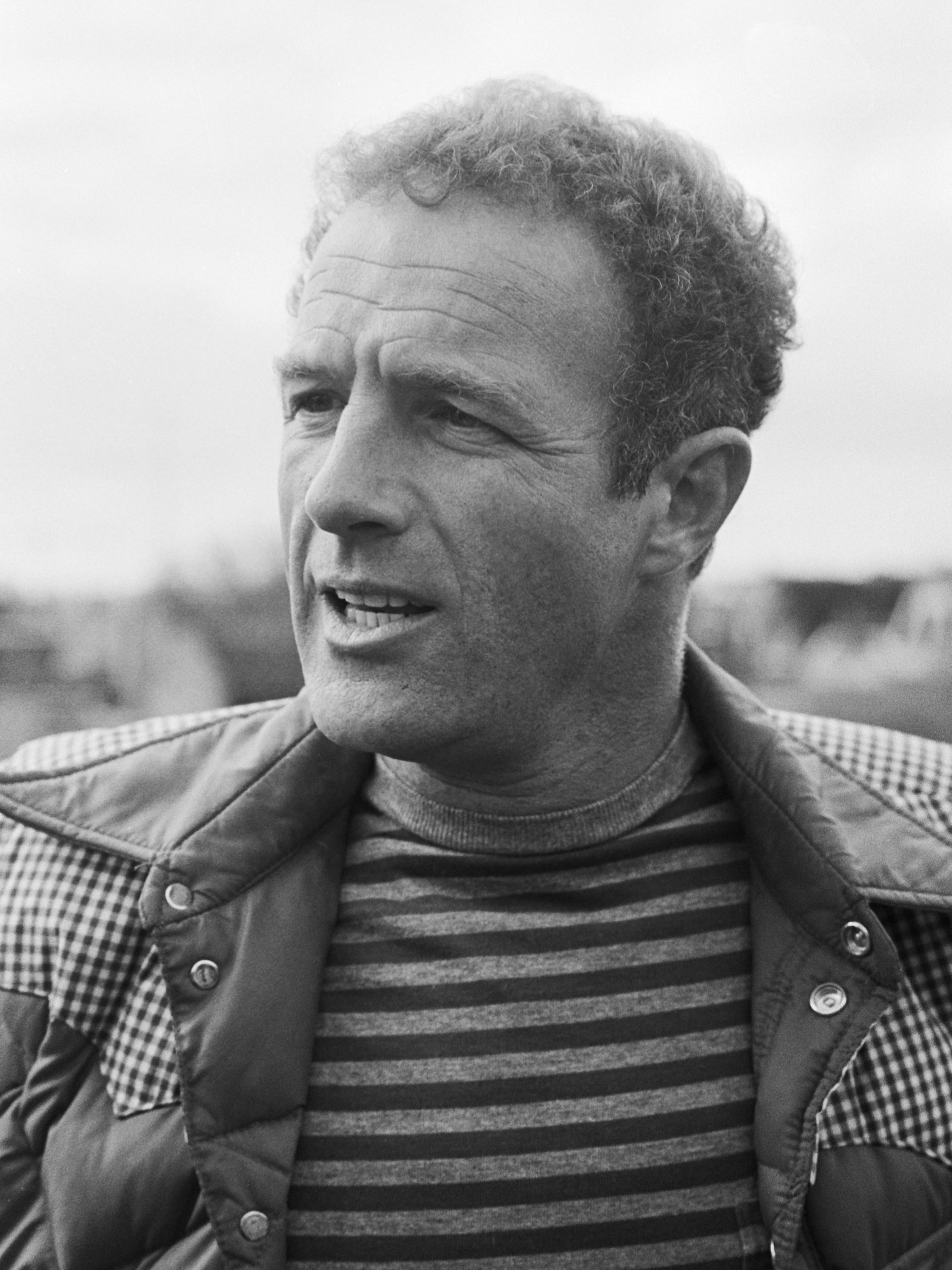
Will Ferrell (left) and James Caan play Buddy and Walter Hobbs respectively.
- Will Ferrell as Buddy Hobbs; an eccentric human who was raised by Santa's elves
  - Max Favreau plays a young Buddy
- James Caan as Walter Hobbs; a cynical children's book publishing executive and Buddy's father
- Bob Newhart as Papa Elf; an older Christmas elf who is Buddy's adoptive father and the film's narrator
- Ed Asner (credited as Edward Asner) as Santa Claus; a Christmas figure who found an infant Buddy in one of his Christmas bags
- Zooey Deschanel as Jovie; an unenthusiastic Gimbels employee and Buddy's love interest.
- Mary Steenburgen as Emily Hobbs; Walter's wife, Buddy's stepmother and Michael's mother; she encourages Walter to bond with Buddy
- Daniel Tay as Michael Hobbs; Walter's and Emily's son and Buddy's half-brother

Faizon Love portrays Wanda, the manager of Gimbels and Jovie's boss. Peter Dinklage portrays children's book author Miles Finch. Amy Sedaris plays Walter's executive assistant, Deb. Michael Lerner portrays Fulton Greenway, the CEO of Greenway Press and Walter's controlling and uncaring boss, as well as the main villain of the film. Andy Richter and Kyle Gass play Walter's two writers Morris and Eugene, respectively.

Artie Lange plays the department store Santa with whom Buddy gets into a fight. Will Ferrell's brother Patrick appears with Patrick McCartney as a pair of Empire State Building security guards. Mark Acheson portrays the mailroom worker who shares his liquor with Buddy. Favreau makes a cameo appearance as Walter's family doctor who does a DNA test on Buddy. Lydia Lawson-Baird portrays Carolyn Reynolds, a little girl whom Buddy meets in the waiting room and has requested a "Suzy Talks-A-Lot" doll for Christmas. Claire Lautier plays Charlotte Denon, an NY1 reporter covering the crash in Central Park, and Matt Walsh appears alongside Lautier as an eyewitness.

At the North Pole, David Paul Grove portrays the elf Pom Pom, on whom Buddy faints, Michael Roberds portrays an elf cobbler, and Richard Side plays an elf teacher. Producer Peter Billingsley is uncredited as head Christmas elf Ming Ming.

Additionally, Leon Redbone voices Leon the Snowman, Ray Harryhausen voices a Polar bear cub, and Favreau is uncredited as the voice of Baby Walrus, Mr. Narwhal and the Arctic Puffin. Also uncredited are Maurice LaMarche for providing Buddy's extended belch, and Dallas McKennon, who provides the voice of the jack-in-the-boxes via archive audio of the hyena he voiced from Disney's Lady and the Tramp.

== Production ==
=== Development ===
David Berenbaum initially wrote the script in 1993, with Chris Farley and Jim Carrey being early candidates to play Buddy. Berenbaum's screenplay underwent uncredited rewrites by Scot Armstrong, Chris Henchy and the writing team of Adam McKay and Will Ferrell, who was also cast to star. Terry Zwigoff was asked to direct the film, but he turned it down in favor of Bad Santa (2003). According to Jon Favreau, the script was initially "much darker" and did not interest him, although he was interested in working with Ferrell's first post-SNL movie. Asked to rewrite it, a turning point came when he realized that he could make Buddy's world an homage to the Rankin/Bass Christmas specials. This allowed him to conceive of a movie that could be rated PG, as opposed to the original script, which he guessed would have been rated PG-13.

Garry Shandling was offered the role of Walter Hobbs, but he declined. Wanda Sykes was originally cast as the Gimbels manager, Wanda, but she dropped out. Faizon Love was then cast in her role and used the nametag that was made for her. Katie Holmes was the first choice for the role of Jovie, but when she turned it down, the role was offered to Zooey Deschanel. Selma Blair was also considered for the role.

=== Filming ===
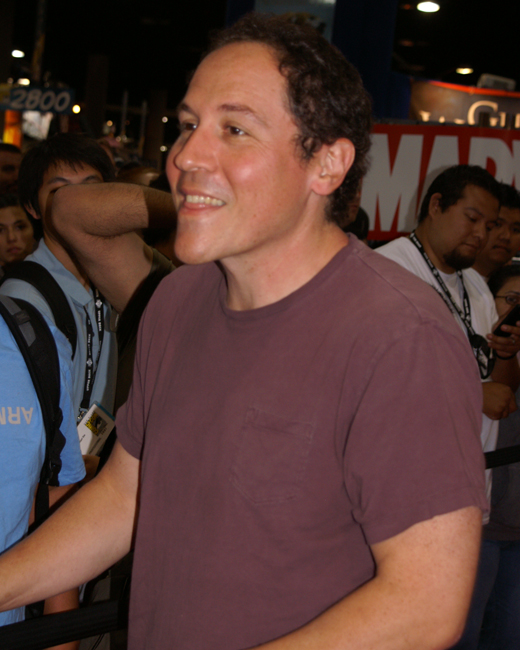
Director Jon Favreau in 2007

Principal photography began on December 9, 2002, and wrapped on March 7, 2003. Filming took place in New York City, as well as in Vancouver and at Riverview Hospital in Coquitlam, Canada.

The film makes heavy use of forced perspective to exaggerate the size of Buddy compared to all the other elves. Stop motion animation was employed for certain sequences. CGI usage was kept to a minimum due to Favreau's own preference, something for which he later noted that he "had to fight very hard".

Ferrell said in interviews that he suffered ill effects after eating the sugary foods that Buddy consumes in the film.

Zooey Deschanel's singing was not in the original script, and Favreau added it when he learned that she was a singer. Ferrell improvised several moments in the film, including the scene in which Buddy starts singing in the middle of Santaland at Gimbels, and the scene in which Buddy screams out "Santa!" when Gimbels' manager, Wanda, announces that Santa is coming to the store.

=== Post-production ===
Apart from snow, most of the computer-generated imagery (CGI) in the film was created by Rhythm & Hues Studios. Buddy's belch after drinking a two-liter bottle of Coca-Cola was dubbed by voice actor Maurice LaMarche.

== Music ==
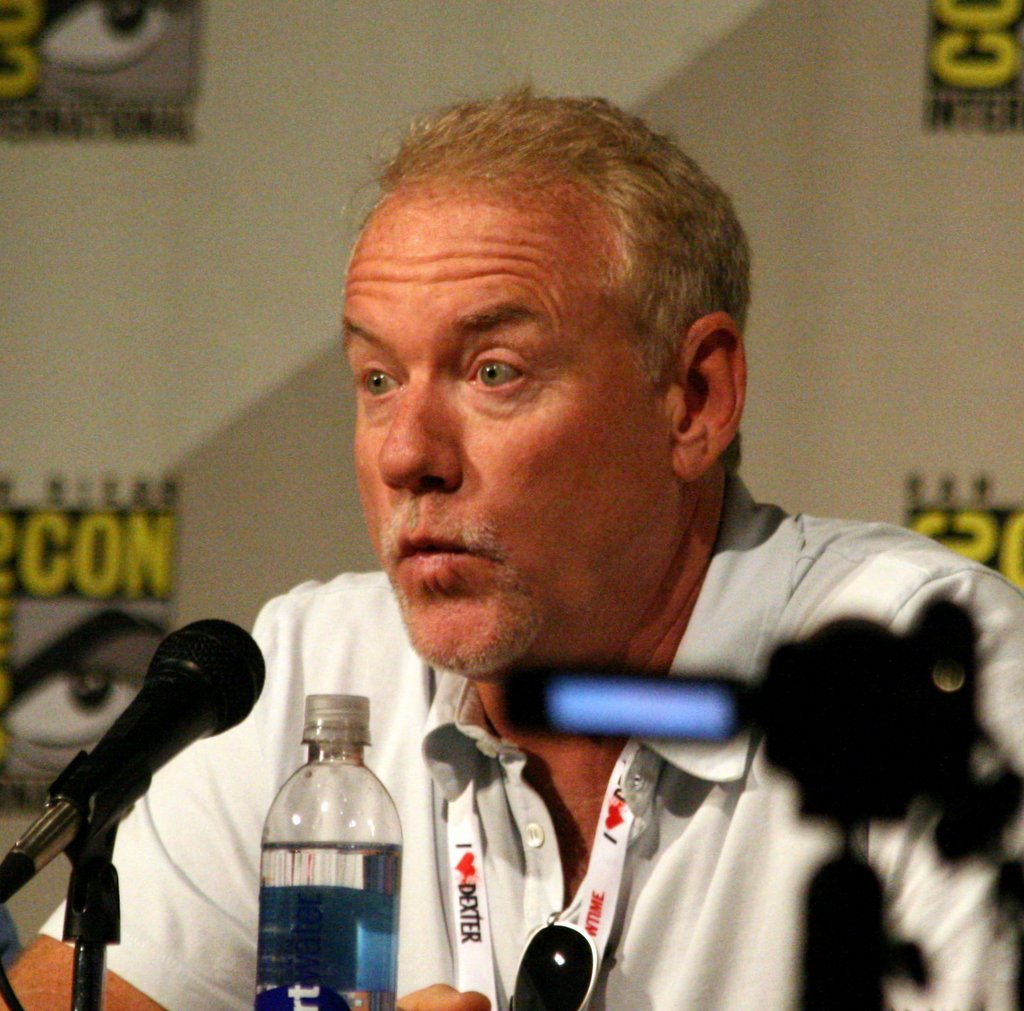
John Debney composed the film's score.

The soundtrack for Elf was released on New Line Records in November 2003 in the United States, and in October 2005 in the United Kingdom, including its signature song "Baby, It's Cold Outside" by Deschanel and Leon Redbone, which was released as a single. It was certified Gold by the RIAA in April 2011. Having sold 695,000 copies in the United States, it is the second-highest-selling soundtrack album for a Christmas-themed film since Nielsen SoundScan started tracking music sales in 1991, behind only The Polar Express.

1. "Pennies from Heaven" – Louis Prima
2. "Sleigh Ride" – Ella Fitzgerald and the Frank De Vol Orchestra
3. "Let It Snow! Let It Snow! Let It Snow!" – Lena Horne
4. "Sleigh Ride/Santa Claus' Party" – Ferrante & Teicher/Les Baxter
5. "Baby, It's Cold Outside" – Leon Redbone and Zooey Deschanel
6. "Jingle Bells" – Jim Reeves
7. "The Nutcracker Suite" – Brian Setzer Orchestra
8. "Christmas Island" – Leon Redbone
9. "Santa Baby" – Eartha Kitt and the Henri René Orchestra
10. "Winter Wonderland" – Ray Charles
11. "Santa Claus Is Comin' to Town" – Eddy Arnold
12. "Nothing from Nothing" – Billy Preston

The score to the film, composed and conducted by John Debney and performed by the Hollywood Studio Symphony, was released by Varèse Sarabande.

== Release ==
=== Home media ===
Elf was released on DVD and VHS on November 16, 2004, and on Blu-ray on October 28, 2008, by New Line Home Entertainment. The film was subsequently released on 4K Blu-ray on November 1, 2022. It is also available for the PlayStation Portable with Universal Media Disc.

== Reception ==
=== Box office ===
Elf grossed $179.8 million in the United States and Canada, and $52.6 million in other territories, for a worldwide total of $232.9 million, against a production budget of $33 million.

The film opened at number two at the box office in the United States with $31.1 million, finishing behind The Matrix Revolutions, also in its first week. It topped the box office in its second week of release, beating out Master and Commander: The Far Side of the World and earning $26.3 million. Additionally, Elf went on to compete against another family-oriented film, Brother Bear. In the United Kingdom, it opened in second place, behind Love Actually. The 2018, 2019 and 2020 reissues earned $442,000, $786,000 and $2 million, respectively.

=== Critical response ===
On Rotten Tomatoes, Elf holds an approval rating of 86%, based on 203 reviews, and an average rating of 7.1/10. The website's critical consensus reads: "A movie full of Yuletide cheer, Elf is a spirited, good-natured family comedy, and it benefits greatly from Will Ferrell's funny and charming performance as one of Santa's biggest helpers." On Metacritic, the film has a weighted average score of 66 out of 100, based on 39 critics, indicating "generally favorable" reviews. Audiences polled by CinemaScore gave the film an average grade of "A−" on a scale of A+ to F.

Roger Ebert of the Chicago Sun-Times gave it three stars out of four, calling it "one of those rare Christmas comedies that has a heart, a brain, and a wicked sense of humor, and it charms the socks right off the mantelpiece".

Writing for Rolling Stone, Peter Travers gave the film two stars out of four, saying, "Ferrell makes the damn thing work. Even though he can't get naked or use naughty words, there's a devil of comedy in Ferrell, and he lets it out to play. Director Jon Favreau has the good sense to just stand out of his way."

Michael Rechtshaffen of The Hollywood Reporter gave the film a positive review, saying, "While the words 'instant holiday classic' might be pushing it, Elf is at the very least a breezily entertaining, perfectly cast family treat."

A. O. Scott of The New York Times also gave the film a positive review, saying, "Elf is a charming, silly family Christmas movie more likely to spread real joy than migraine, indigestion and sugar shock. The movie succeeds because it at once restrains its sticky, gooey good cheer and wildly overdoes it."

Anna Smith of Empire magazine gave the film a three stars out of five, and said, "Ferrell's man-child invites sympathy and sniggers, making this amusing despite some flimsy plotting. Sight gags and a Santa-centered story should keep the kids happy too."

Plugged In gave the film a positive review, writing, "The elf-reared Buddy has a heart as big as the arctic north. Does his movie match it?"

=== Accolades ===
| Year | Award | Category | Recipients | Result | Ref. |
|---|---|---|---|---|---|
| 2004 | ASCAP award | Top Box Office Films | John Debney | Won | |
| 2005 | Golden Satellite Award | Best Youth DVD | | Nominated | |
| 2004 | Golden Trailer | Best Comedy | | Won | |
| 2004 | MTV Movie Award | Best Comedic Performance | Will Ferrell | Nominated | |
| 2004 | Nickelodeon Kids' Choice Award | Favorite Movie | | Nominated | |
| 2004 | Phoenix Film Critics Society Award | Best Live Action Family Film | | Nominated | |
| 2004 | Phoenix Film Critics Society Award | Best Use of Previously Published or Recorded Music | | Nominated | |
| 2004 | Teen Choice Award | Choice Movie Actor – Comedy | Will Ferrell | Nominated | |

=== Critics' rankings ===
Elf is often ranked among the greatest Christmas films, and airs on television mostly during the holiday season. In 2017, Fandango users rated Elf as the best Christmas film of the 21st century.

- Digital Spy – #3
- Total Film – #3
- Entertainment Weekly – #4
- San Francisco Chronicle – #4
- The Guardian – #4
- GamesRadar+ - #5
- The Hollywood Reporter – #6
- Forbes – #7
- Newsday – #7
- about.com – #9
- Empire – #11
- Chicago Tribune – #17
- New York Daily News – #23

== Other media ==
=== Musical ===
A Broadway musical based on the film ran on Broadway during the 2010 Christmas season. It was directed by Casey Nicholaw, with music by Matthew Sklar, lyrics by Chad Beguelin, and a book by Bob Martin and Thomas Meehan.

The musical officially opened at the Al Hirschfeld Theatre on November 10, 2010, after previews from November 2, 2010. The cast included Sebastian Arcelus as Buddy, Amy Spanger as Jovie, Beth Leavel as Emily, Mark Jacoby as Walter, Matthew Gumley as Michael, Valerie Wright as Deb, Michael McCormick as Mr. Greenway, Michael Mandell as Store Manager and George Wendt as Santa. It ran through January 2, 2011.

=== Animated special ===
Elf: Buddy's Musical Christmas is an hour-long stop-motion animated musical television special based on the film and the musical. While Ed Asner is the only cast member from the film to reprise his role, the rest of the cast includes Jim Parsons as Buddy, Mark Hamill as Walter Hobbs, Kate Micucci as Jovie, Rachael MacFarlane as Emily Hobbs, Max Charles as Michael Hobbs and Gilbert Gottfried as Mr. Greenway. It was produced by Warner Bros. Animation and first aired on NBC on December 16, 2014, and features songs from the musical. It also aired on Cartoon Network.

=== Video game ===
A video game based on the film was released on November 4, 2004, for the Game Boy Advance, developed by Jolliford Management Limited and published by Crave Entertainment. The game cover reads "Elf the Movie", yet Crave Entertainment listed it on their website as "Elf". The game follows the same plot as the movie. In the majority of the levels, the player has to collect candies throughout each level while avoiding various objects and polar bears. Several levels consist of minigames, such as flying Santa's sleigh or engaging in a snowball fight. The game received generally negative reviews.

=== Cancelled sequel ===
On September 18, 2013, Mental Floss reported that Favreau was interested in making a sequel to the film, titled Elf 2: Buddy Saves Christmas. In December, Ferrell stated that he did not want to make a sequel. In January 2016, though Favreau stated that a sequel was still possible, Ferrell reiterated in the following month that the sequel was unlikely and stated that he was generally reluctant to do sequels unless there was a story that justifies it. On September 18, 2020, Caan affirmed that the possibility of a sequel was unlikely, stating that Ferrell and Favreau did not get along. On February 13, 2023, Favreau stated that he was no longer interested in making a sequel to the film, saying, "That particular film, I don't know what story would be told after that. It's very complete."

In November 2026, Andy Richter mentioned that writer Scot Armstrong had written a script for a sequel involving “the evil South Pole elves kidnapping Santa or something like that,” but that the project eventually died. Additionally, Richter stated that The Edge had also written a script for a sequel and wanted to discuss it with producer Shauna Robertson. According to Richter, the meeting never happened, stating that “it just petered out and never happened.”

== See also ==
- List of Christmas films
- Santa Claus in film
