= The Prom (film) =

2020 musical film directed by Ryan Murphy

- Official release poster
- Directed by: Ryan Murphy
- Screenplay by: Bob Martin; Chad Beguelin
- Based on: The Prom by: Chad Beguelin; Bob Martin; Matthew Sklar
- Produced by: Ryan Murphy; Alexis Martin Woodall; Adam Anders; Dori Berinstein; Bill Damaschke
- Starring: Meryl Streep; James Corden; Nicole Kidman; Keegan-Michael Key; Andrew Rannells; Jo Ellen Pellman; Ariana DeBose; Tracey Ullman; Kevin Chamberlin; Mary Kay Place; Kerry Washington
- Cinematography: Matthew Libatique
- Edited by: Peggy Tachdjian; Danielle Wang
- Music by: Matthew Sklar; David Klotz
- Production company: Ryan Murphy Productions
- Distributed by: Netflix
- Release date: December 11, 2020
- Running time: 131 minutes
- Country: United States
- Language: English
- Box office: $187,430

The Prom is a 2020 American musical comedy film directed by Ryan Murphy from a screenplay by Chad Beguelin and Bob Martin, based on the 2018 Broadway musical of the same name by Martin, Beguelin, and Matthew Sklar. The film stars Meryl Streep, James Corden, Nicole Kidman, Keegan-Michael Key, Andrew Rannells, Ariana DeBose, Tracey Ullman, Kevin Chamberlin, Mary Kay Place, Kerry Washington, and introducing Jo Ellen Pellman in her film debut as Emma Nolan, with Logan Riley Hassel, Sofia Deler, Nico Greetham, and Nathaniel J. Potvin in supporting roles.

The announcement that a film adaptation of The Prom was in development was made in April 2019, with Murphy confirmed as director, as well as serving as a co-producer along with Alexis Martin Woodall, Adam Anders, Dori Berinstein, and former DreamWorks Animation chief creative officer Bill Damaschke. Beguelin and Martin adapted their book into a screenplay, with Beguelin working with Sklar to rework songs from the musical for the film. Additionally, Sklar also composed the film's incidental score with David Klotz, while Murphy, Anders, and Peer Åström served as music producers. Casting, which began in June 2019, included Pellman, Streep, Corden, Kidman, Key, DeBose, Hassel, Deler, Greetham, Potvin, Rannells, Ullman, Chamberlin, Place, and Washington. Principal photography began in December 2019, but was briefly suspended in March 2020 due to COVID-19, before resuming that July.

The Prom had a limited theatrical release on December 4, 2020, prior to streaming on Netflix on December 11. The film received mixed reviews by critics, who praised the message, musical numbers and ensemble cast, but criticized the narrative, the appearance of some stereotypes, and the film's editing, as well as Corden's performance.

== Plot ==
In Edgewater, Indiana, James Madison High School's head of the PTA, Mrs. Greene, announces the cancellation of prom because lesbian student Emma Nolan planned to attend with her girlfriend Alyssa, Mrs. Greene's closeted daughter. Principal Tom Hawkins supports Emma, but is powerless against the PTA's decision.

Broadway stars Dee Dee Allen and Barry Glickman are disappointed after their show Eleanor! The Eleanor Roosevelt Story closes on opening night following a negative review by The New York Times. They are comforted by Trent Oliver, a faded sitcom star reduced to forgettable theatre work, and Angie Dickinson, who just quit the chorus line of Chicago after being passed over for the role of Roxie Hart. Barry realizes they all need a cause to revitalize their careers. Finding Emma's story on Twitter inspires the actors to drive to Indiana with the non-Equity touring cast of Godspell and publicist Sheldon Saperstein.

Emma is bullied and harassed at school by Kaylee, Shelby, Nick and Kevin, who blame her for ruining prom. The actors barge into the next PTA meeting and attempt to rally support for Emma. Principal Hawkins, a fan of Dee Dee's, fails to convince her to back off. The actors book themselves as entertainment for a monster truck rally, but are booed off the stage for preaching about acceptance. Hawkins tells them the Indiana Supreme Court has ruled the school must allow Emma to attend prom and later bonds with Dee Dee over dinner.

On promposal day, Barry visits Emma at her grandmother Bea's where she's been living since her sixteenth birthday, after her parents threw her out for being gay. Barry tells Emma he ran away from home at sixteen because he knew his parents wouldn't accept his sexual orientation.

The PTA exploits a loophole in the Court's ruling by arranging a separate prom for Emma to attend alone while hosting the rest of the students at a private club. Emma calls Alyssa for support, however she is too scared of losing her mother to come out. Hawkins is disgusted when he learns the real reason that Dee Dee came to Indiana was to use Emma to prop up her career.

Mrs. Greene holds a press conference about the two proms. Angie comforts a heartbroken Emma. When Barry persuades Dee Dee to get Emma on her ex-husband Eddie Sharp's talk show, she insists that he call his estranged mother Vera and make peace. Dee Dee apologizes to Hawkins for lying to him and they reconcile. Emma, upset that Alyssa won't stand up to her mother, breaks up with her.

Trent confronts Emma's tormentors, persuading them to support her with help from the Godspell cast. Dee Dee arrives at the motel and announces she traded Eddie her house in The Hamptons for Emma's slot on his show but Emma turns the offer down to tell her story her own way. She sings a song she wrote during a livestream, which goes viral.

The actors pool their finances to throw an all-inclusive prom for Emma. Afterward, Dee Dee tells Barry she called Vera, who wants to talk to him. Vera apologizes to Barry for her past treatment of him, so they make peace.

Kaylee, Shelby, Nick and Kevin apologize to Alyssa and Emma for their behavior. Mrs. Greene tries to stop their preparations for the prom. When Alyssa reveals who she really is, her mother leaves. Alyssa and Emma reconcile.

Emma and Alyssa arrive early to meet with the actors, Sheldon, Bea, and Vera. Angie learns that she has been cast as Roxie Hart as Tina Louise has contracted shingles, Trent retires from acting to become the school's new drama teacher, and Barry is crowned prom king. The students and many teens from the local LGBT community show up to the prom in support of Emma. As the event begins, Mrs. Greene apologizes, and embraces Alyssa, accepting her for who she is. Dee Dee and Principal Hawkins kiss and start a relationship. Emma and Alyssa share their first public kiss as everyone celebrates.

== Cast ==
- Meryl Streep as Dee Dee Allen, a narcissistic two-time Tony award-winning Broadway actress.
- James Corden as Barry Glickman, a narcissistic Broadway actor.
  - Sam Pillow as a young Barry Glickman
- Nicole Kidman as Angie Dickinson, a chorus girl who craves the chance to be Roxie Hart in Chicago.
- Keegan-Michael Key as Tom Hawkins, the principal of James Madison High School.
- Andrew Rannells as Trent Oliver, a Juilliard graduate who is between gigs and starred in the sitcom Talk to the Hand.
- Jo Ellen Pellman as Emma Nolan, a lesbian 17-year-old girl.
- Ariana DeBose as Alyssa Greene, a cheerleader who is Emma's closeted girlfriend.
- Kerry Washington as Mrs. Greene, Alyssa's mother and the head of Edgewater's PTA.
- Tracey Ullman as Vera Glickman, Barry's mother.
- Kevin Chamberlin as Sheldon Saperstein, Dee Dee and Barry's publicist.
- Mary Kay Place as Grandma Bea, Emma's supportive grandmother who raised her when Emma's parents kicked her out of their house for being gay.
- Logan Riley Hassel as Kaylee, Alyssa's cheerleader friend who disapproves of Emma taking a girl to prom and has a small tattoo on her wrist.
- Sofia Deler as Shelby, Alyssa and Kaylee's cheerleader friend who also disapproves of Emma taking a girl to prom and has lost her virginity.
- Nico Greetham as Nick, Kaylee's boyfriend whose parents are divorced.
- Nathaniel J. Potvin as Kevin Shield, Shelby's boyfriend.

== Soundtrack ==
The Prom (Music from the Netflix Film)

Soundtrack album by Matthew Sklar, Chad Beguelin, Adam Anders, and Peer Astrom
- Released: December 4, 2020
- Genre: Soundtrack
- Length: 1:00:44
- Label: Maisie Music

Singles from The Prom (Music from the Netflix Film)
- 1. "Tonight Belongs to You" Released: November 20, 2020; 2. "Wear Your Crown" Released: November 20, 2020

The soundtrack was released digitally on December 4, 2020, by Maisie Music, with a physical release on December 18.

All tracks are written by Matthew Sklar and Chad Beguelin, except where indicated.

Track listing
| No. | Title | Writer(s) | Performer(s) | Length |
|---|---|---|---|---|
| 1. | "Changing Lives" | | Meryl Streep, James Corden and Ensemble | 3:09 |
| 2. | "Changing Lives (Reprise)" | | Streep, Corden, Nicole Kidman and Andrew Rannells | 1:54 |
| 3. | "Just Breathe" | | Jo Ellen Pellman | 2:54 |
| 4. | "It's Not About Me" | | Streep, Corden, Kidman, Rannells, Keegan-Michael Key, Kerry Washington and Ensemble | 3:59 |
| 5. | "Dance with You" | | Pellman and Ariana DeBose | 2:35 |
| 6. | "The Acceptance Song" | | Rannells and Ensemble | 3:22 |
| 7. | "You Happened" | | Pellman, DeBose, Nathaniel J. Potvin, Nico Greetham and Ensemble | 3:11 |
| 8. | "We Look to You" | | Key | 2:49 |
| 9. | "Tonight Belongs to You" | | Cast | 5:26 |
| 10. | "Tonight Belongs to You (Reprise)" | | Pellman | 0:43 |
| 11. | "Zazz" | | Kidman and Pellman | 3:08 |
| 12. | "The Lady's Improving" | | Streep | 2:39 |
| 13. | "Alyssa Greene" | | DeBose | 2:20 |
| 14. | "Love Thy Neighbor" | | Rannells, Sofia Deler, Potvin, Greetham, Logan Riley and Ensemble | 4:31 |
| 15. | "Barry Is Going to Prom" | | Corden | 2:35 |
| 16. | "Unruly Heart" | | Pellman and Ensemble | 3:59 |
| 17. | "It's Time to Dance" | | Pellman, DeBose, Corden, Streep, Rannells, Kidman, Key, Kevin Chamberlin and Ensemble | 5:05 |
| 18. | "Wear Your Crown" (end credits) | Sklar, Beguelin, Adam Anders, Peer Åström | DeBose, Pellman, Washington, Kidman and Streep | 3:05 |
| 19. | "Simply Love" (end credits) | Anders, Beguelin, Sklar | Corden | 2:50 |
| Total length: | | | | 1:00:44 |

== Production ==
The film is based on the same premise as the musical of the same name, that uses music by Matthew Sklar, lyrics by Chad Beguelin, and a book by Bob Martin and Beguelin, based on an original concept by Jack Viertel. The film is also loosely based around the 2010 Itawamba County School District prom controversy.

CNN notes the film project is on "theme with Murphy's advocacy for more inclusivity in Hollywood" including his spearheading the 2017 Half Initiative, to "create equal representation for women and minorities behind the camera". Murphy announced plans for the adaptation during a charity performance of the musical at New York's Longacre Theatre in April 2019.

On June 25, 2019, Meryl Streep, James Corden, Andrew Rannells and Nicole Kidman were revealed to be cast as the four leads, with Keegan-Michael Key as the school principal. Ariana Grande was initially cast as Alyssa Greene, a popular but closeted cheerleader and Emma's girlfriend, but scheduling conflicts with the Sweetener World Tour forced Grande to drop out. Kerry Washington was cast in October, with Ariana DeBose joining in November, replacing Grande in the role of Alyssa. Jo Ellen Pellman was also cast as Emma following a nationwide search. Madelaine Petsch also auditioned for Pellman's role. The project is the first film under Murphy's $300 million deal with Netflix, and fifth overall. On January 25, 2020, Awkwafina dropped out of the film due to scheduling conflicts and Kevin Chamberlin was recast as Sheldon Saperstein. On June 25, 2020, it was revealed that Tracey Ullman and Mary Kay Place were also part of the cast. Casey Nicholaw, who directed and choreographed the Broadway production, choreographed the film's dance numbers.

Filming commenced on December 11, 2019, in Los Angeles. On March 12, 2020, production was suspended due to the COVID-19 pandemic. Prior to this, the leads had wrapped filming, with only two days of second unit filming left, which was initially scheduled to resume in mid-April, but was ultimately delayed to summer. Production resumed on July 23, 2020.

== Release ==
The Prom had an awards-qualifying limited theatrical release on December 4, 2020, before being released digitally on December 11 by Netflix. It was the second-most watched film over its first weekend on the platform, before falling to tenth in its second week.

== Reception ==
On review aggregator Rotten Tomatoes, the film has an approval rating of 54% based on 203 reviews, with an average rating of 5.8/10. The website's critics consensus reads: "Through fiery songs and dance breaks, The Prom's bonanza of glitz, glitter, and jazz hands might be enough to whisk audiences away." On Metacritic, the film has a weighted average score of 55 out of 100, based on 35 critics, indicating "mixed or average reviews".

Peter Bradshaw of The Guardian gave the film four out of five stars, writing that it is "so goofy that you just have to enjoy it". He went on to praise the musical numbers and the film's message of self-love. Brian Truitt of USA Today also gave the film four stars out of four, calling it a "joyous adaptation". In AfterEllen, Claire Heuchan described the film as "a sweet homage to all the young lesbians and gays finding the courage to live and love authentically." In his review for The Hollywood Reporter, David Rooney noted that "there's something to be said for the wide reach of a Netflix feature that champions the rights of LGBTQ teens, sharing a message that's easy to endorse even if the delivery tends to grate."

Of the opposing opinion, Mary Sollosi of Entertainment Weekly gave the film a "D" grade calling it "narratively sloppy, emotionally false, visually ugly, morally superior, and at least 15 minutes too long". Jesse Hassenger of The A.V. Club gave the film a "D+" describing it as "all-star, feel-good, zazzy nonsense".

James Corden's performance was criticized as offensive by some; Corden himself is straight while the character is gay and some said his performance perpetuated, and capitalized on, stereotypes of gay men. Regarding his depiction of a flamboyant gay man, David Rooney wrote that "perhaps aware of the potential minefield for a straight actor playing a flaming gay stereotype, Corden channels the mannerisms without the joy."

== Accolades ==
| Award | Date of ceremony | Category | Recipient(s) | Result | Ref. |
|---|---|---|---|---|---|
| Art Directors Guild Awards | April 10, 2021 | Excellence in Production Design for a Contemporary Film | Jamie Walker McCall | Nominated | |
| Costume Designers Guild Awards | April 13, 2021 | Excellence in Contemporary Film | Lou Eyrich | Nominated | |
| GLAAD Media Awards | April 8, 2021 | Outstanding Film – Wide Release | The Prom | Nominated | |
| Golden Globe Awards | February 28, 2021 | Best Motion Picture – Musical or Comedy | The Prom | Nominated | |
| Golden Globe Awards | February 28, 2021 | Best Actor in a Motion Picture – Musical or Comedy | James Corden | Nominated | |
| Make-Up Artists and Hair Stylists Guild Awards | April 3, 2021 | Best Contemporary Make-Up | Eryn Krueger Mekash, J. Roy Helland, Kyra Panchenko and Donald McInnes | Nominated | |
| Make-Up Artists and Hair Stylists Guild Awards | April 3, 2021 | Best Contemporary Hair Styling | Chris Clark, Natalie Driscoll, Ka’Maura Eley and J. Roy Helland | Nominated | |
| Motion Picture Sound Editors Awards | April 16, 2021 | Outstanding Achievement in Sound Editing – Musical for Feature Film | Nick Baxter and David Klotz | Nominated | |
| Satellite Awards | February 15, 2021 | Best Actress in a Motion Picture – Comedy or Musical | Meryl Streep | Nominated | |
| Satellite Awards | February 15, 2021 | Best Supporting Actress – Motion Picture | Nicole Kidman | Nominated | |
| Satellite Awards | February 15, 2021 | Best Art Direction and Production Design | Jamie Walker McCall and Gene Serdena | Nominated | |
| Satellite Awards | February 15, 2021 | Best Sound (Editing and Mixing) | Gary Megregian, David Giammarco, Mark Paterson and Steven A. Morrow | Nominated | |
| Set Decorators Society of America Awards | March 31, 2021 | Best Achievement in Décor/Design of a Comedy or Musical Feature Film | Gene Serdena and Jamie Walker McCall | Won | |
