= The Prom (musical) =

American Broadway musical

- Original Broadway Poster
- Music: Matthew Sklar
- Lyrics: Chad Beguelin
- Book: Bob Martin; Chad Beguelin
- Basis: Original concept by Jack Viertel
- Premiere: August 18, 2016: Alliance Theatre, Atlanta
- Productions: 2016 Atlanta; 2018 Broadway; 2021 US tour 2022 Mexico City; 2026 Australia
- Awards: Drama Desk Award for Outstanding Musical

The Prom is a musical with music by Matthew Sklar, lyrics by Chad Beguelin, and a book by Bob Martin and Beguelin, based on an original concept by Jack Viertel. The musical follows four Broadway actors lamenting their days of fame, as they travel to the conservative town of Edgewater, Indiana, to help a lesbian student banned from bringing her girlfriend to high school prom.

The musical had a tryout at the Alliance Theatre in Atlanta, Georgia, in 2016 and premiered on Broadway at the Longacre Theatre in October 2018.

A film adaptation, starring Meryl Streep and James Corden, and produced/directed by Ryan Murphy, was released on Netflix on December 11, 2020.

== Background ==
In 2010, Constance McMillen was a senior at Itawamba Agricultural High School in Fulton, Mississippi. She had plans to bring her girlfriend to their senior prom and wear a tuxedo, and in response, was banned from attending by the school board. McMillen challenged the board's decision; in response, the board decided to entirely cancel that year's senior prom. McMillen and the ACLU sued her school district, and a federal court found the Itawamba School District guilty of violating McMillen's First Amendment rights. However, the judge did not force the school district to reinstate the prom.

The board did eventually allow McMillen to attend prom, but the event, held at a local country club, was attended by only seven students. Local parents quietly organized a separate prom for the rest of the students, making sure to keep the location secret to avoid media attention.

Celebrities—such as Green Day, Cat Cora, and Lance Bass—rallied together via social media to show their support for McMillen and agreed to help sponsor a "Second-Chance" prom, where McMillen and her girlfriend could attend without homophobic backlash.

== Productions ==
=== Atlanta (2016) ===
The show played the Alliance Theatre in Atlanta from August 18 to September 25, 2016. Casey Nicholaw was director and choreographer, with set design by Scott Pask, costumes by Ann Roth and Matthew Pachtman, lighting by Kenneth Posner and sound by Peter Hylenski.

=== Broadway (2018) ===
The show began previews at the Longacre Theatre on October 23, 2018, with an official opening on November 16, 2018. The production closed on August 11, 2019, having played 24 previews and 310 regular performances. The production cost $13.5 million to stage and did not recoup its investment.

=== U.S. tour (2021) ===
A national tour of The Prom was expected to begin February 2021 in Providence, Rhode Island. It was delayed due to the COVID-19 pandemic. It launched on November 2, 2021, at Playhouse Square in Cleveland, Ohio, The tour played over 20 cities concluding in October 2022.

=== Switzerland (2021) ===
The Le Théâtre Emmen produced a version of the musical in Swiss German which ran from December 11, 2021 until January 16, 2022. The translation by Nico Rabenald (German), Andréas Härry (Swiss German dialogues), Irène Straub and Silvio Wey (Swiss German lyrics) made some notable changes: instead of Edgewater, Indiana, the musical is set in the Lucerne hinterland. Also, the four actors aren't from Broadway, but from the German musical hub Hamburg.

=== Spain (2025) ===
In 2025, a school edition of The Prom premiered in Teatro Salesianos by Amorevo, a musical theater group. In 2024 another Spanish company did the musical with Alicia Diéguez as Emma and directed by Javier Quiñones and Irene Rivera. In the two cases, the lyrics were in Spanish.

== Plot ==
=== Act One ===
Eleanor!: The Eleanor Roosevelt Story is celebrating its opening night on Broadway with its lead cast members Dee Dee Allen and Barry Glickman ("Changing Lives"). The musical is bashed by The New York Times because Dee Dee and Barry are self-absorbed narcissists who do not understand their characters, and the show closes the same night. To improve their image, the actors decide to take up "a cause" that will make them appear selfless. They team up with two other washed-up actors — Trent Oliver, a Juilliard School graduate down on his luck who has just been cast in the non-Equity tour of Godspell, and Angie Dickinson, a life-long chorus girl who just quit after 20 years in the musical Chicago. Searching on Twitter, they find Emma, an Indiana teenager whose prom has been cancelled because she wanted to bring her girlfriend as her date. Seizing the opportunity, the actors decide to go to Indiana to help ("Changing Lives (Reprise)").

In Indiana, Emma faces bullying, but she reminds herself that not everyone is this cruel ("Just Breathe"). Mr. Hawkins, the school principal and Emma's ally, informs her that he has spoken to the state attorney general in hopes of reinstating the prom. The school holds a meeting with the homophobic PTA, but just as Emma and Mr. Hawkins begin to make progress, Dee Dee, Barry, Angie, and Trent barge in with protest signs in support of Emma. Dee Dee reminds everyone what a good person she is for doing this while claiming that this isn't about herself, humiliating Emma("It's Not About Me").

After the meeting, it is revealed that the girl Emma wants to take to prom is Alyssa, a popular but closeted student and the daughter of Mrs. Greene, the head of the PTA. The two argue as Alyssa blames Emma for all the publicity around the prom but Emma reassures her that she didn't want this and just wants to be with her ("Dance with You"). The actors attempt to hold a rally to inspire action for Emma but can only book the halftime show at a monster truck rally. They perform alongside the non-Equity tour cast of Godspell ("The Acceptance Song"). Their performance is unsuccessful as the crowd boos them offstage.

The attorney general orders the PTA to organize a new prom. Emma thanks the actors, and Mr. Hawkins and Dee Dee go to Applebee's to celebrate, while students begin to "prompose" to each other. Emma invites Alyssa to the prom, and she agrees, promising to come out to be with her ("You Happened"). At Applebee's, Mr. Hawkins, a huge fan of Dee Dee's, tells her how much she inspires him ("We Look to You").

Barry helps Emma get ready for the prom and reveals he didn't have the opportunity to go to prom either after running away from home. Meanwhile, across town, other teens prepare for the prom ("Tonight Belongs to You"). As Emma waits outside the gym, she asks Barry to walk her in because she is nervous. As they enter, they realize that the school gym is empty. Mr. Hawkins, who is inside desperately trying to resolve the issue, reveals that the PTA lied to him and have secretly moved the prom across town. Dee Dee panics that the fake prom will be bad press for her, which angers Mr. Hawkins as he realizes Dee Dee's true intentions. Emma calls Alyssa who tells her she knew nothing about the other prom. Emma asks her to come and be with her, but she refuses to come out. Devastated, Emma runs out of the gym, asking all the actors to just go home.

=== Act Two ===
Following the fake prom, the media frenzy around the whole event increases. The actors encourage Emma to step up and become the face of the story, but she is too scared. Angie encourages her with a quick lesson about "zazz", which she complements with a story about Bob Fosse and the original production of Chicago ("Zazz"). Dee Dee returns to talk to Mr. Hawkins, who berates her for being so self-centered. She performs his favorite song to make it up to him and vows to begin thinking of others ("The Lady's Improving"). Trent decides that he may be able to change the minds of the youth of the town due to his small-town upbringing. He confronts a number of the students about how they and their families break the word of the Bible every day and how hypocritical they are being. He encourages them to follow "love thy neighbor" above all ("Love Thy Neighbor").

Alyssa meets with Emma to apologize, telling her about all the pressure her mother puts on her to be perfect and how she blames Alyssa for her father leaving. Emma is unable to accept her apology and they break up ("Alyssa Greene"). The actors book Emma a TV appearance, but she turns it down and tells them that she has her own plan to control the narrative and change minds. Convinced her plan will work and that they will be able to have a prom for everyone, Emma asks Barry to be her date so that he is finally able to fulfill his dream. Barry, overjoyed, agrees as he recounts his experience missing his own prom ("Barry Is Going to Prom").

Emma uploads a video of her singing with her guitar about her struggles and longing for acceptance, but how despite that she is proud of who she is and won't hide anymore. She inspires other members of the LGBTQ+ community in the area and across the country to comment on their support for her and how it has helped them ("Unruly Heart"). The video goes viral, inspiring the actors to plan an inclusive prom for Emma and all the LGBTQ+ kids across the state. However, Mr. Hawkins realizes that the school doesn't have enough money to pay for it. The actors all donate, including Dee Dee, who turns over her American Express Black card ("Changing Lives (Act 2 Reprise)")

The PTA attempts to block the new prom but are stopped from doing so when the students voice their support, thanks to Trent's efforts to change their minds. The students suggest Trent stay in Indiana and become their drama teacher. Alyssa comes out to her mother in front of the school, confessing her love for Emma. Mrs. Greene is reluctant to accept Alyssa as she is, but Barry steps in, saying if she doesn't accept Alyssa, she is going to lose her. She is devastated but begins to become more open and agrees to listen to her daughter. The PTA backs down, and quickly makes plans for a new prom, while Dee Dee and Barry question what "success" is. The school puts on this more inclusive prom and LGBTQ+ couples from the area attend, along with the straight couples of James Madison High School. Emma and Alyssa finally get their dance and share a kiss ("It's Time to Dance").

== Musical numbers ==
Act I

- Overture - Orchestra
- "Changing Lives" - Dee Dee, Barry, Ensemble
- "Changing Lives" (Mini-Reprise) - Barry †
- "Changing Lives" (Reprise) - Dee Dee, Barry, Angie, Trent
- "Just Breathe" - Emma
- "It's Not About Me" - Dee Dee, Barry, Angie, Trent, Parents, Students
- "Dance with You" - Emma, Alyssa
- "The Acceptance Song" - Trent, Dee Dee, Barry, Angie, Godspell Cast
- "You Happened" - Emma, Alyssa, Kevin, Nick, Students
- "We Look to You" - Mr. Hawkins
- "Tonight Belongs to You" - Barry, Emma, Mrs. Greene, Shelby, Kaylee, Students
- "Tonight Belongs to You" (Reprise) - Emma ‡

Act II

- Entr'acte - Orchestra †
- "Zazz" - Angie, Emma
- "The Lady's Improving" - Dee Dee
- "Love Thy Neighbor" - Trent, Students, Godspell Cast
- "Alyssa Greene" - Alyssa
- "Barry Is Going to Prom" - Barry
- "Unruly Heart" - Emma, LGBTQ Students
- "Changing Lives (Act 2 Reprise)" - Barry, Dee Dee, Trent, Angie, Sheldon, Mr. Hawkins †
- "It's Time to Dance" - Emma, Alyssa, Company

† - Not included on the original Broadway cast recording.

‡ - Included on the Movie soundtrack, but not the Broadway cast recording

=== Recording ===
The original Broadway cast recording of The Prom was digitally released on December 14, 2018. The physical album was released on January 11, 2019.

== Characters and casts ==
Character	Atlanta	Broadway	US National Tour	Australia
Character	2016	2018	2021	2026
Emma Nolan	Caitlin Kinnunen	Caitlin Kinnunen	Kaden Kearney	Sophie (Monty) Montague
Dee Dee Allen	Beth Leavel	Beth Leavel	Courtney Balan	Caroline O’Connor
Barry Glickman	Brooks Ashmanskas	Brooks Ashmanskas	Patrick Wetzel	Brendan Monger
Alyssa Greene	Anna Grace Barlow	Isabelle McCalla	Kalyn West	Paige Fallu
Trent Oliver	Christopher Sieber	Christopher Sieber	Bud Weber	Thern Reynolds
Angie Dickinson	Angie Schworer	Angie Schworer	Emily Borromeo	Bella McSporran
Tom Hawkins	Martin Moran	Michael Potts	Sinclair Mitchell	Scott Irwin
Mrs. Greene	Courtenay Collins	Courtenay Collins	Ashanti J'Aria	Erin Bruce
Sheldon Saperstein	Josh Lamon	Josh Lamon	Shavey Brown	Brad Green

=== Notable replacements ===
Broadway

- Tom Hawkins: Michael Genet

== Critical reception ==
The Prom was the first musical of the 2018–2019 Broadway season to be named a New York Times Critics Pick, with Jesse Green calling it "such a joyful hoot. With its kinetic dancing, broad mugging and belty anthems, it makes you believe in musical comedy again."

Frank Rizzo, writing for Variety wrote that "with a tuneful score, a playful book, and performances that remind you what Broadway heart and chutzpah are all about, this cause celebre of a show turns out to be a joyous, funny, and sweet production that should appeal to several generations of musical fans."

New York Magazine's Sara Holdren wrote: "There's such genuine joy rolling off the stage in The Prom that you're ready and willing to forgive it its minor misfires... Did I shed several real tears in The Prom’s final scene? Maybe I did… I also seldom stopped laughing. The show is full of witty delights."

Adam Feldman of Time Out Magazine gave the show 4 out of 5 stars, saying "It is cheering to see a musical comedy that engages with modern questions, with a teenage lesbian romance at its center to boot... But while the issues are contemporary, there is a 1980s feel to the character types and the overall style of Chad Beguelin and Matthew Sklar's score, which resembles their work in The Wedding Singer; a stronger dose of reality in the lyrics and the book (by Beguelin and Bob Martin) would better justify the show's eventual turn to sentimental education. But Casey Nicholaw's peppy direction helps give the show enough momentum to power past its narrative potholes and occasional bumps of heavy-handedness."

In The Hollywood Reporter, David Rooney called the show “one part satire, packed with delicious theatrical in-jokes delivered with aplomb by game stage veterans playing caricatures of themselves; and one part inclusivity teaching moment, reminding us there's a place for everyone beneath the Mylar balloons at a high school dance, even in conservative Indiana. If the two halves aren't entirely seamless, especially in the uneven second act, the show has enough humor and heart to paper over the cracks."

== Other ==
Actresses Caitlin Kinnunen and Isabelle McCalla's kiss during The Prom's performance of "Time to Dance" at the 2018 Macy's Thanksgiving Day Parade received significant media attention for being the first LGBTQ kiss in the parade's broadcast history.

On August 3, 2019, after a performance of the show at the Longacre Theatre, Broadway's first-known onstage wedding ceremony occurred, between Armelle Kay Harper, a script coordinator on the show, and Jody Kay Smith, a singer and actress who had recently worked with the show's musical director. It was a same-sex wedding.

On June 17, 2019, New York/London Theatrical Licensing Agency Theatrical Rights Worldwide (TRW) acquired and announced the representation of The Prom for the ongoing licensing of the show for professional and amateur productions around the world.

== Awards and nominations ==
=== Broadway production ===
Year	Award	Category	Nominee	Result
2019	Tony Awards	Best Musical		Nominated
2019	Tony Awards	Best Book of a Musical	Chad Beguelin and Bob Martin	Nominated
2019	Tony Awards	Best Original Score	Chad Beguelin and Matthew Sklar	Nominated
2019	Tony Awards	Best Leading Actor in a Musical	Brooks Ashmanskas	Nominated
2019	Tony Awards	Best Leading Actress in a Musical	Caitlin Kinnunen	Nominated
2019	Tony Awards	Best Leading Actress in a Musical	Beth Leavel	Nominated
2019	Tony Awards	Best Direction of a Musical	Casey Nicholaw	Nominated
2019	Drama Desk Award	Outstanding Musical		Won
2019	Drama Desk Award	Outstanding Book of a Musical	Chad Beguelin and Bob Martin	Nominated
2019	Drama Desk Award	Outstanding Lyrics	Chad Beguelin	Nominated
2019	Drama Desk Award	Outstanding Actor in a Musical	Brooks Ashmanskas	Nominated
2019	Drama Desk Award	Outstanding Actress in a Musical	Beth Leavel	Nominated
2019	Outer Critics Circle Awards	Outstanding New Broadway Musical		Nominated
2019	Outer Critics Circle Awards	Outstanding New Score (Broadway or Off-Broadway)	Matthew Sklar and Chad Beguelin	Nominated
2019	Outer Critics Circle Awards	Outstanding Actor in a Musical	Brooks Ashmanskas	Nominated
2019	Outer Critics Circle Awards	Outstanding Actress in a Musical	Beth Leavel	Nominated
2019	Drama League Awards	Outstanding Production of a Broadway or Off-Broadway Musical		Nominated
2019	Drama League Awards	Distinguished Performance Award	Brooks Ashmanskas	Nominated
2019	Drama League Awards	Distinguished Performance Award	Beth Leavel	Nominated
2019	Broadway.com Audience Awards	Favorite New Musical		Nominated
2019	Broadway.com Audience Awards	Favorite Leading Actress in a Musical	Caitlin Kinnunen	Nominated
2019	Broadway.com Audience Awards	Favorite Leading Actress in a Musical	Beth Leavel	Nominated
2019	Broadway.com Audience Awards	Favorite Funny Performance	Beth Leavel	Nominated
2019	Broadway.com Audience Awards	Favorite Funny Performance	Brooks Ashmanskas	Nominated
2019	Broadway.com Audience Awards	Favorite Diva Performance	Brooks Ashmanskas	Nominated
2019	Broadway.com Audience Awards	Favorite Onstage Pair	Caitlin Kinnunen and Isabelle McCalla	Nominated
2019	Broadway.com Audience Awards	Favorite Breakthrough Performance (Female)	Isabelle McCalla	Nominated
2019	Broadway.com Audience Awards	Favorite New Song	"Dance With You"	Nominated

== Novelization ==
The UK and Commonwealth novelization rights of the play, written by Saundra Mitchell, were acquired by Penguin Random House's editorial and media development director Holly Harris, who did a pre-emptive deal with Creative Artists Agency and William Morris Endeavor.

== See also ==
- 2010 Itawamba County School District prom controversy
