= Elf (musical) =

Musical composed by Matthew Sklar and Chad Beguelin

- Broadway Playbill (2010)
- Music: Matthew Sklar
- Lyrics: Chad Beguelin
- Book: Bob Martin; Thomas Meehan
- Basis: Elf by David Berenbaum
- Productions: 2010 Broadway; 2012 Broadway revival 2013 US tour 2015 West End; 2022 West End revival 2023 West End revival 2024 Broadway revival 2025 West End revival

Elf is a musical based on the 2003 motion picture, with a score by Matthew Sklar and Chad Beguelin. The book is adapted by Bob Martin and Thomas Meehan from the film.

The musical premiered on Broadway in the Christmas season of 2010 and was revived in 2012 and 2024. It played in London's West End in 2015, 2022, 2023, and 2025, and it has toured extensively in English-speaking countries, often during the Christmas holiday season.

== Synopsis ==
=== Act 1 ===
Santa Claus, annoyed that his football game has been recorded over, opens a large pop-up book to read a story. Buddy is the happiest and tallest elf by far ("Christmastown"). It turns out that Buddy is human. Santa explains that Buddy's mother had died, and, as an orphan, he had crawled into Santa's toy sack; arriving at the North Pole, he was raised as an elf. Santa encourages Buddy to go to New York City to find his birth father, Walter Hobbs, who is on the naughty list because he doesn't believe in Santa. Nevertheless, Buddy hopes that Walter will be the "World's Greatest Dad".

Walter works long hours as a book publisher in the Empire State Building. Too busy to shop for gifts with his son, Michael, and wife, Emily, he laments that Christmas gets "In the Way". Dressed in his elf clothes, Buddy finds Walter's office, where he is mistaken for a singing telegram entertainer, but he sings that Walter is his father. Walter does not believe him and has building security take Buddy to the nearby Macy's Department Store North Pole village. The employees there love Buddy's happy Christmas spirit ("Sparklejollytwinklejingley"). Buddy quickly falls for Jovie, a practical-minded Macy's elf, and persuades her to go on a date with him. The next day, however, Buddy sees Macy's Santa and declares that he is not the real Santa, causing a fracas. The police bring him to the residence of the Hobbs family.

There, Michael and Emily are struggling to build a science project. Buddy helps them to complete the project, in exchange for Michael and Emily sending a letter to Santa asking for quality time with Walter ("I'll Believe in You"). Walter gets home, and they convince him to let Buddy sleep there for the night. In the morning, they receive the results of a DNA test that Emily arranged; it proves that Buddy is Walter's son ("In the Way" (reprise)). Reluctantly, he takes Buddy to his office, because Emily has a meeting. Buddy, wearing a new suit like his dad's, hopes to be "Just Like Him". Mr. Greenway, Walter's boss, tells Walter that if he does not publish a hit children's book by Christmas Eve, he will be fired; Walter, under pressure, grows even more frustrated by Buddy's distracting exuberance.

Buddy takes Jovie on a date, and the two have romantic chemistry. He plans to fulfill her Christmas wish by taking her to dinner at Tavern on the Green. Jovie enjoys Buddy's enthusiasm as he encourages her to spread Christmas Cheer by loudly singing "A Christmas Song". Buddy is eager to tell Walter that he is in love and decides to cheer up his dad by making it snow in his office, so he shreds up some paper that turns out to be the manuscript of the children's book that Walter is feverishly working on. Walter angrily tosses Buddy out of the office, asking him never to return. Buddy is despondent ("World Greatest Dad" (reprise)).

=== Act 2 ===
Santa recounts that Buddy left a farewell message for the Hobbs family. On Christmas Eve, hungry and alone on the streets of New York, Buddy finds a Chinese restaurant, where he meets unhappy, out-of-a-job fake Santas complaining that "Nobody Cares About Santa". Buddy is two hours late for his date with Jovie, who is waiting angrily in front of Tavern on the Green. She vows: "Never Fall in Love (With an Elf)". When Buddy shows up, he gives her a snow globe that Santa had given him when he departed from the North Pole, but she is too disappointed and departs.

Emily and Michael find Buddy's letter and wish to retrieve him. Out of their apartment window, they see Santa's sleigh and realize that they have been wrong: "There Is a Santa Claus". They go to the Empire State Building, where Buddy also arrives, to find Walter sweating as he works to pitch a book idea to his boss. Buddy suggests "The Story of Buddy the Elf". Mr. Greenway loves the idea but says the book should be about a horse, rather than an elf. He demands that Walter work through Christmas to produce the book. However, Mr. Greenway overplays his hand by rudely criticizing Walter's sons, and Walter quits his job. Michael relates that he and his mother saw Santa's sleigh land. This alarms Buddy, as he knows this means that the sleigh must have lost power from a lack of Christmas spirit in New York City. The Hobbs family rushes to Central Park ("Nobody Cares About Santa" (reprise)).

Buddy is struck by a plan. He sees a news crew covering a purported UFO event. Grabbing the reporter's microphone, he encourages all New Yorkers to spread the Christmas spirit to repower the sleigh and speed Santa on his way. Jovie appears, and she starts to sing "A Christmas Song" (reprise). Other New Yorkers begin to sing, and their collective Christmas cheer works. Santa invites Buddy to come home with him to the North Pole, but at last, Buddy feels that he has a place in New York, where he can continue making everyone happy.

On Christmas Day at his home, Santa closes the big book and hears a knock on his door. There he finds Buddy, Jovie, their new baby, Buddy Jr., and the rest of the Hobbs family arriving to celebrate Christmas with him. This becomes their annual tradition.

=== Differences from the film ===
Instead of Santa Claus, the film is narrated by Papa Elf, who does not appear in the musical. Other minor changes from the movie to the musical include Santa Claus using an iPhone instead of a list of names while delivering gifts, Buddy and Jovie's child being changed from a girl to a boy, the department store scenes taking place at Macy's instead of Gimbels, and Buddy being dropped off at the Hobbs house instead of being bailed out of jail by Walter. The musical also adds a subplot about Michael and Emily Hobbs' disbelief in Santa Claus. And instead of having an elf named Ming Ming, they changed the name to Charlie and had a girl elf named Shwanda.

Several scenes from the film are absent, including Buddy's visit to the mail room of the Empire State Building, and Buddy rescuing Michael from school bullies in a Central Park snowball fight. The character of Miles Finch is cut in the musical. In the musical, Walter's staff writers happen upon the only copy of an unpublished manuscript for a Christmas story by deceased famous author Chris Smith. Buddy shreds the document, not understanding its significance. This is when Walter angrily says he wishes Buddy wasn't his son, instead of in the aftermath of the Miles Finch scene.

The film and musical strongly deviate in the character of Walter. In the film, Walter is portrayed as greedy, obsessed with his work, and deliberately neglectful of his family duties. In the musical, he is shown as merely bumbling, forgetful, and overworked. Santa Claus explains in the film that Walter is on his "naughty" list because of his greed and general meanness, whereas in the musical it is because he doesn't believe in Santa. In the musical, after Buddy pitches the idea of making the book about how he came to the North Pole (leading into the song, "The Story of Buddy the Elf"), Mr. Greenway loves the story, but Walter quits after Mr. Greenway insults his sons; in the film Walter chooses to go with Michael to bring Buddy back home, instead of pitching anything to Mr. Greenway, which leads to his firing.

== Musical numbers ==
The musical numbers in the original Broadway production were as follows:

Act I

1. Overture – Orchestra
2. "Christmastown" – Santa, Buddy, Company
3. "World's Greatest Dad" – Buddy
4. "In the Way" – Deb, Walter, Emily, Michael, Company
5. "Sparklejollytwinklejingley" – Buddy, Store Manager, Company
6. "I'll Believe in You" – Michael and Emily
7. "In the Way" (reprise) – Emily and Walter
8. "Just Like Him" – Buddy, Deb, Company
9. "A Christmas Song" – Buddy, Jovie, Company
10. "I'll Believe in You" (reprise) – Buddy and Company

Act II

1. Entr'acte – Orchestra
2. "Nobody Cares About Santa" – Fake Santas, Store Manager, Buddy
3. "Never Fall in Love" – Jovie
4. "There Is a Santa Claus" – Michael and Emily
5. "The Story of Buddy the Elf" – Buddy, Michael, Walter, Mr. Greenway, Emily, Deb, Company
6. "Nobody Cares About Santa" (reprise) – Santa
7. "A Christmas Song" (reprise) – Jovie, Buddy, Emily, Michael, Walter, Company
8. Finale – Company

=== Notes ===
- Subsequent productions including the Broadway revival and West End production replaced "Christmastown" with "Happy All the Time" and "I'll Believe in You (Reprise)" with "World's Greatest Dad (Reprise)".

== Casts ==
The original principal casts of major productions.

Character	Broadway	Broadway Revival	West End	West End Revival	West End Revival	Broadway Revival	West End Revival
Character	2010	2012	2015	2022	2023	2024	2025
Buddy	Sebastian Arcelus	Jordan Gelber	Ben Forster	Simon Lipkin	Matthew Wolfenden	Grey Henson	Joel Montague
Jovie	Amy Spanger	Leslie Kritzer	Kimberley Walsh	Georgina Castle	Georgina Castle	Kayla Davion	Carrie Hope Fletcher
Emily Hobbs	Beth Leavel	Beth Leavel	Jessica Martin	Rebecca Lock	Rebecca Lock	Ashley Brown	Rosanna Hyland
Walter Hobbs	Mark Jacoby	Mark Jacoby	Joe McGann	Tom Chambers	Tom Chambers	Michael Hayden	Aled Jones
Michael Hobbs	Matthew Gumley; Matthew Schechter	Mitchell Sink	Ilan Galkoff; Harry Collett; Noah Key; Ewan Rutherford	Dexter Barry; Logan Clark; Alfie Morwood; Frankie Treadaway	Jude Farrant; Daniel Lee; Oliver Ravellini; Austin Riley	Kai Edgar	Ayrton English; Max Garlick; Harry Georgiou; Samuel Sturge
Santa Claus	George Wendt	Wayne Knight	Mark McKerracher	Nicholas Pound	Nicholas Pound	Sean Astin	Martyn Ellis
Mr. Greenway	Michael McCormick	Adam Heller	Mark McKerracher	Nicholas Pound	Nicholas Pound	Sean Astin	Martyn Ellis
Deb	Valerie Wright	Valerie Wright	Jennie Dale	Kim Ismay	Kim Ismay	Jennifer Sanchez	Lucinda Lawrence
Store Manager/Hot Dog Vendor	Michael Mandell	Michael Mandell	Graham Lappin	Dermot Canavan	Dermot Canavan	Kalen Allen	Dermot Canavan

== Production history ==
2010 Broadway cast

=== Broadway ===
After a 2009 workshop, the musical officially opened for a limited holiday engagement at the Al Hirschfeld Theatre on Broadway on November 14, 2010, following previews from November 2, 2010. Casey Nicholaw directed. The final performance took place January 2, 2011 after a run of 15 preview and 57 regular performances. A Broadway cast recording was released on November 1, 2011. Leading the original cast was Wicked and Jersey Boys star Sebastian Arcelus, who was joined by Broadway alums Amy Spanger and Beth Leavel.

Following the success of the 2010 production, the musical returned to the Al Hirschfeld for a second holiday season beginning November 9, 2012, on a run through January 6, 2013. This new production featured a revised book and a new opening number, "Happy All the Time".

Elf returned to Broadway at the Marquis Theatre, with previews from November 9, 2024, and an official opening on November 17; it closed on January 4, 2025. The staging reproduced the 2022 London production. It starred Grey Henson as Buddy and Sean Astin as Santa and Mr. Greenway, with Kayla Davion as Jovie, Ashley Brown as Emily, Michael Hayden as Walter, Kai Edgar as Michael, Jennifer Sanchez as Deb and Kalen Allen as Store Manager and Hot Dog Vendor. The creative team was identical to the one for the West End productions in 2022 and 2023, with the addition of Peter Fitzgerald on the sound design. It was produced by Temple Live Entertainment, Crossroads Live North America and Nederlander Presentations. The production set a box office record at the Marquis.

=== West End ===
A production of the musical opened at the Dominion Theatre on October 24, 2015, for a 10-week run until January 2, 2016, after brief runs with substantially the same cast at the Theatre Royal, Plymouth, in December 2014) and at the Bord Gáis Energy Theatre in Dublin from December 2014 to January 2015). It was co-produced by Michael Rose and U-Live, directed and choreographed by Morgan Young, and featured Ben Forster as Buddy and Kimberley Walsh as Jovie. It received mixed reviews. In 2015 it was reported that the production was the fastest selling show since the Dominion Theatre opened in 1929.

Elf returned to the Dominion Theatre, with previews from November 14, 2022, and an official opening on November 24; it closed on January 7, 2023. The cast included Simon Lipkin as Buddy and Georgina Castle as Jovie. The production was directed by Philip Wm. McKinley, with choreography by Liam Steel, set and costume design by Tim Goodchild, lighting design by Patrick Woodroffe, sound design by Gareth Owen, video design by Ian William Galloway. It was produced by Temple Live Entertainment. The musical returned to the Dominion again from November 15, 2023, until January 6, 2024. The cast included Matthew Wolfenden as Buddy and Georgina Castle as Jovie. Both productions set box office records at the theatre.

The musical returned to the West End at the Aldwych Theatre from October 28, 2025 with an official opening on November 6, and played until January 3, 2026, with the same creative team as the previous West End productions.

=== North American tours ===
Presented by NETworks, a mini-tour of the musical played several cities across North America in the 2012 holiday season. Two separate tours, running simultaneously, began in 2013, and the musical toured again in the holiday seasons in 2014, 2015, and 2016.

A limited US/Canadian tour in 2017 featured Erik Gratton as Buddy, with direction by Sam Scalamoni and choreography by Connor Gallagher. It stopped at the Madison Square Garden Theater in New York City with George Wendt playing Santa. TimeOut said it was one of the best Christmas shows in New York that year.

=== Other noteworthy productions ===
A production ran at the 5th Avenue Theatre in Seattle, Washington, from November 30 to December 31, 2012. A Canadian production ran from November 20, 2012, to January 6, 2013, at Neptune Theatre, Nova Scotia. A 2013 touring production ran under the name Elf the Musical. A regional production ran at the Paper Mill Playhouse from November 26, 2014 until January 4, 2015.

There was a late 2017 UK tour ending January 14, 2018 in The Lowry theatre in Salford, England, with Ben Forster as Buddy. On December 24, 2017, a film of the production aired on Channel 5, after being recorded live at The Lowry.

An arena tour in December 2018 stopped at Cardiff Motorpoint Arena, Resorts World Arena in Birmingham and Motorpoint Arena Nottingham. The tour returned in December 2019 to M&S Bank Arena in Liverpool, SSE Hydro in Glasgow, Wembley Arena and Dublin's 3 Arena. This production had three stages. The audience decorated a 30-foot-tall Christmas tree and took part in a giant snowball fight. The production included a flying sleigh among other stunts and effects. Enormous TV screens relayed the action and added CGI scenery. In both productions, Tam Ryan played Buddy, Kym Marsh played Jovie, and Shaun Williamson played Walter. The cast included over 100 performers.

The musical was presented in UK arenas again in December 2022 by World's Biggest Panto at M&S Bank Arena in Liverpool, P&J Live Arena in Aberdeen, OVO Hydro in Glasgow, Resorts World Arena in Birmingham, Motorpoint Arena in Cardiff and Motorpoint Arena Nottingham. The show also had a stint in the Winter Gardens, Blackpool, at the Opera House. Elf: The Musical was performed at the Sydney Opera House in December 2024. Directed by Eric Giancola and choreographed by Mitch Woodcock, the production featured Lara Mulcahy in a dual role as Santa Claus and the store manager in addition to Simon Burke as Walter Hobbs.

== TV adaptation ==
On December 16, 2014, NBC broadcast a stop-motion animated adaptation of the musical entitled Elf: Buddy's Musical Christmas. It featured the voices of Jim Parsons as Buddy, Mark Hamill as Walter, Ed Asner reprising his film role as Santa, Kate Micucci as Jovie, Rachael MacFarlane as Emily, Max Charles as Michael, Gilbert Gottfried as Mr. Greenway, and Jay Leno as the leader of the fake Santas. The screenplay was written by Andrew Horvath and Michael Jelenic, with Martin and Meehan. It contained the songs from the musical and also featured a new song titled "Freezy the Snowman".

== Response ==
=== Critical reception ===
Reviews of Broadway productions included one by Mark Kennedy of ABC News called the 2012 Broadway production "a tight, polished, expensive-looking affair that has enough jokes for adults and enough special effects for kids." The 2024 Broadway revival received generally favorable reviews, with comments such as "Lands on the very, very nice list" (The New York Times), "Really elfin' good!" (Time Out), "A shot of pure joy that's fun for the whole family" (The New York Sun), and "Miraculously, this revival exudes freshness" (The New Yorker).

Reviews of the West End show in 2015 were mixed. The Guardian did not much like the performance, but it praised Ben Forster as Buddy for his "anarchic glee". Regarding the 2022 West End production, Time Out wrote, "Philip Wm McKinley's production is a fast-paced, Tim Burton-esque visual feast, full of exaggerated angles, art deco stylings and slick projections."

Among reviews of North American tours was a 2013 The Washington Post piece that said the musical made the movie look "nuanced". A 2017 tour received a mostly positive review in the Chicago Sun Times, which said the "immense energy" of the show could be overwhelming, and from the Deseret News.

Among other productions, the 2017 UK run at The Lowry was praised by the Manchester Evening News. The New York Times critic described the 2017 Madison Square Garden Theatre production as "tinseled in synthetic sentiment, performed with a cheer that borders on mania, and instantly forgettable."

=== Box office ===
The original production of the musical broke box office records at the Hirschfeld Theatre three times, grossing over a million dollars in one week. It was the third best-grossing show for the 2010 Thanksgiving weekend, behind Wicked and The Lion King.

== Awards and honors ==
Year	Award	Category	Outcome
2011	Drama League Awards	Distinguished Production of a Musical	Nominated
