= Matthew Sklar =

American composer for musical theatre, television, and film

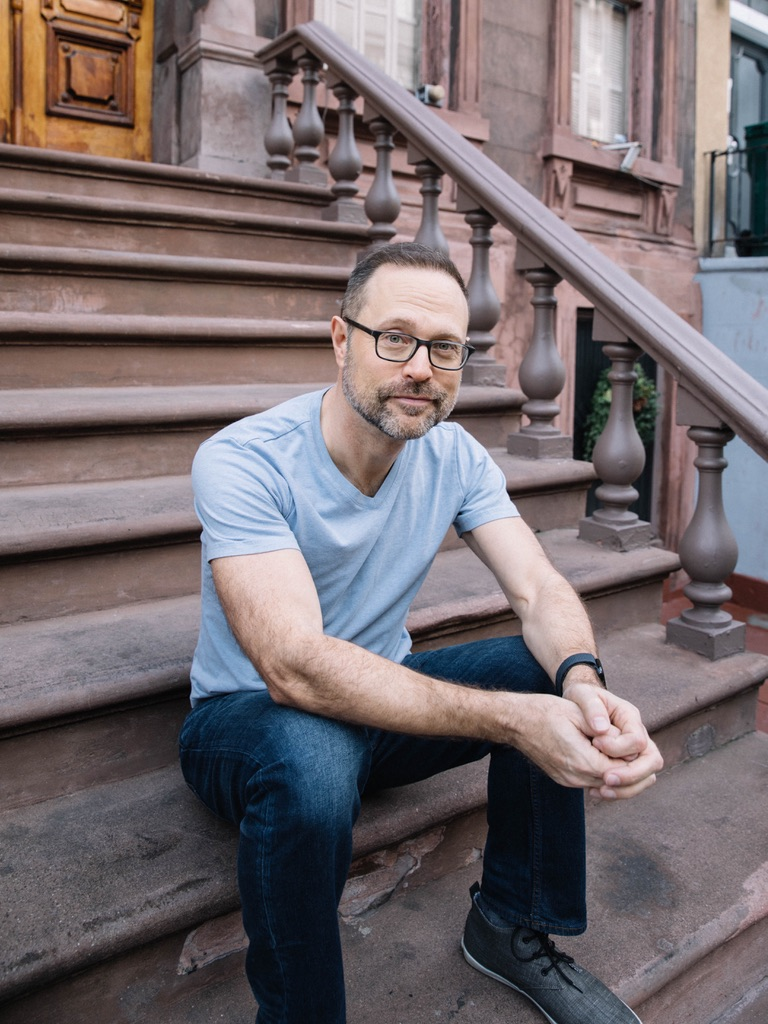

Matthew Sklar (born October 7, 1973) is an American composer for musical theatre, television, and film. His works have appeared on Broadway, the West End, and theatres worldwide. Sklar has written primarily with lyricist Chad Beguelin, having written music for their Broadway shows The Prom, Elf the Musical, and The Wedding Singer. The Prom and The Wedding Singer earned him nominations for the Tony Award for Best Original Score.

== Biography ==
=== Early life ===
A native of Westfield, New Jersey, Sklar is the middle child of Dr. Talbot Sklar, a pediatric dentist, and Susan Sklar, a teacher. He attended Edison Intermediate School and graduated from Westfield High School in 1991. He was active in the high school's music and drama programs, and also participated in the Westfield Summer Workshop. Sklar credits his start in composing to his music teacher, Kristine Smith-Morasso at Edison, who asked him to write a song for his 9th grade graduation. On a whim, he sent the song to the hit Disney Channel show the All-New Mickey Mouse Club. The producers chose the song to be performed by cast member Jennifer McGill and Sklar was subsequently interviewed on the program.

He graduated with honors in 1991 from the Juilliard School Pre-College Division as a composition major. His piece Symphonics, for full orchestra, was premiered at Lincoln Center by the Juilliard Pre-College Orchestra, conducted by Sklar. He then studied at New York University from 1991 to 1995.

=== Work ===
As an 18-year-old freshman at New York University, Sklar began playing keyboards for the Broadway production of Les Misérables, eventually conducting the show at age 21. He has also been a keyboardist, conductor, and/or arranger for many Broadway productions including Shrek, 42nd Street, Miss Saigon, Nine and Caroline, or Change. Sklar also appeared onstage as "Oscar" in the Broadway revival of 42nd Street.

He made his Broadway debut as a composer for the new musical The Wedding Singer, with Chad Beguelin writing the lyrics. He was nominated for the 2006 Tony Award for Best Original Score for The Wedding Singer. His second Broadway musical, Elf, broke box office records at the Al Hirschfeld Theatre. The show has played all over the world and has become a staple in the musical theatre repertoire.

Sklar received a 2015 Primetime Emmy Award nomination for Outstanding Music Direction for the NBC stop-motion animated TV special Elf: Buddy's Musical Christmas, starring Jim Parsons. He adapted and arranged the music of Marvin Hamlisch for the Emmy Award-winning documentary film Marvin Hamlisch: What He Did For Love, seen on PBS/American Masters. Sklar has contributed original songs/music to Sesame Street, Wonder Pets!, and the NBC Broadcast of The Macy's Thanksgiving Day Parade. His music has been performed by the Atlanta, Baltimore, and Indianapolis Symphony Orchestras.

His most recent Broadway work is the original musical The Prom, winner of the 2019 Drama Desk Award for Outstanding Musical. The Prom is based on a concept by Jack Viertel; the book is by Bob Martin and Chad Beguelin, music by Sklar, lyrics by Beguelin, and directed/choreographed by Casey Nicholaw. The musical, set in small town Indiana, involves a high school student who is banned from her prom because she wants to bring her girlfriend. A group of Broadway actors hears about the situation and travels to the town to help the student. The musical premiered at the Alliance Theatre, Atlanta, Georgia, on August 18, 2016 in previews. This out-of-town production received positive reviews. Frank Rizzo, in his Variety review, wrote that it is "a loopy, loving and joyous musical."

The Prom opened on Broadway at the Longacre Theatre on November 15, 2018, with previews starting on October 23, 2018, to positive reviews, including a New York Times Critic's Pick. Jesse Green, chief theatre critic for The New York Times, wrote in his review that The Prom “makes you believe in musical comedy again.” For his work on The Prom, Sklar received his second Tony Award nomination for Best Original Score and the Dramatists Guild of America Frederick Loewe Award for Dramatic Composition.

The 2024 Broadway revival of Elf the Musical, a transfer of the successful 2022-2023 London production directed by Phil McKinley, broke box office records at the Marquis Theatre. It now holds the top two highest-grossing eight-performance weeks, with grosses of $2,295,549 and $2,230,419, respectively. The production, starring Tony nominee Grey Henson as Buddy and Oscar nominee Sean Astin as Santa, received positive reviews.

In 2025, this production of Elf the Musical returned to London’s West End at the Aldwych Theatre and launched a U.S. Tour.

== Broadway credits ==
As composer:

- The Prom - Original music
- Elf – Original music
- The Wedding Singer – Original music

Other credits:

- Shrek – Dance arrangements
- Caroline, or Change – associate conductor
- Nine – rehearsal pianist, associate conductor
- Oklahoma! (2002 revival) – rehearsal pianist
- 42nd Street (2001 revival) – associate conductor
- Putting It Together – assistant conductor
- Annie Get Your Gun (1999 revival) – rehearsal pianist
- On the Town (1998 revival) – rehearsal pianist
- Titanic – associate conductor
- Miss Saigon – assistant conductor, replacement
- Les Misérables – associate conductor, replacement

== Awards, nominations and honors ==
Year	Award	Category	Work	Result
2000	Jonathan Larson Performing Arts Foundation Award			Won
2003	Gilman Gonzalez-Falla Musical Theater Award			Won
2006	Tony Award	Best Original Score	The Wedding Singer	Nominated
2006	Drama Desk Award	Outstanding Music	The Wedding Singer	Nominated
2010	ASCAP Foundation Richard Rodgers New Horizons Award			Won
2015	Emmy Award	Outstanding Music Direction	Elf: Buddy's Musical Christmas	Nominated
2015	Annie Award	Music in an Animated TV/Broadcast Production	Elf: Buddy's Musical Christmas	Nominated
2019	Dramatists Guild of America	Frederick Loewe Award for Dramatic Composition		Won
2019	Tony Award	Best Original Score	The Prom	Nominated
2019	Outer Critics Circle Award	Outstanding New Score	The Prom	Nominated
2021	Hollywood Critics Association	Best Song	The Prom	Nominated
2021	CinEuphoria Awards	Best Original Song	The Prom	Nominated
2021	Hawaii Film Critics Society	Best Song	The Prom	Nominated
2021	Denver Film Critics Society Awards	Best Original Song	The Prom	Nominated
2021	Houston Film Critics Society Awards	Best Original Song	The Prom	Nominated
2022	Los Angeles Drama Critics Circle	Best Score	The Prom	Nominated
