= Isabelle McCalla =

American actress and singer (born 1993)

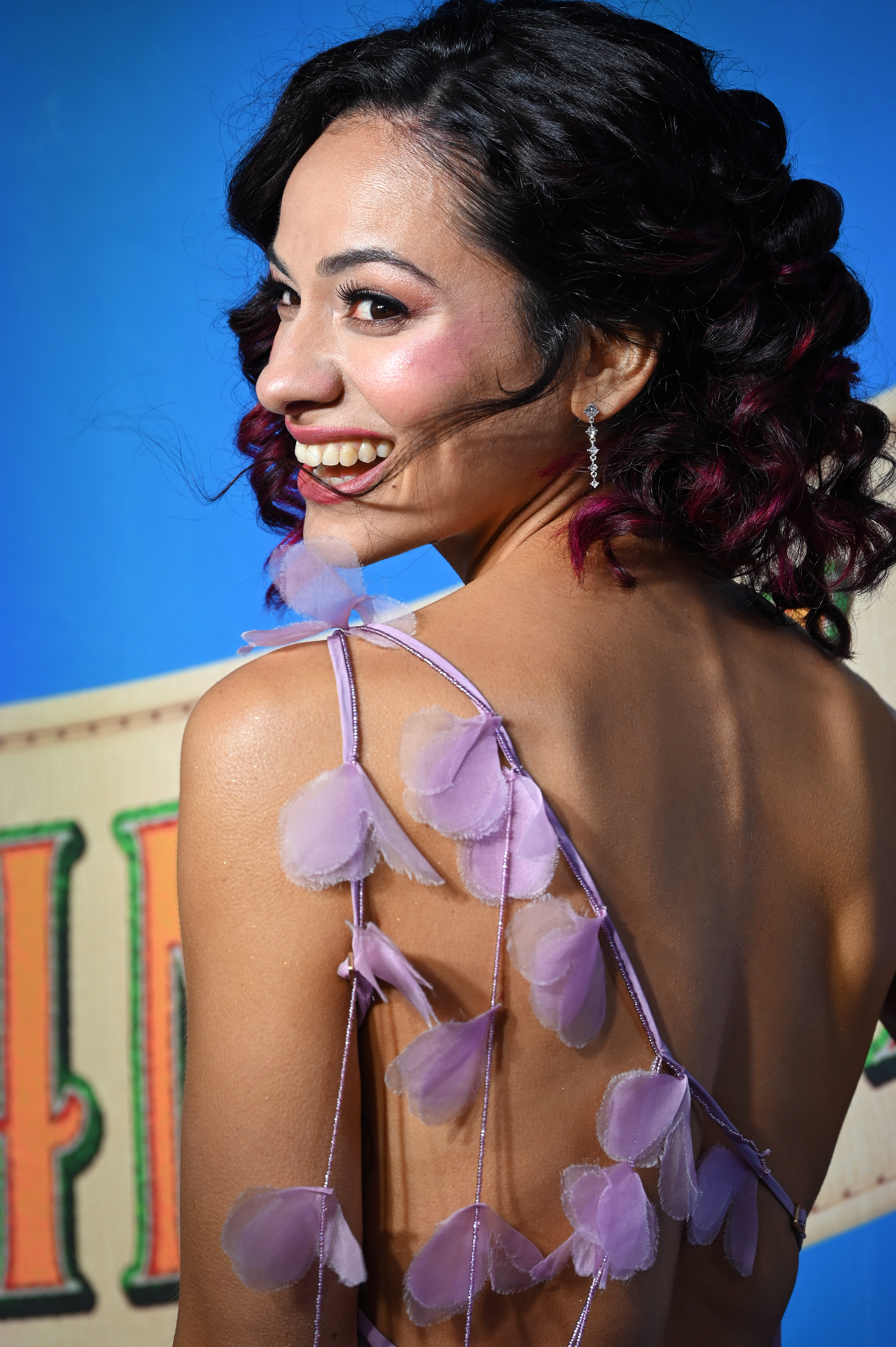
- McCalla in 2026
- Born: June 15, 1993 (age 33); Queens, U.S.
- Other name: Izzy McCalla
- Education: University of Michigan (BFA)
- Occupations: Actress, singer, dancer
- Years active: 2015–present

Isabelle McCalla (born June 15, 1993) is an American actress and singer best known on stage as Alyssa Greene in The Prom and Jasmine in Aladdin.

== Early life and education ==
McCalla was born in Queens and grew up in Suffern, New York. She has a younger brother named Colin. McCalla attended Rockland Country Day School. She studied dance at Coupé Theater Studio from a young age. McCalla was enrolled in ballet class in third grade to learn discipline, and she took more classes as she entered high school. She attended the University of Michigan and graduated in 2015.

== Career ==
McCalla made her Broadway debut in January 2018, as Jasmine in Disney's Aladdin. She had previously originated the role in the first national tour.

Later in 2018, McCalla originated the role of Alyssa Greene in The Prom on Broadway. She had previously performed as an ensemble member in the show's Atlanta premiere in 2016. McCalla and co-star Caitlin Kinnunen's kiss during their performance at the 2018 Macy's Thanksgiving Day Parade made national news as the first LGBT kiss in the parade's history.

McCalla appeared across the US performing beloved songs as part of the Disney Princess — The Concert tour.

McCalla replaced Caroline Innerbichler as Maizy in Shucked on Broadway at the Nederlander Theater in early September 2023. In 2024, she starred with Grant Gustin in the Broadway musical adaptation of the novel, Water for Elephants.

In February 2025, it was announced that McCalla would portray Elinor in the musical Regency Girls, which is set to premiere on April 10, 2025.

== Personal life ==
McCalla's father is from Haiti.

In 2019, McCalla came out as queer and bisexual on the Thank You For Coming Out podcast.

== Filmography ==
=== Film ===
Year	Title	Role	Notes	Ref.
2025	The Hermit	Doris		
TBA	Aladdin: The Broadway Musical	Jasmine	Filmed recording of 2019 West End Musical	

=== Television ===
Year	Network	Title	Role	Notes	Ref.
2019	PIX11	Broadway Profiles with Tamsen Fadal	Herself	Episode: "A New Year On Broadway "	
2017	CBS	Bull	Erica	Episode: "E.J."	

=== Web ===
Year	Title	Role	Notes	Ref.
2020	Gallery View	Lulu	YouTube web series written by Ellyn Marsh and Gavin Lodge	

== Stage credits ==
Year(s)	Production	Role	Location	Category	Ref.
2012	Aladdin	Ensemble	The Muny	Regional	
2013	42nd Street	Ensemble	Benedum Center	Regional	
2013	West Side Story	Rosalia	The Muny	Regional	
2014	Singin' in the Rain	Zelda Zanders	Benedum Center	Regional	
2014	Legally Blonde	Pilar	Benedum Center	Regional	
2014	Footloose	Ensemble	Benedum Center	Regional	
2014	Cabaret	Sally Bowles	University of Michigan	Regional	
2015	Mary Poppins	Mrs. Corry	Benedum Center	Regional	
2016	West Side Story	Anita	Miracle Theatre	Regional	
2016	Mary Poppins	Mrs. Corry	Sarofim Hall	Regional	
2016	42nd Street	Ensemble	The Muny	Regional	
2016	The Prom	Ensemble	Alliance Theatre	Regional	
2017–2018	Aladdin	Jasmine	National Tour	Touring	
2018	Aladdin	Jasmine	New Amsterdam Theatre	Broadway	
2018–2019	The Prom	Alyssa Greene	Longacre Theatre	Broadway	
2019	Footloose	Ariel Moore	Kennedy Center	Regional	
2019	Fun Home	Joan	Plaza Jewish Community Chapel	Benefit Reading	
2020	Fly	Tink	La Jolla Playhouse	Regional	
2021	Clue	Yvette	Paper Mill Playhouse	Regional	
2023	Hercules	Meg	Paper Mill Playhouse	Regional	
2023	Water for Elephants	Marlena Rackinger	Alliance Theatre	Regional	
2023–2024	Shucked	Maizy	Nederlander Theater	Broadway	
2024	Water for Elephants	Marlena Rackinger / June	Imperial Theater	Broadway	
2025	Schmigadoon!	Emma Tate	Kennedy Center	Regional	
2025	Regency Girls	Elinor Benton	Old Globe Theatre	Regional	
2026	Schmigadoon!	Emma Tate	Nederlander Theater	Broadway	

== Awards and nominations ==
Year	Award	Category	Nominated Work	Result
2019	Broadway.com Audience Awards	Favorite Onstage Pair (with Caitlin Kinnunen)	The Prom	Nominated
2019	Broadway.com Audience Awards	Favorite Breakthrough Performance (Female)	The Prom	Nominated
2024	Broadway.com Audience Awards	Favorite Leading Actress in a Musical	Water for Elephants	Nominated
2026	Chita Rivera Awards	Outstanding Dancer in a Broadway Show	Schmigadoon!	Won
