= Matthew Schechter =

American actor

- Born: October 15, 2000 (age 25); New York, New York
- Occupations: Actor, voice actor, stage actor, screen actor
- Years active: 2006-present

Matthew Schechter (born October 15, 2000) is an American actor. Schechter has performed in six Broadway shows since his debut in 2009. In addition, Schechter has worked on several television programs, including Law & Order, 30 Rock, and What Would You Do?. Most recently, Schechter filmed Bad Dads, a drama-comedy short film with costar Danny Burstein and acted as Peter Best in Law & Order: Special Victims Unit.

== Theatrical career ==
=== Broadway Productions ===
Schechter made his Broadway debut in 2009 as Boy in the revival of Waiting for Godot. He performed alongside Nathan Lane, Bill Irwin, John Goodman, and John Glover. The production was nominated for three Tony Awards and became one of Roundabout Theatre Company's greatest successes. Months later, Schechter appeared as Michael Banks in Disney's 2006 production of Mary Poppins. After one year of work as Michael Banks, Schechter joined a cast led by Sebastian Arcelus in the original production of Elf: The Musical. There, Schechter stood-by for the role of Michael and performed nightly as Boy. The production received mixed reviews, but was revived on Broadway in 2012. Approximately one year after the closing of Elf: The Musical, Schechter originated Les in Newsies (2012), receiving exceptional reviews for his work. Ben Brantley of The New York Times described Schechter as a "wisecracking, deadpan child prodigy." After over a year of performance, Schechter left the show shortly after the departure of star Jeremy Jordan. Subsequently, Schechter joined the 2013 cast of Richard III, where he played Prince Edward among fellow actors Samuel Barnett and Mark Rylance. The play, brought to New York City by the Globe Theatre, was a sold-out success. Immediately after Richard III had concluded, Schechter created the roles of Moss Hart and Bernie Hart in director James Lapine's Act One (2014). The show was praised by Ben Brantley; Schechter received excellent reviews. The New York Times again heralded Schechter as "a very fine" actor. The play's cast included Tony Shalhoub, Andrea Martin, and Santino Fontana.

=== Off-Broadway Productions ===
Schechter has performed in various readings, workshops, and Off-Broadway productions. In 2011, Schechter performed in Dael Orlandersmith and Gordon Edelstein's Horsedreams at the Rattlestick Playwrights Theater. He received recognition from publications including Variety, "a wonderfully natural performance by the amazing Matthew Schechter" and The New York Times, "Mr. Schechter is absolutely wonderful as his child who makes seeming older than his years tragic." Additionally, Schechter has sung with the New York City Opera in productions of Tosca and Cavalleria Rusticana.

== Film and television career ==
=== Filmography ===
Year	Title	Role	Notes
2006	Law & Order	Thomas	
2008	Z Rock	J.J. Gottfried	
2009	Important Things with Demetri Martin	Boy	
2009	30 Rock	Jayden	
2012	A Gifted Man	Boy	
2012	Saturday Night Live	Himself	
2012	66th Tony Awards	Himself	
2012	Disney 365	Himself	
2013	What Would You Do?	Boy Scout	
2013	Late Show with David Letterman	'Vienna Choir Boy'	
2015	What Would You Do?	Himself	
2015	Bad Dads		
2015	Law & Order: Special Victims Unit	Peter Best	

Schechter has also performed as a voice actor in commercials and other recordings.
