= Jo Ellen Pellman =

American actress

- Born: October 29, 1995 (age 30); Ohio, U.S.
- Education: University of Michigan (BFA)
- Occupation: Actress
- Years active: 2019–present
- Known for: The Prom
- Spouse: Brydie O'Connor (m. 2025)
- Website: joellenpellman.com

Jo Ellen Pellman (born October 29, 1995) is an American actress best known for her leading role as Emma Nolan in the 2020 Netflix musical film The Prom.

== Early life and education ==
Jo Ellen Pellman was born in Ohio and grew up in Cincinnati. She was raised by a single mother. Growing up, she was in her school's choir, studied tap and ballet, and went to theater camp.

Pellman graduated in 2018 from the University of Michigan with a BFA in musical theatre and a minor in creative writing. While training, she played roles in Me and My Girl, The Drowsy Chaperone and Grand Concourse. She has also studied Shakespeare at the London Academy of Music and Dramatic Art.

== Career ==
In 2018, Pellman played bit parts on Comedy Central's Alternatino, HBO's The Deuce, and episode 5 of season 3 of Amazon Prime's The Marvelous Mrs. Maisel.

Ryan Murphy cast Pellman as the protagonist of The Prom named Emma Nolan, after a nationwide search, in her film debut opposite of Ariana DeBose. Murphy said, "She spoke very movingly about being a queer woman and having a gay single mom who raised her. I remember she walked out and I was just like, 'Thank God, that's over — we've found our girl.'" It was her first film.

In December 2020, Pellman and DeBose launched the Unruly Hearts Initiative. The initiative was created to help young people connect with organisations and charities that advocate for the LGBTQ+ community.

== Personal life ==
Pellman is queer, and came out to her mother, who herself is gay, in her final year of high school. She became engaged to filmmaker Brydie O'Connor on November 23, 2023, and married in November 2025.

== Filmography ==
=== Television ===
| Year | Title | Role | Notes |
|---|---|---|---|
| 2019 | Alternatino with Arturo Castro | | Episode: "La Pulga" |
| 2019 | The University | Mary Brandt | Episode: "Silences" |
| 2019 | The Deuce | Bree | Episode: "This Trust Thing" |
| 2019 | The Marvelous Mrs. Maisel | Girl #2 | Episode: "It's Comedy or Cabbage" |
| 2022-2025 | 1923 | Jennifer | 3 episodes |

=== Film ===
| Year | Title | Role | Notes |
|---|---|---|---|
| 2020 | The Prom | Emma Nolan | Film debut |
| 2023 | Tripped Up | Ashley | |

== Awards and nominations ==
| Year | Association | Category | Nominated work | Result | Ref. |
|---|---|---|---|---|---|
| 2020 | Hollywood Critics Association | Star on the Rise | The Prom | Won | |
