= Caitlin Kinnunen =

American actress

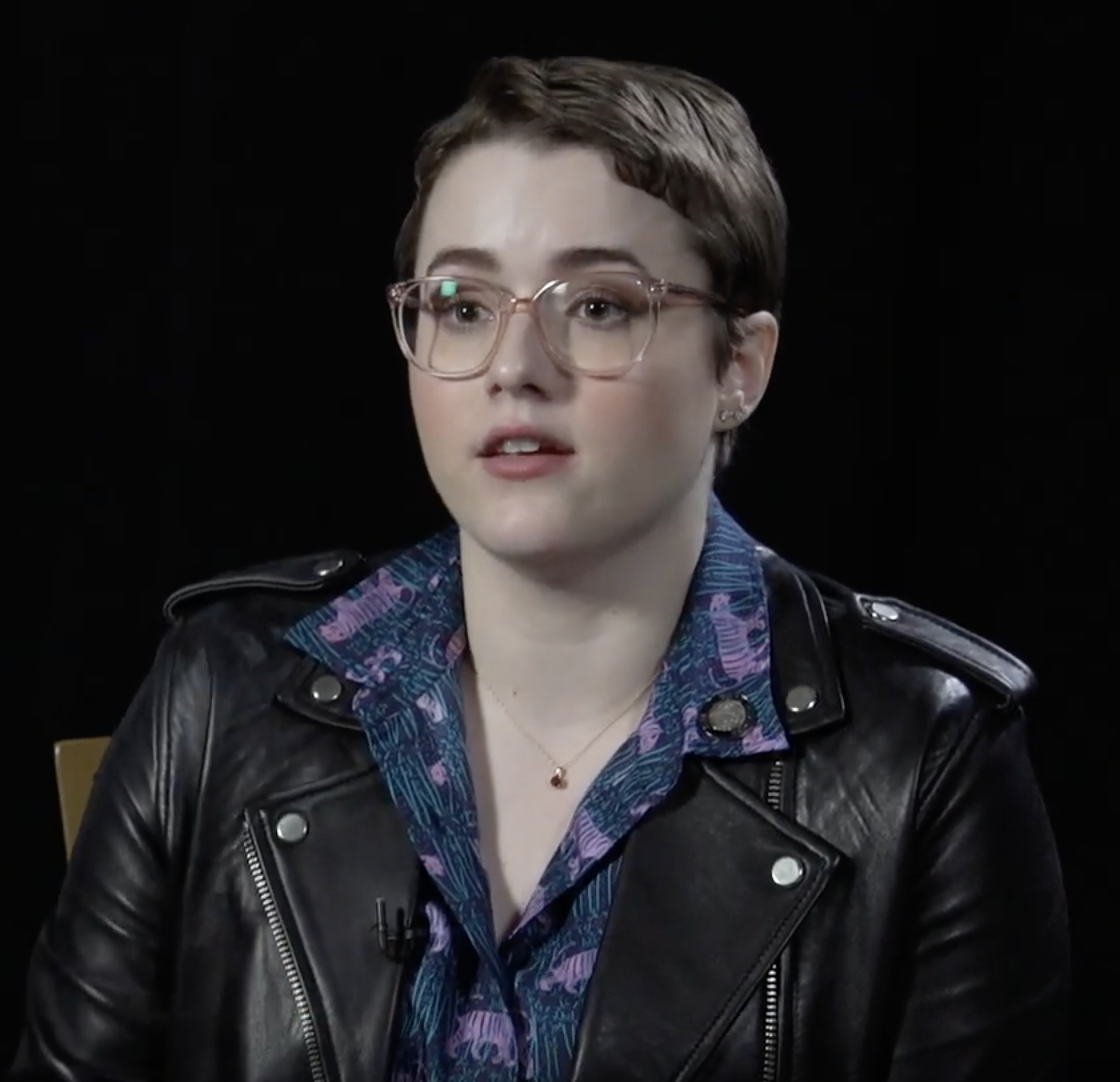
- Kinnunen in 2019
- Born: November 8, 1991 (age 34); Washington, U.S.
- Occupation: Actress
- Years active: 2008–present
- Website: caitlinkinnunen.com

Caitlin Kinnunen (born November 8, 1991) is an American actress. She is best known for playing Emma Nolan in the musical The Prom, for which she was nominated for a Tony Award for Best Actress in a Musical in 2019.

== Early life and education ==
Kinnunen grew up in Camano Island, Washington. Her parents are Betsy Stam, an administrator at Everett Community College and Randy Kinnunen, a former law enforcement agent. She was homeschooled. Her parents enrolled her and her sister in theatre classes as children so they would not be afraid of public speaking.

She moved to New York in 2008 to pursue her theatre career.

== Acting career ==
Kinnunen made her Broadway debut at age 16, as a replacement for the role of Thea in Spring Awakening. In 2010, Kinnunen was the understudy for the role of Natalie in the national tour of Next to Normal.

Following these theater performances, Kinnunen took on a number of television and film roles. She was the lead character in the film Sweet Little Lies in 2011 and a minor character in It's Kind of a Funny Story, We Need to Talk About Kevin, and The Intern.

She was next seen in the 2013 pre-Broadway performances of The Bridges of Madison County as Carolyn, and she continued the role when the production moved to Broadway the following year. The show closed on May 18, 2014, after 137 performances.

In 2014, Kinnunen auditioned for the role of Alyssa in a reading for The Prom. She ultimately was cast as the lead character, Emma Nolan, and went on to perform the role in Atlanta in 2016, before the show moved to Broadway in 2018. For this performance, she was nominated for a Tony Award for Best Performance by a Leading Actress in a Musical. Kinnunen and co-star Isabelle McCalla's kiss during their performance at the 2018 Macy's Thanksgiving Day Parade made national news as the first LGBT kiss in the parade's history. The production closed on August 11, 2019, after 23 previews and 309 regular performances.

In May 2024, Kinnunen originated a lead role in the play Choice by Winnie Holzman at McCarter Theatre Center in New Jersey.

In December 2025, Kinnunen began starring as Margaret Crane, inventor of the home pregnancy test, in an Off-Broadway production of Predictor, a play by Jennifer Blackmer about Crane's life.

== Personal life ==
In 2019, in an interview for Nylon, Kinnunen announced, after years of identifying as a straight ally, that she was dating a woman. She has since come out as bisexual/queer.

She has type 1 diabetes.

== Acting credits ==
=== Film ===
Year	Title	Role	Notes
2010	It's Kind of a Funny Story	Science Geek	
2011	We Need to Talk About Kevin	Student	
2011	Sweet Little Lies	Bess	Lead role
2012	Legacy	Claire	Short film
2015	The Intern	Techie #2	
2022	You're the Best	Emmy	Short film

=== Television ===
Year	Network	Title	Role	Notes
2009	Law & Order: SVU	Amy Wagner	Episode: "Turmoil"	
2015	The Knick	Suzy	Episode: "Whiplash"	
2017	American Vandal	Anonymous Student	Episode: "Nailed"	
2017	Younger	Heidi	Episode: "Post Truth"	
2021	Our Ladies Of Brooklyn	Sister Frances	Episode: Pilot	Lead role

=== Theatre ===
Year(s)	Production	Role	Location	Category
2008	Spring Awakening	Thea (replacement)	Eugene O'Neill Theater	Broadway
2010	Next to Normal	Natalie (understudy)	National Tour	Regional
2013	The Bridges of Madison County	Carolyn	Williamstown Theatre Festival	Out-of-town tryout
2014	The Bridges of Madison County	Carolyn	Gerald Schoenfeld Theatre	Broadway
2016	The Prom	Emma Nolan	Alliance Theatre	Regional
2018	Fun Home	Medium Allison	Weston Playhouse	Regional
2018-19	The Prom	Emma Nolan	Longacre Theatre	Broadway
2021-22	Rescue Rue	Alex	Daryl Roth Theatre	Off-Broadway
2022	Jesus Christ Superstar	Mary Magdalene	ACT of Connecticut	Regional
2022	The Magnificent Seven	Jaycie Phelps	Theatre Row	Off-Broadway
2024	Choice	Zoe/Leah or Lena	McCarter Theatre	Regional
2025-26	Predictor	Meg Crane (Margaret Crane)	AMT Theater	Off-Broadway

== Awards and nominations ==
Year	Award	Category	Nominated work	Result	Ref.
2019	20th Broadway.com Audience Choice Awards	Favorite Leading Actress in a Musical	The Prom	Nominated	
2019	20th Broadway.com Audience Choice Awards	Favorite Onstage Pair (with Isabelle McCalla)	The Prom	Nominated	
2019	73rd Tony Awards	Best Actress in a Musical	The Prom	Nominated	
