= Chad Beguelin =

American playwright and lyricist

- Born: September 24, 1969 (age 56)
- Education: Tisch School of the Arts (MFA)
- Occupations: Playwright and lyricist

Chad Beguelin (born September 24, 1969) is an American playwright and lyricist. He wrote the lyrics and co-wrote the book for The Prom. He also wrote the book for Disney's Aladdin, as well as additional lyrics for the score. He was nominated for Best Original Book and Best Original Score for Aladdin. He is also known for his collaborations with composer Matthew Sklar, having written the lyrics and co-written the book for the Broadway musical The Wedding Singer and the lyrics for the Broadway musical Elf the Musical. Beguelin was nominated for two Tony Awards for his work on The Wedding Singer, as well as a Drama Desk Award for Outstanding Lyrics.

== Biography ==
Beguelin, a native of Centralia, Illinois, received an MFA from the graduate writing program at New York University's Tisch School of the Arts.

Beguelin wrote the book and lyrics for The Rhythm Club which was produced at the Signature Theatre, Arlington, Virginia in 2000 and was nominated for a Helen Hayes Award. He wrote the book and lyrics for Wicked City, which was produced at the American Stage Company and the Mason Street Warehouse, Saugatuck, Michigan, in 2004. He wrote the books for Disney's Aladdin and On the Record.

As a screenwriter, Beguelin sold a script to Grammnet Productions and also worked as a staff writer for Disney's live action film department in California.

Beguelin wrote the book and lyrics for Elf the Musical, based on the 2003 film Elf. The musical premiered at the Center Theatre Group in Los Angeles in 2010 before opening on Broadway at the Al Hirschfeld Theatre in November 2010. Originally directed and choreographed by Matt Williams, the show has since returned to Broadway for the holiday season in 2012, and 2024, the latter which starred Grey Henson as Buddy the Elf.

Casey Nicholaw directed and choreographed the stage musical Aladdin which ran at the 5th Avenue Theatre, Seattle, Washington, July 7–31, 2011. The musical uses songs from the 1992 film Aladdin, with a new book by Beguelin and new lyrics by Beguelin and Alan Menken. The musical opened on Broadway on March 20, 2014, at the New Amsterdam Theatre.

Beguelin made his Off-Broadway playwrighting debut with Harbor, directed by Mark Lamos, presented by Primary Stages, from August 6, 2013, to September 8, 2013. Harbor had its world premiere at the Westport Country Playhouse, Westport, Connecticut, from August 2012 to September 15, 2012, directed by Mark Lamos.

Beguelin and Bob Martin wrote the book for a new musical based on the film Gotta Dance, titled Half Time, with music by Matthew Sklar and lyrics by Nell Benjamin, with additional music by Marvin Hamlisch. Directed and choreographed by Jerry Mitchell, the musical premiered at the Bank of America Theatre in Chicago on December 13, 2015, running through January 17, 2016. It had originally been expected to open on Broadway in the Fall of 2016, and then for the Spring of 2017. The musical instead opened at the Paper Mill Playhouse, Millburn, New Jersey on May 31, 2018. The cast stars André De Shields, Georgia Engel, Donna McKechnie, and Lillias White.

He wrote the book with Bob Martin and lyrics for a new musical The Prom, with music by Matthew Sklar based on an original concept by Jack Viertel. The musical premiered at the Alliance Theatre, Atlanta, Georgia on August 18, 2016, in previews, directed by Casey Nicholaw. The musical opened on Broadway at the Longacre Theatre on November 15, 2018, with previews starting on October 23, 2018.

== Stage credits ==
Year	Title	Role	Venue	Ref.
2000	The Rhythm Club	Book, Lyrics	Regional, Signature Theatre	
2004	Wicked City	Book, Lyrics	Regional, Mason Street Warehouse	
2004	On The Record	Book	U.S. National Tour	
2006	The Wedding Singer	Book, Lyrics	Broadway, Al Hirschfeld Theatre	
2010	All About Me	Additional numbers	Broadway, Henry Miller's Theatre	
2010	Elf	Lyrics	Regional, Center Theatre Group	
2010	Elf	Lyrics	Broadway, Al Hirschfeld Theatre	
2011	Aladdin	Book, additional lyrics	Regional, 5th Avenue Theatre	
2012	Elf	Lyrics	Broadway, Al Hirschfeld Theatre	
2012	Harbor	Playwright	Regional, Westport Country Playhouse	
2013	Harbor	Playwright	Off-Broadway, Primary Stages	
2014	Aladdin	Book, additional lyrics	Broadway, New Amsterdam Theatre	
2015	Half Time	Book	Regional, Bank of America Theatre	
2016	The Prom	Book, Lyrics	Regional, Alliance Theatre	
2018	The Prom	Book, Lyrics	Broadway, Longacre Theatre	
2018	Half Time	Book	Regional, Paper Mill Playhouse	
2024	Elf	Lyrics	Broadway, Marquis Theatre	

== Awards and honors ==
Award	Year	Category	Work	Result	Ref.
Tony Awards	2006	Best Original Score	The Wedding Singer	Nominated	
Tony Awards	2006	Best Book of a Musical	The Wedding Singer	Nominated	
Tony Awards	2014	Best Original Score	Aladdin	Nominated	
Tony Awards	2014	Best Book of a Musical	Aladdin	Nominated	
Tony Awards	2019	Best Original Score	The Prom	Nominated	
Tony Awards	2019	Best Book of a Musical	The Prom	Nominated	
Drama Desk Awards	2006	Outstanding Lyrics	The Wedding Singer	Nominated	
Drama Desk Awards	2014	Outstanding Lyrics	Aladdin	Nominated	
Drama Desk Awards	2014	Outstanding Book of a Musical	Aladdin	Nominated	
Drama Desk Awards	2019	Outstanding Book of a Musical	The Prom	Nominated	
Drama Desk Awards	2019	Outstanding Lyrics	The Prom	Nominated	

== Personal life ==
Beguelin currently lives in Manhattan and Bridgehampton with his husband Tom and their dog Tucker.
