= The Wedding Singer (musical) =

2006-2017 musical based on 1998 film of same name

- Original Cast Recording
- Music: Matthew Sklar (new songs); Adam Sandler (original two songs); Tim Herlihy (original two songs)
- Lyrics: Chad Beguelin (new songs); Adam Sandler (original two songs); Tim Herlihy (original two songs)
- Book: Chad Beguelin; Tim Herlihy
- Basis: The Wedding Singer by Tim Herlihy
- Productions: 2006 Broadway; 2007 US tour 2008 UK tour 2009 US tour 2017 UK tour

The Wedding Singer is a musical with music by Matthew Sklar, lyrics by Chad Beguelin, and a book by Beguelin and Tim Herlihy. It is based on the 1998 film of the same name. The musical revolves around Robbie, who sings at weddings, his failed relationship with his former fiancée, and his romance with a new love, Julia.

The musical premiered on Broadway in 2006 and had several US tours starting in 2007. It was nominated for the 2006 Tony Award for Best Musical. It subsequently has had many international productions.

== Synopsis ==
=== Act 1 ===
Robbie Hart, a wedding singer, lives with his Grandma Rosie in Ridgefield, New Jersey. He and his band play a great wedding gig ("It’s Your Wedding Day"). During his usual "warm-up-the-crowd routine," Robbie proudly announces that he will be married to his beloved fiancée Linda the next day. At the wedding gig, Robbie meets a waitress named Julia Sullivan, who can't wait to get married ("Someday"). Afterward, Robbie tries to write a sweet (eventually corny) love song to Linda, with help from Julia, whom he had just met during the previous wedding ("Awesome"). The following day, however, Linda dumps Robbie at the altar, with only a note claiming that she wants to be the wife of a rock star and not just a wedding singer ("A Note from Linda"). Meanwhile, an anxious Julia goes out to dinner with her Wall Street banker boyfriend, Glen Guglia, hoping he will pop the question, which he does ("Pop!").

Robbie falls into a deep depression ("Somebody Kill Me"), but is urged by his bandmates Sammy and George, and even his grandmother ("A Note from Grandma"), to use that intense emotion to get back on his feet. However, the angry Robbie does nothing but enrage the guests at the next wedding gig ("Casualty of Love"), and he is soon thrown into the dumpster by the groom and an angry crowd of wedding guests. With some convincing from his friend Julia, Robbie does "Come Out of the Dumpster," but changes his singing gigs strictly to bar mitzvahs ("Today You Are a Man"). After the Shapiro bar mitzvah ("George’s Prayer"), Julia convinces Robbie to help her register for her wedding, as her fiancé Glen is, as usual, busy with business-related affairs ("Not That Kind of Thing").

While at the mall, Robbie and Julia meet up with Julia's cousin and best friend Holly, who convinces the "faux duo" that Julia needs to practice her wedding kiss. Robbie and Julia awkwardly and lovingly kiss, only to be interrupted by the reality that Julia is marrying Glen. After seeing the kiss, Holly decides that she should go out with Robbie. Julia, still shocked by the kiss, hastily agrees with Holly. Much later that night, Robbie, Holly, Julia, Glen, Sammy, and George go to a club in New York City ("Saturday Night in the City"). Here Robbie finally realizes that Glen is a cheater and that he, Robbie, loves Julia. Holly realizes this too and tells Robbie that Julia is marrying Glen because of his money and security. Upon hearing this, Robbie says, "Well, I‘m in big trouble, then. But maybe I could change."

=== Act 2 ===
The next morning, Robbie visits Glen at his Wall Street office to get a job and learn how to be like him in order to secretly impress Julia ("All About the Green"). Later, Julia and Holly recall the events of the night before and Julia begins to question if rich men are truly better people ("Someday - Reprise"). Sammy arrives and tries to woo Holly, but is given the cold shoulder, but Holly can't help but feel that despite his flaws, there is no other man who could replace Sammy ("Right in Front of Your Eyes"). Later in the evening, a "Glenified" Robbie finds Julia at his doorstep and tries to woo her. When that doesn't work, he accuses her of marrying Glen for his material possessions. Julia is stung and walks away from Robbie, throwing a present in his face: personalized blank sheet music. After all, Julia truly cares about Robbie and wants him to sing at weddings again, especially her own.

Robbie realizes what he's done and drinks his sorrows away at a local bar ("All About the Green - Reprise"). Sammy and George go to the bar and try to convince Robbie that staying "Single" is the right thing to do. Inadvertently, Sammy and George end up persuading Robbie into going to Julia's house to tell her how he really feels. Meanwhile, at Julia's house, Julia is with her mother, Angie, trying on her wedding dress, but is having doubts about marrying Glen because of recent events with her and Robbie. Julia's mother reassures her that Glen really is "Mr. Right" and questions why Julia would leave him for a wedding singer. But Julia still has doubts. Robbie looks into Julia's window and sees her trying on her wedding dress and smiling at her reflection. He thinks it's because she's marrying Glen, but Julia is smiling only because she's imagining being Robbie's wife ("If I Told You"). Robbie comes across Glen in the middle of a bachelor party. Glen invites Robbie, but Robbie simply begs him not to cheat on Julia anymore. Glen gets defensive and condemns Robbie. Robbie gets knocked down and Glen fires him. Robbie goes home drunk and dazed only to find Linda in his bed, wanting him back ("Let Me Come Home"). Before she can fully apologize Robbie falls into a deep slumber.

The next day, Julia goes to Robbie's house to tell him how she really feels, only to find Linda instead. This scares Julia into eloping with Glen to Las Vegas. Meanwhile, Robbie wakes up and promptly kicks Linda (the "psycho") out. At Grandma Rosie's 50th anniversary party, Robbie finds out from Holly what happened to Julia. Only then do Robbie and Julia realize that they may never see each other again, and they may never get to tell each other what's on their minds ("Not That Kind of Thing / If I Told You - Reprise").

With urging from his grandmother and Sammy, Robbie goes to the airport and gets on the next plane to Vegas ("Move That Thang"). With the help of a group of Vegas impersonators (Billy Idol, Mr. T, Ronald Reagan, Tina Turner, Cyndi Lauper, Nancy Reagan, and Imelda Marcos), Robbie crashes Julia's and Glen's wedding at the Little White House Chapel and sings his new song to Julia ("Grow Old With You"). Glen is outraged that Robbie and Julia still have feelings for each other and blurts out that he cheated on Julia with "like a hundred other women." Upon hearing this, the impersonators beat Glen up, and Robbie proposes to Julia. She says yes, on one condition: "Will you sing at my wedding?" The answer is a resounding "Yes!" Later, (Mr.) Robbie Hart and (Mrs.) Julia Sullivan-Hart are wed ("Finale").

== Production history ==
US

The stage musical version of The Wedding Singer had its world premiere with a limited run pre-Broadway engagement at the 5th Avenue Theatre in Seattle. Opening 8 February 2006 (with previews as of 31 January), the 5th Avenue engagement ended with a 19 February 2006 performance.

Al Hirschfeld Theater performance review
in The New York Times 28 April 2006
Something Borrowed, Something Renewed: The Return of the '80s in 'The Wedding Singer
How quickly our dreary yesterdays become bright, cute and endlessly repackageable. The 1980s, it seems, are to today what the 1950s were to the 1970s (and to part of the 1980s): a supposedly more innocent, picturesquely dopey time when people wore quaint clothes, listened to infectiously inane music and danced goofy tribal dances. Ah, how we laughed.

Hence the return of big hair and shoulders to fashion's runways; the preponderance of Web sites with names like "inthe80s.com"; and animated television scrapbooks, like "I Love the '80s" on VH1, where third-tier celebrities provide snarky commentary about their favorite period bands, movies and celebrities. And now, mining the same much-plundered vein, is "The Wedding Singer," the assembly-kit musical that opened last night at the Al Hirschfeld Theater and might as well be called "That 80's Show."

This transformation of a Hollywood movie into a Broadway musical, a trend that appears as irreversible as global warming, is an example of recycled recycling, or second-hand nostalgia. The film "The Wedding Singer," which became a big hit, thanks largely to its romantic leads, Adam Sandler and Drew Barrymore, was also set in the mid-1980s, but it was made in the late 1990s. Remember the 1990s? Ah, how we laughed. Would that we could recapture the charm and innocence of how we looked at the 1980s in those days.

In fairness, "The Wedding Singer" - which features songs by Matthew Sklar and Chad Beguelin and a book by Tim Herlihy (who also wrote the screenplay for the movie) and Mr. Beguelin - is hardly a low point in a Broadway season that has given us "Lennon," "In My Life" and "Lestat." True, it consists of little more than winks and nods and quotations. Entire stretches of dialogue are composed of titles of vintage songs, which are imitated as dutifully as copyright law allows in Mr. Sklar's pastiche score. And Rob Ashford's choreography is replete with literal-minded tributes to 1980s music videos for era-defining songs like "Thriller," "Material Girl" and "Flashdance."

But the show has at least a flutter of a hedonist's pulse. And if its formulaic catering to an established public appetite feels cynical, the cast members exude earnestness and good nature. They are a personable enough lot, which is not the same as saying that they have personality.

For, as so often happens when good (or even not-so-good) films turn into stage shows, the first things to be jettisoned are sharp edges and authentically quirky characters. (Decades ago, when Broadway still had a mind of its own, the same process occurred when stage shows were made into Hollywood musicals.) I need utter only three words to make my case: "Saturday Night Fever."

The plot of this "Wedding Singer," directed with bland peppiness by John Rando, sticks closely to that of the movie. The title character, Robbie Hart (played here by Stephen Lynch), is a would-be rock star who makes do by fronting a band that plays wedding receptions in Ridgefield, N.J. He's good at his job because he's in love with love and the notion of happily ever after—that is, until he is left standing at the altar by his skanky fiancée (the enjoyably trashy Felicia Finley). His only hope of salvation lies in the form of Julia Sullivan (Laura Benanti), a sweet, clumsy waitress who unfortunately already has a boyfriend, a Wall Street junk bonds whiz kid (Richard H. Blake).

It's a wispy plot, even by the standards of romantic comedy. What made the movie more or less bearable was Mr. Sandler, a king of low comedy, subduing his frat-house instincts to create a surprisingly gentle portrait of a loser. Plus there was the dewier-than-daybreak Ms. Barrymore, who managed to make even vomit jokes smell like roses. (The vomit jokes, by the way, have been nixed for the stage version. The four-letter words remain.) Neither Mr. Lynch nor Ms. Benanti, though obviously gifted, shows much original presence here. Mr. Lynch is best known as a performer of self-subverting comic songs that move from conventional prettiness to shock-effect humor. This would seem to make him a natural replacement for Mr. Sandler.

But while Mr. Lynch is charming as Robbie in an angry or depressed mood (he does especially well by the two oddball songs retained from the movie, written by Mr. Sandler with Mr. Herlihy), he is more often called upon to be appealingly boyish, bringing to mind a less vain, less glib Ryan Seacrest. Ms. Benanti, a dark-haired enchantress in the revival of "Into the Woods," goes Barrymore blond for "The Wedding Singer" and winds up looking like that sharp-featured beacon of on-screen efficiency, Helen Hunt. This Julia has a shrewd, calculating look that makes her less than convincing as a starry-eyed klutz.

On the other hand, characterization is clearly secondary in "The Wedding Singer," which is why a supporting cast stocked with sui generis talents tends to turn into a pasteboard parade. That includes Amy Spanger (a standout in the revival of "Kiss Me, Kate") as Julia's cousin, a Madonna wannabe; Kevin Cahoon (the Childcatcher in "Chitty Chitty Bang Bang") as a member of Robbie's band and a Boy George wannabe; and Rita Gardner (the -gasp! - original Girl in "The Fantasticks") as a sweet little old grandmother who raps, break-dances and talks dirty.

Despite these performers' game efforts, most of their characters feel only a hair's breadth away from the posse of celebrity impersonators (dressed up as Billy Idol, Cyndi Lauper, Tina Turner, Ronald Reagan and Imelda Marcos, among others) who are rounded up for the show's climax in a Las Vegas wedding chapel. Only the excellent Matthew Saldivar, as Robbie's best friend (a Van Halen wannabe), registers as a bona fide character, authentically defined by his time and place.

That place, of course, is Ridgefield, which has been reconstructed with affectionate cartoon tackiness in Scott Pask's sets. (Gregory Gale's even tackier costumes should by rights single-handedly put a stop to an 80's revival in fashion.) "The Wedding Singer" makes no bones about appealing directly to nearby out-of-towners. "New York is reserved for the rich and proud,/ But here comes the bridge and tunnel crowd," sings the ensemble in a number set in a Manhattan disco.

But Jerseyphilia must take a back seat to the show's broader raison d'être: to create a singing, dancing version of "Trivial Pursuit: '80s Edition." This ambition filters through sight gags (Julia's fiancé totes a cellphone with an oversized battery and drives a DeLorean with a license plate that says "XMAS BONUS") and little-did-we-know jokes about subjects like Starbucks and the New Coke.

It says everything about this musical's priorities that it brings down its first-act curtain not on a suspenseful or emotional moment between Robbie and Julia but on the image of a scantily dressed woman in profile in a chair (Ms. Spanger) being doused with a bucket of water. If that image doesn't make you think "What a feeling!," then "The Wedding Singer" is probably not your show. Ben Brantley

The musical opened on Broadway at the Al Hirschfeld Theatre on 27 April 2006 (with previews as of 30 March) and closed on 31 December 2006 after 284 performances. It was directed by John Rando, with choreography by Rob Ashford, and featured Stephen Lynch as Robbie.

The first national tour had a preview performance on August 31, 2007, at the Curtis M. Phillips Center in Gainesville, Florida, and opened September 4, at the Birmingham–Jefferson Convention Complex in Birmingham, Alabama. After playing 31 cities, the tour closed at Harrah's in Atlantic City, New Jersey, on August 31, 2008. Paul Stancato directed the tour based on the original Broadway direction by John Rando, and Chris Bailey provided choreography, which was based on Rob Ashford's Broadway work. The creative team also included John Mezzio (musical supervisor/coordinator/conductor), Scott Pask (scenic designer), Brian MacDevitt (lighting designer), Gregory Gale (costume designer) and Lucas J. Corrubia, Jr. (sound designer). Merritt David Janes played Robbie.

A different touring production of the show opened on September 28, 2009 in Fayetteville, Arkansas, at the Walton Arts Center. It continued until March 28, 2010, ending in New Haven, Connecticut, at the Shubert Theatre, having traveled throughout the US and Canada. This production was produced by Prather Entertainment Group and directed by Seth Reines, with choreography by Amy McCleary.

The show has become a popular show among community theaters and high schools.

UK

A UK tour opened at the Manchester Palace Theatre in February 2008 starring Jonathan Wilkes as Robbie and Natalie Casey as Julia, and toured the UK through July 2008.

The Curve performance review
in The Stage 16 February 2017
Even the title promises songs: adapting the 1997 film The Wedding Singer was a natural fit for a Broadway musical. And so it proves. The amiable pastiche elisions of composer Matthew Sklar's bubblegum, intentionally retro-feeling pop score feel like an amalgam of 1980s sounds from Manilow to Boy George, Billy Idol, Cyndi Lauper and Tina Turner (the last three of whom turn up in a parade of Vegas impersonators).

It also lends itself naturally to musical comedy, with Chad Beguelin joining the original screenwriter Tim Herlihy to adapt its plot of boy-ditched-at-altar and girl-ditches-another-boy-at-wedding-chapel into a sly if rather obvious portrait of heterosexual mating rituals. But as played with an effortlessly straight (if not always straight-faced) swagger in Nick Winston's energetic, enjoyable production, the show occupies a place somewhere between Legally Blonde and the pastiche guitar rock flavours of School of Rock.

Jon Robyns lends the title character wit and vulnerability in equal measure, in which he finds himself jilted but still having to entertain happy couples celebrating their wedding day. Robyns has long been a West End stalwart but here he happily moves into a league of leading players in the Killian Donnelly mould of seemingly unassuming men who have powerhouse singing, acting and dancing credentials. He is also appealingly partnered by Cassie Compton as the woman he falls in love with, while former Brookside actor (and sometime X Factor runner-up) Ray Quinn is also maturing into playing a cockily confident love rat.

As so often nowadays, the establishing of place and time depends on video projections, but a frame of large light boxes around the stage contains the action neatly. -Mark Shenton

A production of The Wedding Singer helmed by director Nick Winston had its premiere run at the Curve Theater (Leicester) 9 – 18 February 2017 and is scheduled to play a total of 33 UK venues from February to October 2017. This production features Jon Robyns as Robbie, Ruth Madoc as Grandma Rosie, Ray Quinn as Glen, Cassie Compton as Julia, Roxanne Pallett as Holly, Ashley Emerson as Sammy, Samuel Holmes as George, and Tara Verloop as Linda. Lucie Jones was announced as Pallett's replacement as Holly in May 2017. Stephanie Clift will play Holly at the venues that Lucie is not.

The same production opened for a Limited run at the Troubadour Wembley Park Theatre from the 30th January to the 1st March 2020. This production featured Kevin Clifton as Robbie, Sandra Dickinson as Grandma Rosie, Rhiannon Chesterman as Julia, Andrew Carthy as George, Ashley Emerson as Sammy, Erin Bell as Linda, Jonny Fines as Glen, Tara Verloop as Holly. The cast was completed by Aimee Moore, Andy Brady, Ellie Seaton, Jordan Crouch, Lori Haley Fox, Morgan Jackson, Nathan Ryles, Paris Green, Simon Anthony, and Vanessa Grace Lee. Featuring Ben Cracknell's lighting design helmed by Production Electrician Chris Vaughn and Followspotted by Dan Heesem and Paul Jennings.

International

El Rey de Bodas, the Spanish-language version (which translates as "The King of Weddings"), played in Madrid in 2007, starring Naim Thomas as Robbie, María Virumbrales as Julia and María Adamuz as Holly.

The Japanese version ran in Tokyo at the Nissay Theatre in 2008.

The South Australian premiere was in 2008 at the Arts Theatre, Adelaide.

The Philippine production ran at the Meralco Theater in 2010. The show starred Gian Magdangal.

The debut German-language production played at Theater im Neukloster in Wiener Neustadt, Austria, in 2011. The first production in Germany played in 2012 at the Waldbühne Kloster Oesede in Georgsmarienhütte.

In 2015, a Spanish-language version was presented in Mexico by Britstudio Artes Escénicas at Teatro Carlos Lazo.

In 2022, Australian productions took place in Sydney, Melbourne and Perth.

== Original cast and characters ==
Character	Broadway (2006)
Robbie Hart	Stephen Lynch
Julia Sullivan	Laura Benanti
Holly	Amy Spanger
Sammy	Matthew Saldivar
Linda	Felicia Finley
Glen Guglia	Richard H. Blake
George Stitzer	Kevin Cahoon
Rosie	Rita Gardner
Angie	Adinah Alexander

== Musical numbers ==
Act I

- "It's Your Wedding Day" – Robbie, Sammy, George, and Company
- "Someday" – Julia and Female Ensemble
- "Awesome" – Robbie and Julia
- "Someday (Robbie's Reprise)" – Robbie
- "A Note from Linda" – Linda
- "It's Your Wedding Day (Reprise 1)" – Robbie
- "Pop!" – Holly, Angie, Julia, and Company *
- "Somebody Kill Me" (music and lyrics by Tim Herlihy and Adam Sandler) – Robbie
- "A Note from Grandma" – Rosie
- “It’s Your Wedding Day (Reprise 2)” – Robbie and Wedding Guests
- "Casualty of Love" – Robbie, Sideburns Lady, Loser Guy, Large Lady, and Company
- "Come Out of the Dumpster" – Julia and Robbie
- "Today You Are a Man" – Robbie, George, and Sammy
- "George's Prayer" – George
- "Not That Kind of Thing" – Robbie, Julia, and Company
- "Saturday Night in the City" – Company

Act II

- "All About the Green" – Glen, Robbie, and Company
- "Someday (Julia's Reprise)" – Julia
- "Right in Front of Your Eyes" – Holly and Sammy
- "All About the Green (Reprise)" – Robbie, Bum, and Ricky
- "Single" – Sammy, Ricky, Bum, George, Robbie, and Male Ensemble
- "If I Told You" – Robbie and Julia
- "Let Me Come Home" – Linda
- "Not That Kind of Thing / If I Told You (Reprise)" – Rosie, Robbie, and Julia
- "Move That Thang" – Rosie and George
- "Grow Old With You" (music and lyrics by Adam Sandler and Tim Herlihy) – Robbie and Julia
- "Finale" – Company

*The song "Pop!" was removed for the US national tour because the set pieces for the song were too big. With this plot change, Glen proposes to Julia over the phone instead of at the restaurant in "Pop!"

== Reception ==
Ben Brantley, in his review for The New York Times, wrote "the show has at least a flutter of a hedonist's pulse. And if its formulaic catering to an established public appetite feels cynical, the cast members exude earnestness and good nature. They are a personable enough lot, which is not the same as saying that they have personality. For, as so often happens when good (or even not-so-good) films turn into stage shows, the first things to be jettisoned are sharp edges and authentically quirky characters." He further noted "wispy" plot, Mr. Sklar's "pastiche score", and that "Rob Ashford's choreography is replete with literal-minded tributes to 1980's music videos for era-defining songs like 'Thriller,' 'Material Girl' and 'Flashdance.'"

The Variety reviewer wrote that "Forced as it is, this is a fizzy confection offering enough easy enjoyment to attract the outer boroughs and the tourist trade. It's also derivative by design, to some extent making a virtue of its inherent phoniness via winking acknowledgement. Where the 1998 film ended with a scene featuring '80s icon Billy Idol, the stage adaptation corrals not only an Idol impersonator but a fake Tina Turner, Imelda Marcos, Cyndi Lauper, Mr. T and Ronald Reagan. Retro overkill is a distinct risk here, but one mainstream auds are unlikely to mind."

== Awards and nominations ==
=== Original Broadway production ===
Year	Award Ceremony	Category	Nominee	Result
2006	Tony Award	Best Musical		Nominated
2006	Tony Award	Best Book of a Musical	Chad Beguelin and Tim Herlihy	Nominated
2006	Tony Award	Best Original Score	Matthew Sklar and Chad Beguelin	Nominated
2006	Tony Award	Best Performance by a Leading Actor in a Musical	Stephen Lynch	Nominated
2006	Tony Award	Best Choreography	Rob Ashford	Nominated
2006	Drama Desk Award	Outstanding Musical		Nominated
2006	Drama Desk Award	Outstanding Actor in a Musical	Stephen Lynch	Nominated
2006	Drama Desk Award	Outstanding Featured Actress in a Musical	Amy Spanger	Nominated
2006	Drama Desk Award	Outstanding Choreography	Rob Ashford	Nominated
2006	Drama Desk Award	Outstanding Lyrics	Chad Beguelin	Nominated
2006	Drama Desk Award	Outstanding Music	Matthew Sklar	Nominated
2006	Drama Desk Award	Outstanding Set Design	Scott Pask	Nominated
2006	Drama Desk Award	Outstanding Costume Design	Gregory Gale	Nominated
