= David Berenbaum =

American screenwriter

- Born: Philadelphia, Pennsylvania, U.S.
- Education: Tisch School of the Arts
- Occupation: Screenwriter
- Years active: 2003–present

David Berenbaum is an American screenwriter whose credits include the films Elf (2003), The Haunted Mansion (2003), Zoom (2006), The Spiderwick Chronicles (2008), and Strange Magic (2015).

== Biography ==
Berenbaum was born in Philadelphia, Pennsylvania and is a graduate of the Tisch School of the Arts.

He was hired to write a sequel to Mrs. Doubtfire, however the film's production was cancelled following Robin Williams's 2014 suicide.

== Filmography ==
Writer

- Elf (2003)
- The Haunted Mansion (2003)
- Zoom (2006)
- The Spiderwick Chronicles (2008)
- Strange Magic (2015)

Actor

Year	Title	Role
2003	Elf	Office Co-Worker

As himself

Year	Title	Notes
2004	Film School for Kids	Video documentary short
2013	Greatest Ever Christmas Movies	TV movie documentary
2020	The Holiday Movies That Made Us	Netflix documentary series

Special thanks

- Dark Arc (2004)
