= Casey Nicholaw =

American theatre professional

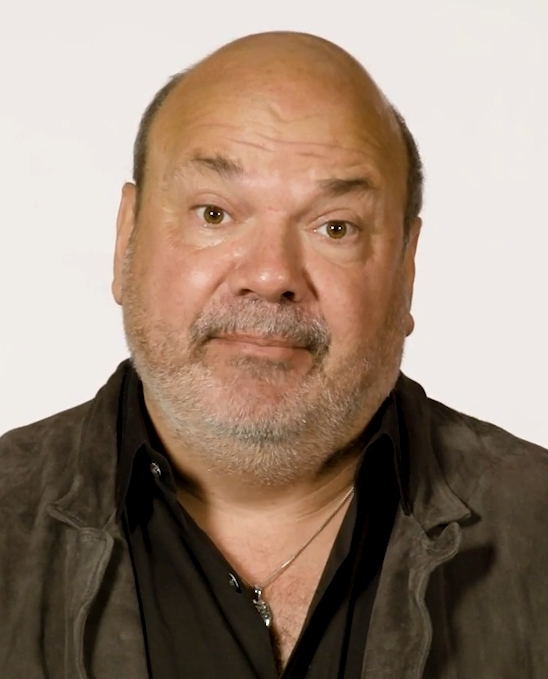
Casey Nicholaw in 2018

Casey Nicholaw (born October 6, 1962) is an American theatre director, choreographer, and performer. He has been nominated for several Tony Awards for his work directing and choreographing The Drowsy Chaperone (2006), The Book of Mormon (2011), Aladdin (2014), Something Rotten! (2015), Mean Girls (2018), The Prom (2019), and Some Like It Hot (2023) and for choreographing Monty Python's Spamalot (2005), winning for his co-direction of The Book of Mormon with Trey Parker and his choreography of Some Like It Hot. He also was nominated for the Drama Desk Awards for Outstanding Direction and Choreography for The Drowsy Chaperone (2006) and Something Rotten! (2015) and for Outstanding Choreography for Spamalot (2005).

== Early life ==
The son of Andy and Kay Nicholaw and the oldest of three children, Nicholaw grew up in San Diego, California, and performed in community theatre there as a teenager. He graduated from Clairemont High School in 1980 and attended the University of California, Los Angeles. He is a nephew of the late George Nicholaw, who was the long time general manager of radio station KNX (AM) in Los Angeles, California.

== Career ==
=== Performer ===
As a performer, Nicholaw played Junior and other roles in Crazy for You (1992–94); played Wall Street Wolf and other roles in The Best Little Whorehouse Goes Public (1994); played Gregor, Juke, and other roles in Victor/Victoria (1995–97); played Corky, Luke, and other roles in Steel Pier (1997); understudied and performed as Neville in The Scarlet Pimpernel (1999); played Frank Manero in Saturday Night Fever (1999–2000); understudied the role of Horton and other roles in Seussical (2000–01); and played Dexter, among other roles, in Thoroughly Modern Millie (2002–04). He can be heard on the cast album of most of these musicals.

His other performance credits include Billion Dollar Baby (Off-Off-Broadway), for a Musicals in Mufti concert (1998) and Bells Are Ringing at the Goodspeed Opera House (1990).

In March 2023, he performed the role of Spats Colombo in Some Like It Hot for a weekend on Broadway.

=== Director and choreographer ===
On Broadway, Nicholaw has directed and choreographed The Drowsy Chaperone (2006), choreographed Spamalot (2005) and directed To Be or Not to Be, which opened October 2, 2008, for the Manhattan Theatre Club. He has been nominated for both Tony Awards and Drama Desk Awards for his Broadway work.

Nicholaw's other choreography credits include Follies for New York City Center's Encores! (Off-Broadway, 2007; he also directed this production); Spamalot's West End production and U.S. national tour (2006); The Drowsy Chaperone in Los Angeles (2005; as director and choreographer); South Pacific at Carnegie Hall (2005); Lucky Duck (Old Globe Theatre, 2004) and Can-Can for Encores! (Off-Broadway, 2004). He also choreographed Bye Bye Birdie (2002) for Encores!; Sinatra: His Voice, His World, His Way at Radio City Music Hall; and Candide for the New York Philharmonic's series of Broadway concerts.

In January 2009, Nicholaw was both director and choreographer of the Los Angeles debut of Minsky's, a musical based on the 1968 film The Night They Raided Minsky's, at the Ahmanson Theatre.

Nicholaw directed and choreographed a new musical, Robin and the 7 Hoods, based on the 1960s Rat Pack film. The musical features songs by Sammy Cahn and Jimmy Van Heusen with a book by Rupert Holmes (replacing Peter Ackerman). The show played at the Old Globe Theatre in San Diego, California, from July 30, 2010, through August, with a cast that featured Will Chase and Amy Spanger.

He is the director and choreographer for the musical Elf: the Musical, which officially opened on Broadway at the Al Hirschfeld Theatre on November 10, 2010, and closed on January 2, 2011. He directed and choreographed the stage musical Aladdin which premiered at the 5th Avenue Theatre in Seattle, Washington, from July 7–31, 2011. The musical uses songs from the 1992 film Aladdin, with a new book by Chad Beguelin and new lyrics by Beguelin and Alan Menken. The show premiered on Broadway at the New Amsterdam Theatre on March 20, 2014.

In 2012, it was announced Nicholaw would direct Animal House: The Musical, which was to have featured an original score by multi-platinum selling band Barenaked Ladies (“One Week,” “Pinch Me”); it was then announced the music would be composed by David Yazbek. Michael Mitnick was to write the libretto for the stage production.

Nicholaw directed and choreographed the new musical Something Rotten!, which opened in previews on Broadway at the St. James Theatre on March 23, 2015, with an official opening on April 22.

He directed and choreographed the West End production of the musical Dreamgirls, which opened officially on December 14, 2016, at the Savoy Theatre.

Nicholaw directed and choreographed The Prom on Broadway, which opened November 15, 2018, at the Longacre Theatre; the musical received a New York Times Critic's Pick.

In 2021, it was announced that Nicolaw would make his film directing debut by helming the film adaptation of Spamalot for Paramount Pictures, with Eric Idle penning the script and Dan Jinks producing. Two years later, Idle said that the film would not be happening.

Nicholaw will direct and choreograph 50 First Dates: The Musical based on the 2004 film at The Other Palace, London in autumn 2025.

== Awards and nominations ==
Year	Award	Category	Work	Result
2005	Tony Award	Best Choreography	Spamalot	Nominated
2005	Drama Desk Award	Outstanding Choreography	Spamalot	Nominated
2005	Outer Critics Circle Award	Outstanding Choreography	Spamalot	Nominated
2006	Tony Award	Best Direction of a Musical	The Drowsy Chaperone	Nominated
2006	Tony Award	Best Choreography	The Drowsy Chaperone	Nominated
2006	Drama Desk Award	Outstanding Director of a Musical	The Drowsy Chaperone	Nominated
2006	Drama Desk Award	Outstanding Choreography	The Drowsy Chaperone	Nominated
2006	Outer Critics Circle Award	Outstanding Choreography	The Drowsy Chaperone	Nominated
2008	Laurence Olivier Award	Best Theatre Choreographer	The Drowsy Chaperone	Nominated
2011	Tony Award	Best Direction of a Musical	The Book of Mormon	Won
2011	Tony Award	Best Choreography	The Book of Mormon	Nominated
2011	Drama Desk Award	Outstanding Director of a Musical	The Book of Mormon	Won
2011	Drama Desk Award	Outstanding Choreography	The Book of Mormon	Nominated
2011	Outer Critics Circle Award	Outstanding Direction of a Musical	The Book of Mormon	Won
2011	Outer Critics Circle Award	Outstanding Choreography	The Book of Mormon	Nominated
2011	Astaire Award	Outstanding Choreographer in a Broadway Show	The Book of Mormon	Nominated
2014	Tony Award	Best Choreography	Aladdin	Nominated
2014	Drama Desk Award	Outstanding Choreography	Aladdin	Nominated
2014	Outer Critics Circle Award	Outstanding Choreography	Aladdin	Nominated
2014	Astaire Award	Outstanding Choreographer in a Broadway Show	Aladdin	Nominated
2014	Laurence Olivier Award	Best Theatre Choreographer	The Book of Mormon	Won
2015	Tony Award	Best Direction of a Musical	Something Rotten!	Nominated
2015	Tony Award	Best Choreography	Something Rotten!	Nominated
2015	Drama Desk Award	Outstanding Director of a Musical	Something Rotten!	Nominated
2015	Drama Desk Award	Outstanding Choreography	Something Rotten!	Nominated
2015	Outer Critics Circle Award	Outstanding Direction of a Musical	Something Rotten!	Nominated
2015	Outer Critics Circle Award	Outstanding Choreography	Something Rotten!	Nominated
2015	Astaire Award	Best Choreographer	Something Rotten!	Nominated
2016	Astaire Award	Outstanding Choreographer in a Broadway Show	Tuck Everlasting	Nominated
2017	Helpmann Awards	Best Choreography in a Musical	The Book of Mormon	Nominated
2017	Helpmann Awards	Best Choreography in a Musical	Aladdin	Nominated
2018	Tony Award	Best Direction of a Musical	Mean Girls	Nominated
2018	Tony Award	Best Choreography	Mean Girls	Nominated
2018	Drama Desk Award	Outstanding Choreography	Mean Girls	Nominated
2018	Outer Critics Circle Award	Outstanding Direction of a Musical	Mean Girls	Nominated
2019	Tony Award	Best Direction of a Musical	The Prom	Nominated
2023	Tony Award	Best Direction of a Musical	Some Like It Hot	Nominated
2023	Tony Award	Best Choreography	Some Like It Hot	Won
2023	Drama Desk Award	Outstanding Choreography	Some Like It Hot	Won
2023	Drama League Award	Outstanding Direction of a Musical	Some Like It Hot	Nominated
2023	Outer Critics Circle Award	Outstanding Direction of a Musical	Some Like It Hot	Nominated
