= Jack Viertel =

American theatrical producer and writer

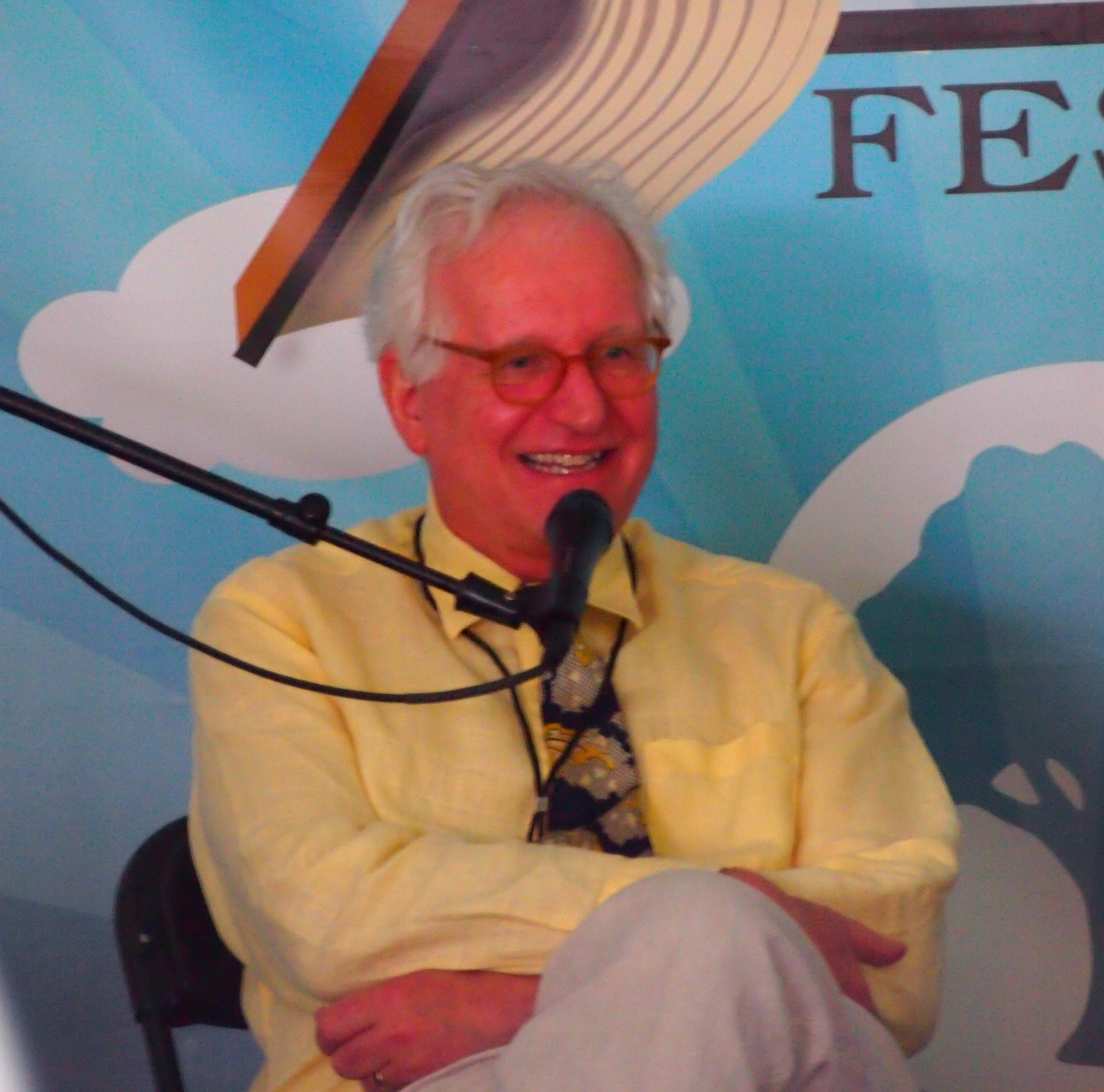
Jack Viertel reading at the 2017 Gaithersburg Book Festival

Jack Viertel is an American theatrical producer and writer. He was born in Stamford, Connecticut. During his 34 years at Jujamcyn Theaters from 1987 to 2021, he occupied positions including Creative Director and Senior Vice President. He was "conceiver of the longest running musical revue in Broadway history, Smokey Joe's Cafe, conceived the critically acclaimed After Midnight, and served as the dramaturg for Hairspray. The musical and movie The Prom were developed from his original concept."

From 2000 to 2020, he was a producer at the Encores! series. Under his tenure, several Encores! productions transferred to Broadway, including After Midnight, The Apple Tree, Finian's Rainbow, and Gypsy.

In 2003, he began lecturing at the New York University Tisch School of the Arts. He developed the content of his music theatre studies course into a book, The Secret Life of the American Musical, published in 2016. Reviews were largely positive, with The New York Times calling it "revelatory and entertaining."

His junebox musical, Let the Good Times Roll, featuring the work of many New Orleans artists, premiered in 2025 at Phoenix Theatre Company and is set to premiere on Broadway in the 2026-2027 season.

== Works ==
- The Secret Life of the American Musical, Farrar, Straus and Giroux, 2016. ISBN 978-0-374-53689-3
- "Broadway Melody", a novel (2024)
- "The Glass Eel," (2025) coauthored with Josh Viertel
- Let the Good Times Roll, (2025) jukebox musical

== Other websites ==
- Broadway Profiles – A Serial Interview with Jack Viertel CTI, April 18, 2019
