= 1st Canadian Comedy Awards =

1999 Canadian comedy awards ceremony

- Date: 6 April 2000
- Location: Masonic Temple; Toronto, Ontario
- Country: Canada
- Presented by: Canadian Comedy Foundation for Excellence
- Hosted by: Dave Thomas

Highlights
- Most wins: This Hour Has 22 Minutes (4); Film: Austin Powers: The Spy Who Shagged Me (2); Person: Mike Myers (3)
- Most nominations: Television: Made in Canada (6); Film: Dog Park and Last Night (3); Play: The Drowsy Chaperone (6); Person: Bob Martin and Mike Meyers (3)
- Website: www.canadiancomedyawards.org

Television/radio coverage
- Network: The Comedy Network

The 1st Canadian Comedy Awards honoured the best Canadian comedy of 1999 in live performances, television and film. The awards ceremony was presented by the Canadian Comedy Foundation for Excellence (CCFE), and was held on 6 April 2000 at the Masonic Temple in Toronto, Ontario. The ceremony was hosted by Dave Thomas. A one-hour version of the ceremony was broadcast late the following night on CTV, and the full program aired on The Comedy Network on 9 April at 9 pm.

Canadian Comedy Awards, also known as Beavers, were awarded in 23 categories. Winners were selected by members of ACTRA (Alliance of Canadian Cinema, Television and Radio Artists), the Canadian Actors' Equity Association, the Writers Guild of Canada, and the Directors Guild of Canada. It was one of the first award presentations to use online voting. The ceremony also marked the creation of the Canadian Comedy Hall of Fame and the induction of its first honourees.

The Drowsy Chaperone and the CBC comedy Made in Canada led the way with six nominations each, followed by Double Exposure, Last Night, and This Hour Has 22 Minutes with five. The big winners were This Hour Has 22 Minutes which won four awards in television, The Drowsy Chaperone which took three awards in live comedy, and Mike Myers who won three in film. Don McKellar won two awards across disciplines: best film director for Last Night and best playwright (together with colleagues Bob Martin, Lisa Lambert and Greg Morrison) for The Drowsy Chaperone.

== Ceremony ==
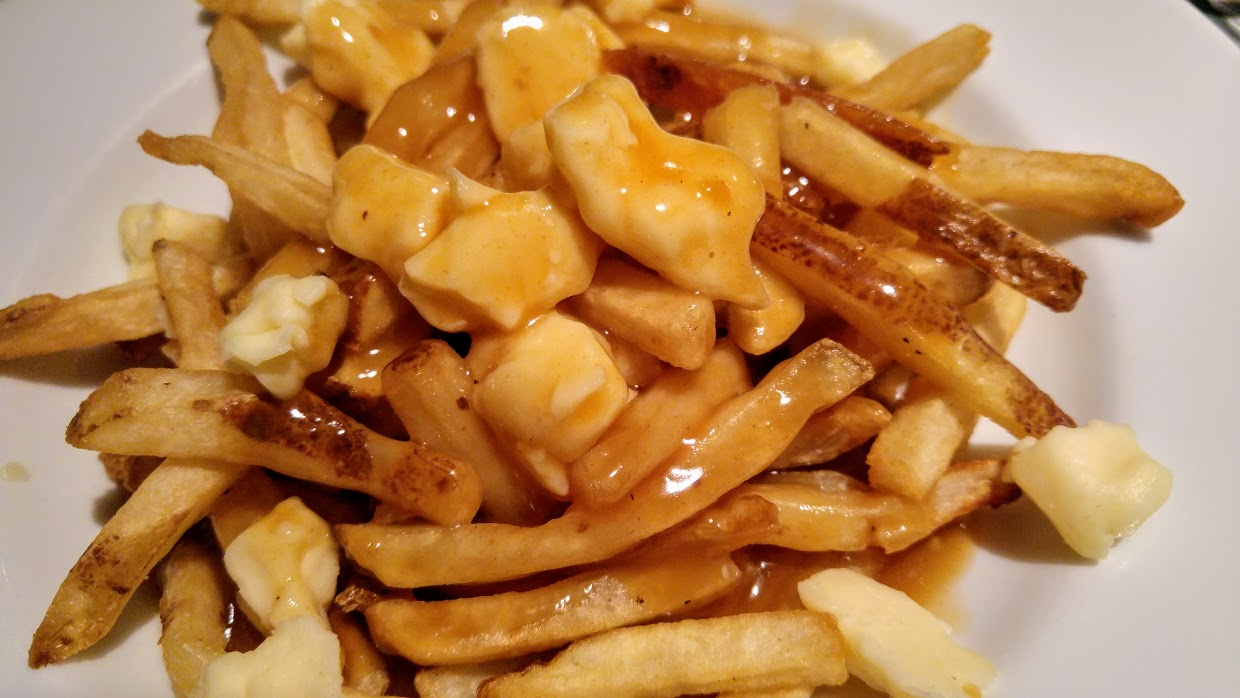
A serving of poutine

The inaugural Canadian Comedy Awards ceremony was held on 6 April 2000 in Toronto, Ontario. The venue was the historic Masonic Temple, home of CTV-affiliate The Comedy Network. The ceremony was hosted by Dave Thomas, a comedic veteran of more than 20 films and 300 sitcom episodes. Thomas is best known for the character Doug McKenzie, a parody of all things Canadian, and the ceremony played on similar humour by serving guests back bacon on a bun and poutine.

== Awards ==
The Beaver was awarded in twenty-three categories recognizing work in live performances, film and television. Winners are listed first and highlighted in boldface:

=== Live ===
Best Stand-up	Best Stand-up Newcomer
**Ron James**; Derek Edwards; Mike Wilmot; Rick Bronson; Scott Harris; Sean Collins	**Wade McElwain**; Frank Spadone; Gavin Stephens; Jason Rouse; Terry McGurrin
Best Male Improviser	Best Female Improviser
**Colin Mochrie**; Albert Howell; Bruce Hunter; Jack Mosshammer; Steve Morel	**Kathy Greenwood**; Jane Luk; Jessica Holmes; Lisa Merchant; Rebecca Northan; Teresa Pavlinek
Best Live Performance – Male	Best Live Performance – Female
**Mump and Smoot** – **Inferno**; Mark Andrada – Co-Ed Prison Sluts; Chris Earle – Radio-30; Bob Martin – The Drowsy Chaperone; Paul O'Sullivan – The Drowsy Chaperone	**Lisa Lambert – The Drowsy Chaperone**; Jessica Holmes – Co-Ed Prison Sluts; Karen Hines – Hello Hello; Melody Johnson – Nude Beach Wear; Shoshana Sperling – The Golden Mile
Best Sketch Troupe or Company	Best New Sketch Troupe
**Skippy's Rangers**; Die Nasty; Pamplemousse; The Bobroom; The Devil's Advocates	**Lolas**; Closet Primadonnas; Dirty Little Secret; Goatee Boys; Kevlor-2000; Rebecca
Best Direction in a New Play	Best Direction in an Existing Play
**Steve Morel – The Drowsy Chaperone**; Bob Martin – 2 Thousand Years; Chris Earle – Hello Hello; Shari Hollett – Radio-30; Sandra Balcovske – The Drowsy Chaperone	**Paul O'Sullivan – Piñata Full of Bees**; Daniel Brooks – Faust; Mark Wilson – That Dorothy Parker; Neil Munroe – You Can't Take it with You
Best Playwriting in a Comedic Play
**Bob Martin, Lisa Lambert, Don McKellar, Greg Morrison – The Drowsy Chaperone**; Charlie Rhindress – A Maritime Way of Life; Karen Hines – Hello Hello; Jonathan Wilson – Kilt; Ronnie Burkett – Street of Blood

=== Television ===
Best Performance by a Male	Best Performance by a Female
**Rick Mercer – Made in Canada**; Sean Cullen – Comedy Now!, "Wood, Cheese & Children"; Bob Robertson – Double Exposure; Albert Howell, Andrew Currie – Improv Heaven and Hell; Peter Keleghan – Made in Canada	**Mary Walsh – This Hour Has 22 Minutes**; Janet van de Graaf – History Bites; Teresa Pavlinek – History Bites; Leah Pinsent – Made in Canada; Ellie Harvie – The New Addams Family; Cathy Jones – This Hour Has 22 Minutes
Best Direction in a Series	Best Direction in a Special or Episode
**Michael Kennedy – Made in Canada**; Nick Orchard – Double Exposure; Henry Sarwer-Foner – Made in Canada; Bruce Pirrie – Supertown Challenge; Mark Lawrence – The 11th Hour	**Henry Sarwer-Foner – This Hour Has 22 Minutes, "New Year's Eve Special"**; Larysa Fenyn – Comics!, "Sean Cullen"; Nick Orchard – Double Exposure, "Swift Kick in Year End"; Brad Birch – Sacrilege Moments; Michael Watt – Thick & Thin
Best Writing in a Series	Best Writing in a Special or Episode
**Tim Steeves, Rick Mercer, Cathy Jones, Edward Kay, Mary Walsh, and Greg Thomey – This Hour Has 22 Minutes**; Bob Robertson, Linda Cullen, and Andrew Gross – Double Exposure; Rick Green, Duncan McKenzie, Amy McKenzie, Eric Lunsky, Danny DiTata, and Jeremy Winkels – History Bites; Rick Mercer – Made in Canada; Don McKellar – Twitch City	**Tim Steeves, Rick Mercer, Cathy Jones, Edward Kay, Mary Walsh, and Greg Thomey – This Hour Has 22 Minutes**; Paul O'Sullivan, Lisa Lambert, Bob Martin, and Jonathan Crombie – Comedy Now!, "The Show They Never Gave"; Sean Cullen – Comedy Now!, "Wood, Cheese & Children"; Lisa Brooke, Shoshana Sperling – Comics!, "Sperling & Brooke"; Gord Holtam, John Morgan, Rick Olsen, and Wayne Testori – Royal Canadian Air Farce, "New Year's Eve Special"

=== Film ===
Best Performance by a Male	Best Performance by a Female
**Mike Myers – Austin Powers: The Spy Who Shagged Me**; Mark McKinney – Dog Park; Callum Keith Rennie – Last Night; Jim Carrey – Man on the Moon; Dave Foley – The Wrong Guy	**Sarah Polley – Go**; Julie Bot, Mary Crosbie, Jeanie Calleja, Gabriela Hahn, and Adrienne Weiss – Bloor Witch Project; Tracy Wright – Last Night; Brigitte Gall – Moving Day; Jennifer Irwin – Superstar
Best Direction	Best Original Screenplay
**Don McKellar – Last Night**; Liam Kiernan – A Little Off the Top; Bruce McCulloch – Dog Park; Chris Deacon – Moving Day; David Steinberg – The Wrong Guy	**Mike Myers – Austin Powers: International Man of Mystery**
Best Writing	Best Writing – Adapted
**Mike Myers – Austin Powers: The Spy Who Shagged Me**; Liam Kiernan – A Little Off the Top; Julie Bot, Mary Crosbie, Jeanie Calleja, Gabriela Hahn, and Adrienne Weiss – Bloor Witch Project; Bruce McCulloch – Dog Park; Don McKellar – Last Night; Chris Deacon – Moving Day	**Tim Burns – Jacob Two Two Meets the Hooded Fang**; David Huband – The Dane

=== Special awards ===
Hall of Fame	PAL Award
Barbara Hamilton; Don Ferguson; Don Harron; John Candy; Wayne & Shuster	**The Happy Gang**

== Multiple wins ==
The following people, shows, films, etc. received multiple awards in the inaugural ceremony:

Awards	Person or work
4	This Hour Has 22 Minutes
3	The Drowsy Chaperone
3	Mike Myers
2	Austin Powers: The Spy Who Shagged Me
2	Don McKellar
2	Made in Canada

== Multiple nominations ==
The following people, shows, films, etc. received multiple nominations.

Nominations	Person or work
6	The Drowsy Chaperone
6	Made in Canada
4	Don McKellar
4	Double Exposure
4	Last Night
4	This Hour Has 22 Minutes
3	Bob Martin
3	Dog Park
3	History Bites
3	Last Night
3	Mike Myers
3	Moving Day
3	Sean Cullen
2	Austin Powers: The Spy Who Shagged Me
2	Bloor Witch Project
2	Bruce McCulloch
2	Chris Deacon
2	Chris Earle
2	Comedy Now!
2	Comics!
2	Jessica Holmes
2	Karen Hines
2	Liam Kiernan
2	A Little Off the Top
2	Nick Orchard
2	Shoshana Sperling
2	The Wrong Guy

== Broadcast ==
The awards ceremony was held in Toronto's Masonic Temple, which CTV Television Network had equipped as a television studio in the late 1990s. The ceremony was recorded for television, produced by Higher Ground Productions and directed by Bob Sorger. A one-hour version of the ceremony was broadcast on CTV at midnight on the night of Friday 7 April 2000, with the full program airing on The Comedy Network on 9 April at 9 pm. The special was well received by the members of the industry it represents, who awarded Sorger the Beaver for best direction of a TV special or episode in 2001.
