= Albert Howell (comedian) =

Canadian comedian, actor and writer

Albert Howell is a Canadian comedian, actor and writer, most noted as a Gemini Award nominee and Canadian Screen Award winner for his work on the writing team for the sketch comedy series This Hour Has 22 Minutes.

Originally from Calgary, Alberta, where he did improv comedy with Loose Moose Theatre while studying political science at the University of Calgary, he later moved to Toronto to join The Second City, appearing in several shows with the company in both Toronto and Chicago between 1993 and 1996.

== Sketch comedy ==
After leaving Second City, Howell and colleague Andrew Currie formed the comedy duo The Devil's Advocates; styling themselves as devil-horned spokesmen for Satan, they began regularly appearing on Citytv's Speakers Corner to present sarcastic commentary on videos recorded by other contributors. Their segments became one of the most popular features of the program, particularly after a senior citizen named Harry began recording his own videos criticizing their videos, turning into a recurring feud. They attracted such a following that at least one special episode of the series was devoted entirely to a "best of" compilation of Devil's Advocate appearances.

In 1998, Howell and Currie were given their own show, Improv Heaven and Hell, on The Comedy Network, which saw the duo as the hosts of an improv comedy competition similar to Whose Line Is It Anyway?. The series ran for three seasons, ending in 2001. Following the show's conclusion, Howell and Currie appeared in the improvisational stage show Sin City: The Live Improvised Soap Opera at the Poor Alex Theatre, alongside Pat Kelly, Peter Oldring, Herbie Barnes, Kirsten Van Ritzen, Joanne O'Sullivan, Mark McIntyre and Raoul Bhaneja.

In 2002, Howell appeared in Population 282 at the Tim Sims Playhouse, alongside Janet van de Graaf, Lisa Merchant, Melody Johnson, Doug Morency, Jack Mosshammer, Leslie Kaz, Adrian Truss and Colin Mochrie.

In 2003, he joined the cast of the sketch comedy series Comedy Inc.. In the same year, he mounted a joke campaign for Mayor of Toronto in the 2003 Toronto municipal election, running primarily on a platform of changing the city's garbage collection practices.

== Writing ==
Following the end of Comedy Inc., Howell joined the writing staff of This Hour Has 22 Minutes, remaining with the show for several years. He subsequently also wrote for the television series That's So Weird! and First World Problems, and was a story editor on the sitcom Satisfaction.

In 2013 he joined the writing staff of Late Night with Jimmy Fallon, although he noted the irony that even though he had previously lived in Toronto and wrote several Rob Ford sketches for 22 Minutes, he was largely sidelined from writing jokes about the crack scandal which broke a few weeks after he joined the show.

== Acting ==
He has also had supporting or guest roles in the films Harold & Kumar Go to White Castle, Childstar, Plain Brown Rapper, Take This Waltz and First Round Down, and the television series The War Next Door, The Endless Grind, Little Mosque on the Prairie, My Babysitter's a Vampire, The Next Step and PEN15.

== Awards ==
Award	Year	Category	Work	Result	Ref(s)
Canadian Comedy Awards	1999	Best Male Improviser	Albert Howell	Nominated	
Canadian Comedy Awards	1999	Best Performance by a Male in Television	Improv Heaven and Hell with Andrew Currie	Nominated	
Canadian Comedy Awards	2004	Best Male Improviser	Albert Howell	Nominated	
Canadian Comedy Awards	2006	Best Writing in a Television Series	Comedy Inc. with Roman Danylo, Aurora Browne, Jennifer Goodhue, Terry McGurrin, Jennifer Robertson, Ian Sirota, Winston Spear, Gavin Stephens	Nominated	
Canadian Comedy Awards	2007	Best Writing in a Television Special or Episode	This Hour Has 22 Minutes with Kevin White, Mark Critch, Gary Pearson, Gavin Crawford, Jennifer Whalen, Dave Nystrom, Carolyn Taylor	Won	
Canadian Comedy Awards	2008	Best Writing in a Television Special or Episode	This Hour Has 22 Minutes with Mark Critch, Gavin Crawford, Gary Pearson, Kyle Tingley, Jennifer Whalen, Tim McAuliffe, Nathan Fielder, Geri Hall, Andrew Bush, Dean Jenkinson	Won	
Canadian Comedy Awards	2009	Best Writing in a Television Program or Series	This Hour Has 22 Minutes with Mark Critch, Gavin Crawford, Kyle Tingley, Jennifer Whalen, Tim McAuliffe, Dean Jenkinson, Geri Hall, Nathan Fielder, Joanne O'Sullivan, Peter White	Nominated	
Canadian Comedy Awards	2011	Best Writing in a Television Program or Series	This Hour Has 22 Minutes with Tim McAuliffe, Mark Critch, Cathy Jones, Gavin Crawford, Kyle Tingley, Dean Jenkinson, Mike Allison, David Kerr, Bob Kerr	Nominated	
Gemini Awards	2007	Ensemble Performance in a Comedy Program or Series	Comedy Inc. with Roman Danylo, Aurora Browne, Jennifer Goodhue, Terry McGurrin, Jennifer Robertson, Ian Sirota, Winston Spear, Gavin Stephens	Nominated	
Gemini Awards	2008	Best Writing in a Comedy or Variety Program or Series	This Hour Has 22 Minutes with Andrew Bush, Gavin Crawford, Mark Critch, Nathan Fielder, Geri Hall, Dean Jenkinson, Tim McAuliffe, Gary Pearson, Kyle Tingley, Jennifer Whalen	Nominated	
WGC Screenwriting Awards	2008	Writing, Television Variety	This Hour Has 22 Minutes with Kevin White, Mark Critch, Irwin Barker, Gavin Crawford, Gary Pearson, Jennifer Whalen, Carolyn Taylor, Dave Nystrom, Geri Hall, Todd Allen, Tim McAuliffe	Won	
WGC Screenwriting Awards	2009	Writing, Television Variety	This Hour Has 22 Minutes with Mark Critch, Gavin Crawford, Kyle Tingley, Jennifer Whalen, Tim McAuliffe, Dean Jenkinson, Geri Hall, Nathan Fielder	Won	
WGC Screenwriting Awards	2010	Writing, Television Variety	This Hour Has 22 Minutes with Ed Macdonald, Mark Critch, Gavin Crawford, Kyle Tingley, Dean Jenkinson, Joanne O’Sullivan, Tara Doyle, Erik van Wyck, Mike Allison, Joey Case	Won	
Canadian Screen Awards	March 9, 2014	Best Writing, Variety or Sketch Comedy	This Hour Has 22 Minutes with Bob Kerr, Cathy Jones, Dean Jenkinson, Gary Pearson, Greg Thomey, Mark Critch, Mary Walsh, Michael Balazo, Mike Allison, Nigel Lawrence, Rupinder Gill, Scott Vrooman, Shaun Majumder, Susan Kent	Won	
