= Canadian clowning =

Mask-based style of performance

The Canadian Clowning technique is a mask-based style of performance created by Richard Pochinko. Also known as the "Pochinko Method" or "Clown Through Mask", seven masks are used, each representing one of the six physical directions (North, South, East, West, Above-above and Below-below). The final, seventh, mask is the clown nose. Variations include a three-mask technique (based on the three polarities) and a six-in-one mask technique.

Pochinko taught clowning as a sort of "reverse therapy", in which instead of ridding oneself of anxieties, the clown performer leans into their own insecurities and foibles in order to package them as comedy. "Get applauded for your idiosyncrasies" was one of his key mottos as a trainer. According to Michael "Mump" Kennard, one of the most prominent practitioners and trainers of Canadian clowning since Pochinko's death in 1989, "Clowns should be fun no matter what the topic is, but the comedy has to come from the tragedy. You just can't go out and be funny all the time. It has no meaning. It still has to be real, because if it's not real, the audience has nothing to relate to."

Most clowning techniques (Eastern, European, etc.) focus on basic structure and formalism as the basis from which to start story creation. The Pochinko Clown begins by focusing on one's personal naturally occurring emotions and impulses, and then structuring that creative licence into a story and performance. One of the most significant distinctions between Pochinko's "Canadian clown" technique and other clowning traditions is Pochinko's claim to have been taught a First Nations clowning tradition.

Noted students of the Pochinko technique have included Karen Hines, Cheryl Cashman, Mump and Smoot, Nion, Tantoo Cardinal, David MacMurray-Smith, Sue Morrison and Sara Tilley.
