= History Bites =

- History Bites logo
- Created by: Rick Green
- Written by: Duncan McKenzie; Danny DiTata; Jeremy Winkels; Eric Lunsky; Amy McKenzie; David Ravvin (season 1)
- Presented by: Rick Green
- Starring: Rick Green; Ron Pardo; Janet van de Graaf; Teresa Pavlinek; Peter Oldring; Sarah Lafleur; Danny DiTata; Jeremy Winkels; Eric Lunsky; Amy McKenzie; Duncan McKenzie; Sam Kalilieh
- Country of origin: Canada
- Original language: English
- No. of seasons: 5
- No. of episodes: 101 (including pilot) + 6 Specials (list of episodes)

Production
- Executive producer: David C. Smith
- Production company: S&S Productions

Original release
- Network: History Television
- Release: October 1, 1998 – July 31, 2004

History Bites is a television series on History Television that ran from 1998 to 2004. It was a prime-time program. Created by Rick Green, History Bites explored what would be on television if the medium had been around for the last 5,000 years of human history.

Typically, a significant historical event was chosen and mock news, sports and entertainment programming was created around it. Each episode included several segments of Green offering historical background of the episode's chosen era and otherwise showed frequent shifts from one comedy sketch to another (as well as returning to certain sketches repeatedly) representing a channel-surfing viewer who never watched any one sketch for more than a few minutes at a time. Furthermore, the theme of the series is about debunking misplaced nostalgia about historical periods by illustrating their often absurd injustices and brutal realities to modern sensibilities.

== Synopsis ==
Contemporary movies, television shows and personalities (Martha Stewart, Don Cherry, Tom Brokaw, Dennis Miller, Larry King and Andy Rooney, among others) were comically adapted to the chosen era. For example, the legendary revenge story of the "47 Ronin" of early 18th-century Japan was told in the style of a made-for-TV movie modelled on the real-life film The Godfather. Television sitcoms such as Seinfeld and All in the Family were also frequently parodied, with the characters commenting on time-appropriate events, be it Joan of Arc or the benefits of joining the elite Persian Immortals. Game and reality shows were parodied as well, including a depiction of the Donner Party as participants in an 1846 version of Survivor, and almost every episode featured segments that parodied Jeopardy!, Who Wants to Be a Millionaire and/or The Weakest Link, in which contestants answered trivia questions about the common beliefs of the featured era. Anachronisms were frequent and deliberate, adding to the show's distinctive humour. For example, in one episode set in AD 100 and focusing on gladiatorial combat, the "Zamboni family" was responsible for tidying the Colosseum between bouts, in reference to modern Zamboni machines that repair rink surfaces during intermissions at ice hockey games.

By far, the earliest setting for an episode has been 6000 BC, in which viewers were advised on pre-monotheism ritual as well as the new technologies of agriculture, the bow and arrow and house-building. It also included a parody of a hospital show in which the treatment for every ailment was a trepanation. The most recent setting was 1881, in an episode largely about "The Shootout At Fly's Photographic Studio", a historically more accurate description of the event commonly known as the gunfight at the O.K. Corral.

The show's production values improved over the five seasons, increasing and refining the use of sets, costumes and props. Never lost was Green's message (stated explicitly in the first episode and alluded to in the closing of each episode) that fond nostalgia is misplaced and that the lives of our ancestors were rife with oppression, ignorance (including casually held antisemitic and/or racist beliefs), disease and suffering. Ultimately, the title History Bites has a double meaning, referring to the "soundbites"-like nature of the short clips from each sketch, as well as the often brutal and unpleasant nature of the history being satirized.

== Parodies ==
Films, television programs and personalities parodied on History Bites include:

=== Recurring ===
- 20/20, parodying Barbara Walters
- 60 Minutes
- All in the Family
- America's Most Wanted, usually changed to "_____'s Most
  Wanted" when in a different country
- Andy Rooney
- Crossfire
- Dating Game
- Dennis Miller
- Ebert & Roeper
- Ed Sullivan and The Ed Sullivan Show
- Everybody Loves Raymond
- Hockey Night in Canada, including a direct parody of Don Cherry
- Hollywood Squares
- Home Shopping Network
- The Howard Stern Radio Show
- Infomercials for products/services common of the time
- It's a Wonderful Life, only the scene where George asks Clarence what happened to everybody
- Jeopardy!
- Judge Judy
- Larry King
- Rowan & Martin's Laugh-In
- Married... with Children
- Martha Stewart
- NBC Nightly News
- Richard Simmons
- Russell Oliver (a used jewellery salesman in Toronto with famously funny commercials)
- Seinfeld
- South Park
- Speaker's Corner
- Star Trek
- The Andy Griffith Show
- The Bachelor
- The Crocodile Hunter
- Late Show with David Letterman, usually, but not always, in the form of a Top 10 list
- The Price Is Right
- The Simpsons
- The Tonight Show
- The Weakest Link
- The X-Files
- TV Guide
- Washington Week in Review, usually just called Week in Review
- Who Wants to Be a Millionaire?

=== Individual ===
- American Justice, as Medieval Justice to tell the story of the Knights Templar
- Annie Hall, adapted to be set during The French Revolution
- A Beautiful Mind, adapted to tell the story of Sir Isaac Newton
- The Bachelor, adapted to tell the colonization of Utah and the Mormons' then-practice of polygamy.
- The Day the Earth Stood Still, adapted to tell the story of Christopher Columbus
- The Godfather, adapted to tell the story of the 47 Ronin
- The Jerry Springer Show, adapted to tell the story of Mary, Queen of Scots
- Law & Order, adapted to depict an investigation and prosecution of the murder of Thomas Becket
- The Olympic Games
- On the Road Again, adapted as On the Road to Domesday! about the compilation of the Domesday Book
- The Osbournes, adapted to tell the story of Pope Alexander VI
- Pokémon/Sailor Moon, adapted to tell the story of The Borgias as well as Leonardo da Vinci's inventions.
- Scooby-Doo, adapted to tell the story of Mountain Meadows Massacre
- Thelma and Louise, adapted to tell the story of Boudica

== Animation ==
The fifth season of History Bites and most of the specials feature cartoon segments in a wide variety of styles animated by Bryce Hallett of Frog Feet Productions. These include parodies of Batman: the Animated Series (aka Captain Puritan), Pokémon/anime cartoons, Scooby-Doo and 1950s educational films as well as original material and styles in the specials. The cartoons are short but ambitious considering the modest budget of the show.

== Specials ==
- History Bites "The End Of The World" was a one-hour special on how people reacted to the first new millennium on December 31, 1999.

After the end of the 5th season, History Bites continued with a series of one-hour specials. These episodes did not feature the channel-surfing theme that earlier episodes did.

- History Bites "Mother Britain", airing on Canada Day, July 1, 2005, covering the history of the relationship between Canada and Britain from the first explorers to the patriation of the Constitution. It featured actors portraying all 21 Canadian Prime Ministers up to that point.
- History Bites "Uncle Sam", about the history of U.S./Canada relations.
- History Bites "The Separatists", a special that aired June 24, 2007 on the history of separatists movements in Canada from the Upper and Lower Canada Rebellions to the Clarity Act.
- History Bites "Celine Dion", aired on Feb. 10, 2008, examined the history of Canadians moving to the United States for fame and money.
- History Bites "Sex & Power", aired in 2008, about the intertwining of sex and politics throughout history.

== Actors ==
Regulars on the show (along with the characters they played/parodied) include:

- Ron Pardo: David Letterman, Ed Sullivan, Howard Stern, Dennis Miller, Don Cherry, Tom Brokaw, Ted Koppel, Ivan the Terrible, Larry King, Regis Philbin, Julius Caesar, Justinian I, William Shakespeare, Henry Hudson, Bill Maher, Dating Game contestant, Jerry Seinfeld, Jerry Springer, interviewed merchant, Woody Allen, Archie Bunker, Paul 'Pegleg' Begala, Neil Diamond, Gene Siskel, Bill Clinton, Sir Isaac Newton.
- Rick Green: Ron MacLean, Hugh Downs, Timmy the Jeopardy! contestant, Dating Game contestant, interviewed monk.
- Bob Bainborough: period newscaster, game show host, infomercial lawyer, Andy Rooney, Tamerlane, Galileo Galilei, Nostradamus, John Calvin, Oliver Cromwell, Pythagoras, Neolithic doctor, Shakespearean actor, Samurai, Vlad the Impaler, Alexander the Great's general.
- Janet van de Graaf: Martha Stewart, Bev Downer, Barbara Walters, Greta Van Susteren, Anne Robinson, Empress Theodora, period on-location newscaster, interviewed noblewoman.
- Teresa Pavlinek: period newscaster, Cleopatra, Neolithic nurse, interviewed Valley girl peasant, interviewed Puritan woman, Hatshepsut.
- Peter Oldring: Children's show host, Cheng Ho, Alexander the Great, Bill Maher, George Costanza (Seinfeld), Dating Game contestant, dating infomercial host, interviewed rebellious teenager.
- Sarah Lafleur: video show host, Elaine Benes (Seinfeld), dating game contestant, Joan of Arc.
- Sam Kalilieh: Throk (Neolithic farmer), Sostratos of Sycion (Olympic Pankration champion), Thutmoses III, Sargon of Akkad, Tom Green, Pistachio the gladiator, interviewed common man.

As well, members of the show's writing staff were frequently used as extras or in bit roles, and as the series progressed, the writers (especially Danny DiTata) began to be featured in larger roles:

- Danny DiTata (writer): Steve Irwin, Wyatt Earp, Jesus, Richard Simmons, George Costanza (Seinfeld), leper.
- Jeremy Winkels (writer): Paul Shaffer, common man.
- Eric Lunsky (writer): Charles the Simple, Native American, Egyptian architect, interviewed merchant, interviewed peasant.
- Amy McKenzie (writer): Judge Judy, Shakespearean actor (not actress), interviewed peasant.
- Duncan McKenzie (writer): Abraham Lincoln, William Farel, Leonard the Jeopardy! contestant.

Notable guest stars include:

- Patrick McKenna
- Wayne Robson
- Jessica Holmes
- Bob Martin
- Mag Ruffman

== See also ==
- The Complete and Utter History of Britain
- Horrible Histories
