= Greg Morrison =

Canadian composer and writer

Greg Morrison is a Canadian composer and writer best known for his work on the Tony Award-winning musical The Drowsy Chaperone, written with songwriting partner, Lisa Lambert. The Drowsy Chaperone was their first collaboration. In 1999 Lambert asked Morrison to work on a musical to perform at the wedding stag party of their friends, Bob Martin and Janet Van De Graaff. Also a part of this original writing team was filmmaker, Don McKellar. That was the first incarnation of The Drowsy Chaperone. This was followed by an expanded production of the show at the Toronto Fringe festival, where Martin joined as a co-writer and performer.

Greg is a graduate of the Humber College Jazz program in Toronto. He began his theatre career as musical director for the touring company of The Second City in Toronto. As well as working for The Second City, Greg composed and performed scores and musical direction for a variety of Toronto artists, most notably, playwright Karen Hines, powerhouse horror clown duo, Mump and Smoot and Canadian theatre icon Linda Griffiths. He continues to write for theatre as well as writing songs for television and film.

== Theater credits ==
=== Composer and lyricist ===
- The Drowsy Chaperone. Co-composer with Lisa Lambert.
- Hello ... Hello (Tarragon Theatre)
- Pochsy Unplugged (Toronto Fringe premiere, Canadian/U.S. tours)
- Mump and Smoot in Something Else (Canadian Stage, Yale Repertory Theatre)
- Mump and Smoot in Flux (Canadian Stage)
- An Awkward Evening With Martin and Johnson (Tim Sims Playhouse)
- The Age of Dorian (Artword Theatre)
- Pochsy's Lips
- Oh, Baby
- Citizen Pochsy

=== Musical director ===
- Mump and Smoot
- The Second City National Touring Company and the Alumni Cafe (Tim Sims Playhouse)
- The Chumps and The Muckrakers (CBC Radio).

=== Television songwriting ===
- Slings & Arrows (Rhombus Media)
- Getting Along Famously (CBC)
- Sensitive Skin (Rhombus Media)

== Awards and nominations ==
- Tony Award for Best Original Score The Drowsy Chaperone (2006) – Winner
- Drama Desk Award for Outstanding Lyrics The Drowsy Chaperone (2006) – Winner
- Drama Desk Award for Outstanding Music The Drowsy Chaperone (2006) – Winner
- Tony Award for Best Musical The Drowsy Chaperone (2006) – Nominee
- Canadian Comedy Award
- Sterling Award for Original Composition
- Cream of Comedy Award '98
