= Dave Nystrom =

Canadian comedian and writer (born 1971)

Dave Nystrom (born May 27, 1971) is a Canadian comedian and writer based in Calgary, Alberta.

Originally from Thunder Bay, Ontario, he moved to Vancouver, British Columbia, in 1994 to attend the Vancouver Film School, becoming a regular performer at Vancouver-area comedy clubs.

In 2005 he headlined his own Comedy Now! special on The Comedy Network, and he later joined the writing team for This Hour Has 22 Minutes.

Following a number of years living in the United States, he moved back to Canada in the late 2010s, settling in Calgary because it was his wife's hometown. He has since returned to performing in Canadian comedy clubs, and has also had occasional supporting acting roles in film and television.

== Awards ==
Award	Date of ceremony	Category	Nominee	Result	Ref.
Canadian Comedy Awards	2007	Best Writing in a Television Special or Episode	This Hour Has 22 Minutes: "Season 14, Episode 3" with Kevin White, Mark Critch, Gary Pearson, Gavin Crawford, Jennifer Whalen, Carolyn Taylor, Albert Howell	Won	
WGC Screenwriting Awards	2008	Best Writing in Television Variety	This Hour Has 22 Minutes: "Season 14, Episode 17" with Kevin White, Mark Critch, Irwin Barker, Gavin Crawford, Gary Pearson, Jennifer Whalen, Carolyn Taylor, Albert Howell, Geri Hall, Todd Allen, Tim McAuliffe	Won	
