= Improv Heaven and Hell =

Canadian comedy television series

- Presented by: Albert Howell; Andrew Currie
- Country of origin: Canada
- Original language: English
- No. of series: 2

Original release
- Network: The Comedy Network
- Release: October 10, 1998 – 2001

Improv Heaven and Hell is a Canadian comedy television series, which aired on The Comedy Network from 1998 to 2001. Hosted by Albert Howell and Andrew Currie, a comedy duo billed as The Devil's Advocates, the series featured a rotating cast of Canadian comedians and actors performing in an improvisational comedy competition similar to Whose Line Is It Anyway?

Howell and Currie, both veterans of The Second City's Toronto company, first became prominent as regular contributors of video comedy segments to Citytv's Speakers' Corner.

The first season of the series was taped at the Masonic Temple, and the second was taped at the Bathurst Street Theatre.

Performers who appeared on the series as competitors included Peter Oldring, Lindsay Leese, Bob Martin, Frank McAnulty, Lisa Merchant, Colin Mochrie, Jack Mosshammer, Paul O'Sullivan, Jenny Parsons, Teresa Pavlinek and Janet van de Graaf.
