= Too Much Sex =

2000 film by Andrew Ainsworth

- Directed by: Andrew Ainsworth
- Written by: Andrew Ainsworth
- Produced by: Jeffrey Berman; Tina Grewal
- Starring: Michael McMurtry; Janet Kidder; Diane Flacks
- Cinematography: Christopher Ball
- Edited by: Peter Watson
- Release date: 2000
- Running time: 84 minutes
- Country: Canada
- Language: English

Too Much Sex is a 2000 Canadian sex comedy film directed by Andrew Ainsworth, produced by the Canadian Film Centre and starring Michael McMurtry, Janet Kidder (niece of Margot Kidder) and Diane Flacks. Sky Gilbert and Christie MacFadyen (who starred in The Top of His Head) also have minor appearances.

== Plot ==
Allgood Butts is a young promiscuous male hairdresser whose goal in life is to sleep with as many women as possible (already in the first scenes we are told he has slept with 389 women). His guardian angel (played by Diane Flacks) does not approve of his philandering and confronts him while he has sex with his 390th woman, telling him that if he sleeps with another woman, he'll die. Allgood's struggle with his temptation becomes even more difficult when two attractive women enter his life.
