= The Sting (musical) =

American musical thriller

- Music: Mark Hollmann and Greg Kotis, with Harry Connick Jr.
- Lyrics: Mark Hollmann and Greg Kotis, with Harry Connick Jr.
- Book: Bob Martin
- Basis: 1973 film The Sting
- Premiere: March 29, 2018: Paper Mill Playhouse
- Productions: 2018 Paper Mill Playhouse

The Sting is an American musical thriller with a book by Bob Martin and music and lyrics by Mark Hollmann, Greg Kotis, and Harry Connick Jr., based on the 1973 film The Sting.

== Productions ==
The Paper Mill Playhouse presented the musical in a limited engagement from March 29 until April 29, 2018. The score contained music by Scott Joplin including "The Entertainer". John Rando directed, with choreography by Warren Carlyle and music direction by Fred Lassen.

The Paper Mill Playhouse production was billed as a "pre-broadway tryout", but as of September 2021, the show is yet to open on Broadway.

== Synopsis ==
Chicago. 1936. Get ready to enter a smoke-filled world of cons and capers, where nothing is what it seems and no one is who they appear to be. Based on the 1973 Academy Award-winning film, The Sting tells the tale of a pair of con men, small town grifter Johnny Hooker and big-time hustler Henry Gondorff (Harry Connick, Jr.), who plot to bring down the city's most corrupt racketeer. The Sting takes you back to an era where jazz reigns, the stakes are high, and the dice are always loaded.

== Musical numbers ==
Act I

- "You Can't Trust Nobody" – Luther, Hooker, The Erie Kid, and Ensemble
- "The Thrill of the Con" – Hooker, Luther, The Erie Kid, and Ensemble
- "Lonnegan's Revenge" – Lonnegan
- "Ragtime Rip" – Gondorff and Hooker
- "We're Back" – Gondorff, Billie, Kid Twist, Singleton, and Ensemble
- "Some Say" – Hooker and Loretta
- "The Chase" – Orchestra
- "The Card Game" – Gondorff, Lonnegan, and Poker Players
- "I Roll Bones with the Devil" – Hooker
- "The First Race" – Singleton, The Erie Kid, Hooker, Lonnegan, and Ensemble

Act II

- "This Ain't No Song and Dance" – Gondorff and Ensemble
- "Don't Treat Your Friends Like Marks" – Gondorff and Hooker
- "Nighttime is Better" – Loretta
- "Show Me the Man" – Billie, The Erie Kid, and Mr. Harmon
- "Confidence" – Hooker and Luther
- "Tough Times" – Gondorff
- "Sometimes" – Billie
- "This Ain't No Song and Dance" (Reprise) – Gondorff
- "Ain't Nothing" – Gondorff
- "The Second Race" – Company
- "The Thrill of the Con" (Reprise) – Hooker and Gondorff

The score of The Sting features "The Entertainer", "The Easy Winners", "Solace", "The Strenuous Life", "The Chrysanthemum", "The Cascades", "A Breeze from Alabama", "Rose Leaf Rag", and "The Ragtime Dance" composed by Scott Joplin, and "Heliotrope Bouquet" by Scott Joplin and Louis Chauvin.

== Cast ==
| Character | Paper Mill (2018) |
|---|---|
| The Erie Kid | Peter Benson |
| Henry Gondorff | Harry Connick Jr. |
| Loretta | Janet Dacal |
| J.J. Singleton | Christopher Gurr |
| Johnny Hooker | J. Harrison Ghee |
| Doyle Lonnegan | Tom Hewitt |
| Kid Twist | Richard Kline |
| Luther | Kevyn Morrow |
| Billie | Kate Shindle |
| Lt. Snyder | Robert Wuhl |

== Reception ==
The musical garnered mediocre reviews upon opening at the Paper Mill Playhouse. Ghee received almost unanimously positive reviews, with one critic saying Ghee "has charisma to spare and estimable singing and dancing chops." Connick, Jr. received mixed to positive reviews, with multiple critics claiming him to be charming, if not quite as charismatic as his film counterpart. Much of the supporting cast, specifically Shindle and Hewitt, were praised for their performances. Warren Carlyle's choreography was also very warmly received.

Conversely, many critics called the direction and production bland and uninspired and the music forgettable. Bob Martin's book was also panned as not up to his usual comedic standards.
