= List of History Bites episodes =

The following is an episode list of the Rick Green show, History Bites, which ran from 1998 to 2004. The show was created by Rick Green.

== Episodes ==
=== Season 1 ===
Title	Original airdate	#
The Gods Must Be Angry	Unknown	Pilot
A look at the Mount Vesuvius eruption (79 AD).
The Black Death	October 1, 1998	101
A look at the Black Death in Europe (1348 AD).
Caligula Is Croaked	October 8, 1998	102
A look at the Roman Emperor Caligula (41 AD).
Dead Philosopher Walking	October 15, 1998	103
A look at the Greek philosopher Socrates (399 BC).
Great Fire of London	October 22, 1998	104
A look at the Great Fire of London (1666 AD).
Charlemagne	October 29, 1998	105
A look at the great Emperor Charlemagne (800 AD).
The Declaration of Independence	November 5, 1998	106
A look at the American Declaration of Independence (1776 AD).
Magna Carta	November 12, 1998	107
A look at the signing of the Magna Carta (1215 AD).
Pure Vandalism	November 19, 1998	108
A look at the Vandals and the sacking of Rome (455 AD).
The French Revolution	November 26, 1998	109
A look at the French Revolution, in the time just preceding the execution of Robespierre (1794 AD).
The Spanish Inquisition	December 3, 1998	110
A look at the Spanish Inquisition (1492 AD).
Bjarney & Friends	December 10, 1998	111
A look at the Viking Bjarni Herjólfsson, who discovered North America (998 AD).
The Battle of Waterloo	December 17, 1998	112
A look at the Battle of Waterloo (1815 AD).
The Bloody Aztecs	December 24, 1998	113
A look at the fight between the Aztecs and Cortez (1521 AD).

=== Season 2 ===
Title	Original airdate	#
Gutenberg's Laptop	1999	201
A look at Johannes Gutenberg, the inventor of the printing press (1455 AD).
Cartier Does Canada	1999	202
A look at the explorer Jacques Cartier (1536 AD).
Ransomed by Vikings	1999	203
A look at the abduction of the Archbishop of Canterbury by the 'Scandinavian Mafia' (1011 AD).
Operation Desert Crusade	1999	204
A look at the Christian Crusade to reclaim Jerusalem (1099 AD).
The Celibate Celebrity of 1429	1999	205
A look at Joan of Arc (1429 AD).
The Big Sex Scandal	1999	206
A look at King David and his wife Bathsheba (970 BC).
The Sistine Ceiling	1999	207
A look at Michelangelo's painting of the Sistine Chapel (1512 AD).
Saying No to Terrorism	1999	208
A look at Moses (1200 BC).
Galileo Cops a Plea	1998	209
A look at Galileo's heresy trial (1616 AD).
Worse Than Genghis Khan	1999	210
A look at Tamerlane, last and worst of the horseback barbarians (1402 AD).
The Commander in Chief Is a Eunuch	1999	211
A look at Cheng Ho, the eunuch leader of a Chinese treasure fleet (1403 AD).
A Woman for All Seasons	1999	212
A look at Hildegard von Bingen (1170 AD).
Bulbs, Boom & Bust!	1999	213
A look at the Dutch Tulip Bubble (1630s AD).
Cleo Can Kiss My Asp	1999	214
A look at Cleopatra, Antony, and Octavian (31 BC).
My Canada Includes Quebec	1999	215
A look at the Battle of the Plains of Abraham (1759 AD).
The Not-So-Great Wall of China	1999	216
A look at the Great Wall of China (240 BC).
Invasion U.S.A.!	1999	217
A look at the invasion of Washington D.C. and the burning of the White House during the War of 1812 (1814 AD).
Spartans, Get Ready to Rumble!	1999	218
A look at the Battle of Thermopylae (490 BC), via a parody of WWE wrestling.
Welcome to Oz	1999	219
A look at the transportation of prisoners to the colonies in Australia (1787 AD).
The Tiananmen Square of 532 A.D.	1999	220
A look at Emperor Justinian (532 AD).
The Pregnant Pirates	1999	221
A look at the capture and trial of Anne Bonney and Mary Read (1720 AD).
The King Has Left The Building	1999	222
A look at Empress Catherine the Great and Pugachev's revolt (1774 AD).
Shakespeare in Love – Drake in Battle	1999	223
A look at the Spanish Armada (1582 AD).
Everything You Need to Know About God	1999	224
A look at the Council of Nicaea (325 AD).

=== Season 3 ===
Title	Original airdate	#
Vikings à la Mode	2000	301
A look at the Viking Rollo the Gangor's invasion of northern France (911 AD).
The Captain Who Couldn't Sail Straight	2000	302
A look at the British explorer Henry Hudson's voyage to discover a passage to India (1611 AD), satire of the title to the book The Gang That Couldn't Shoot Straight.
Battle of the Anti-Popes	2000	303
A look at the struggle between the Pope Gregory XII and Pope Benedict XII (1409 AD).
Nero Business Like Show Business	2000	304
A look at the Roman Emperor Nero (65 AD).
Truth Or Prayer, The Crusade Tour	2000	305
A look at Eleanor of Aquitaine's Crusade (1147 AD) done as a parody of Madonna's Truth or Dare.
Goodbye Tudor Rose	2000	306
A look at Catherine Howard's life and execution (1542 AD), done as a parody of the media coverage of Princess Diana's death, and featuring a parody of the commemorative version of Elton John's song "Candle in the Wind").
The Duelling Transvestite	2000	307
A look at the Chevalier d'Eon (1776 AD).
Rebel With A Cause	2000	308
A look at the Roman perspective of Jesus Christ's crucifixion (33 AD).
Dracula's Evil Twin	2000	309
A look at Prince Vlad of Wallachia (15th century AD).
Neolithic Park	2000	310
A look at discovery of agriculture (6000 BC).
My Pharaoh Lady	2000	311
A look at Pharaoh Hatshepsut (1500 BC).
Between Me & My Calvin	2000	312
A look at French theologian John Calvin (1553 AD).
Alexander's Wartime Band	2000	313
A look at Alexander the Great (323 BC).
Monk On A Hot Tin Roof	2000	314
A look at Savonarola, the priest who took over Florence (1490 AD).
Glengarry Glen Baa	2000	315
A look at the Highland Clearances (1814 AD).
Saladin's Last Stand	2000	316
A look at the Muslim leader Saladin (1192 AD).
The Mounties' Comical Ride	2000	317
A look at the North-West Mounted Police's first trek west (1874 AD) done as a parody of Cops.
The Man Who Wouldn't Be King	2000	318
A look at the Puritan leader Oliver Cromwell (1649 AD).
A New Angle On The Gods	2000	319
A look at Pythagoras and his followers (560 BC).
When Irish Eyes Are Starvin'	2000	320
A look at the Great Famine of Ireland (1840s AD).
Gladiators: Too Hot for TV	2000	321
A look at the Roman sport of gladiatorial combat (100 AD).
The First Emperor	2000	322
A look at Sargon the Great, Emperor of Mesopotamia (2500 BC).
There's Gold in Them Thar Beavers	2000	323
A look at Pierre-Esprit Radisson & Médard des Groseilliers (1660s AD).
The Shootout At Fly's Photographic Studio	2000	324
A look at the Shootout at the OK Corral (1881 AD).

=== Season 4 ===
Title	Original airdate	#
A Canterbury Murder Tale	April 8, 2002	401
A look at the murder of Thomas Becket, the Archbishop of Canterbury (1170 AD) done as a parody of Law & Order.
Francis & Me	April 9, 2002	402
A look at William Lyon Mackenzie and the Upper Canada Rebellion (1837 AD) done in the style of a Michael Moore documentary.
Rock & Roll Has Got to Go!	April 10, 2002	403
A look at music and youth in ancient Athens(340 BC), done as a parody of a Beatles retrospective.
Leaving Norman	April 11, 2002	404
A look at the compilation of the Domesday Book (1086 AD) done as a parody of the Wayne Rostad CBC show On the Road Again.
The Day The Island Stood Still	April 12, 2002	405
A look at the European discovery of North America from the point of view of the Native Americans (1492 AD). Done as a parody of The Day the Earth Stood Still.
Love & Death	April 13, 2002	406
A look at Goethe and the fervour that accompanied his book, The Sorrows of Young Werther (1780 AD). Parodies Star Trek fandom.
Samurai Goodfellas	April 16, 2002	407
A look at the 47 Ronin (1703 AD) done in the style of The Godfather and with a parody of the Paramount Pictures logo (as 'Fujimount'.)
Who Killed J.F.C.?	April 17, 2002	408
A look at the assassination of Julius Caesar (24 BC) that suggests the assassination was the result of a lone knife man, rather than the official story that was a conspiracy. Done as a reversal of the conspiracy theories surrounding the assassination of John F. Kennedy.
The Uncivil War	April 18, 2002	409
A look at the story behind Lincoln's Emancipation Proclamation (1864 AD), done as a parody of The West Wing.
Temptation Monastery	April 19, 2002	410
A look at Peter Abelard (1140 AD), via his appearance on The Howard Stern Show.
Terror for the Sake of Terror	April 22, 2002	411
A look at Ivan the Terrible (1582 AD) appearing on Oprah.
Harpsichord Wizard	April 23, 2002	412
A look at Ludwig van Beethoven (1839 AD). Done as a parody of an award show.
Xena's Evil Sister	April 24, 2002	413
A look at Boadicea and the Celtic revolt against Rome (61 AD) done as a parody of Thelma and Louise.
Kamikaze Save the Day	April 25, 2002	414
A look at the typhoon that saved Japan from the invading armies of Kublai Khan (1281 AD).
Domestic Terrorism	April 26, 2002	415
A look at Guy Fawkes and the Gunpowder Plot (1605 AD).
Where No White Man Has Gone Before	April 29, 2002	416
A look at the Lewis and Clark Expedition (1805 AD).
Goodnight Good Knights	April 30, 2002	417
A look at the Knights Templar (1307 AD).
Stairway to Heaven	May 1, 2002	418
A look at Emperor Nebuchadrezzar of Babylon (590 BC).
Psychic Celebrity	May 2, 2002	419
A look at Nostrodamus's predictions (1555 AD) done as an infomercial.
Bewitched	May 3, 2002	420
A look at the Salem Witch Trials (1692 AD). Done as a parody of Judge Judy.
Five Ring Circus	May 6, 2002	421
A look at the original Olympic Games (350 BC).
Gratuitous Sex & Violence	May 7, 2002	422
A look at the plays of William Shakespeare (1601 AD) via a parody of Entertainment Tonight.
Out Wit, Out Walk, Out Eat	May 8, 2002	423
A look at the Donner Party (1846 AD) as a parody of Survivor.
Ten Lost Days	May 9, 2002	424
A look at the switch from the Julian calendar to the Gregorian calendar (1582 AD).

=== Season 5 ===
Title	Original airdate	#
The Osborgias	April 17, 2004	501
A look at Pope Alexander VI aka Rodrigo Borgia and his scheming family (1500 AD). Done as a parody of The Osbournes.
Talkin' Turkey	April 24, 2004	502
A look at the first Thanksgiving celebration between the Pilgrims and the Wampanoag (1621 AD) via parody of All in the Family.
Never Been Kissed	May 1, 2004	503
A look at Ulrich von Liechtenstein, a knight who toured Europe in a white dress and blonde wig promoting courtly love appears on Live with Regent and Kelli. (1227 AD).
The Politics of Puffy Pants	May 8, 2004	504
A look at the Reign of Terror in France (1794 AD). Done as a parody of a Seinfeld episode. Jerry's girlfriend want him to wear a not-puffy shirt and he can't refuse or she will accuse him of being counter-revolutionary and he will be guillotined.
I Pray the Fifth	May 15, 2004	505
A look at the Cathars (1244 AD) via parody of McCarthyism.
A.D.D. in 1510 AD	May 22, 2004	506
A look at Leonardo da Vinci (1495 AD).
The Truth Is Out There	May 29, 2004	507
A look at the Battle of Little Big Horn (1876 AD) via parody of The X-Files.
Marco & Nick's Excellent Adventure	June 12, 2004	508
A look at Marco Polo and his book Il Milione (1302 AD).
Tax This!	June 19, 2004	509
A look at the American Revolution (1776 AD) done as a parody of Rowan & Martin's Laugh-In.
Queen Takes Queen, Checkmate	June 26, 2004	510
A look at the rivalry between Mary, Queen of Scots, and Elizabeth I (1587 AD) as seen on The Jerry Springer Show.
Got You Dead to Rights	July 3, 2004	511
A look at the incredible story of a Pope Formosus, who was dug up and put on trial in the Cadaver Synod (897 AD). Done as a parody of The Practice.
Girls! Girls! Girls!	July 10, 2004	512
A look at the Mormon's early practices of polygamy (1857 AD) done as an episode of The Bachelor.
To Boldly Go...	July 17, 2004	513
A look at Spanish Conquistador Francisco Pizarro's journey to Peru (1529 AD). Done as an episode of Star Trek.
A Win-Win War	July 24, 2004	514
A look at the War of 1812 (1812–1814 AD) via a parody of Crossfire.
A Newtiful Mind	July 31, 2004	515
A look at Isaac Newton (1690 AD). Done as a parody of an Ebert & Roper review of A Beautiful Mind.

== Timeline ==
This is a list of episodes arranged chronologically.
