= Mump and Smoot =

Canadian clown duo

- Born: Michael Kennard; John Turner; Canada

Comedy career
- Medium: Theatre, comedy
- Genres: Physical comedy, surreal humour, clown
- Website: mumpandsmoot.com

Mump and Smoot are a Canadian clown duo created by Michael Kennard and John Turner, and directed by Karen Hines. Also referred to as 'clowns of horror', they have produced interactive, improvisational plays aimed squarely at adult audiences.

== History ==
Kennard and Turner met in Toronto in 1986 in Second City workshops, where they discovered a mutual talent for improvising with gibberish dialogue. While at Second City, they met Karen Hines, who has directed all their shows. Kennard and Turner also studied under Richard Pochinko in a new field of what he called Canadian clowning. On May 13, 1988, Mump and Smoot presented their first show, Jump the Gun. Since then they have played fringe theatres throughout Canada, Off Broadway at the Astor Place Theatre, regional theatres and festivals, the American Repertory Theater, associate artist positions at the Yale Repertory Theater, La Jolla Playhouse, Dallas Theatre Centre, Baltimore Centre Stage, and Israeli and Palestinian festivals culminating with a joint workshop for Israelis and Palestinians together. In addition to theatre, Mump and Smoot have made numerous television appearances and two short films, including Laurie Lynd's The Fairy Who Didn't Want to Be a Fairy Anymore.

Their early press defined them as horror clowns, a title they appreciated. Turner and Kennard had been horror fans before they had met, and used that genre's techniques to make their clowning more exciting. In their writer's credo of the beliefs which informed their work, the strongest concept was fear, which they've tried to explore throughout their partnership. This visceral excitement is balanced with comedy and naiveté, so that audiences are repeatedly moved from laughter to disgust to sorrow.

Their early shows often featured Debbie Tidy as Wog, an evil stage manager who served as a foil for the duo, while later shows replaced Wog with Zug, a ringmaster figure played by Rick Kunst.

Outside their Mump and Smoot personae, Kennard and Turner ran The SPACE (Studio for Physical and Clown Exploration) in Toronto from 1997 through 2002, where they not only worked on their shows, but also taught clown and presented workshops, student theater, and other productions. Along with Hines, they continue to present workshops and courses in clown, movement, and physical comedy.

Following the successful tour of Flux in 2002, the duo retired the act for several years. They each taught clown, Turner at his "Clown Farm" on Manitoulin Island in northern Ontario, and Kennard at the University of Alberta in Edmonton. They began working on Cracked with Hines and Morrison around 2007, collaborating during vacations and through long-distance phone calls.

Turner's home was destroyed by a fire on January 4, 2014, which also destroyed his clown costumes, props, and records of past performances.

== Background ==
Mump and Smoot live on the planet Ummo and worship the deity Ummo, as long as he might be responsive to their prayers. Their dialogue is in their native language of Ummonian, which is nevertheless clear to the audience (who often play a part in the performance). They combine influences from sources including Monty Python, the Three Stooges, I Love Lucy, Alfred Jarry, Samuel Beckett, and Antonin Artaud to elicit in their audience the peculiar mix of sympathy, empathy, schadenfreude, and horror that stem from watching flawed individuals alternately fail and succeed at their petty but all too human schemes. Mump and Smoot shows are said to seem so spontaneous that people sometimes forget that they are scripted and scrupulously directed. To obtain this effect, Kennard and Turner use an improvisational technique rooted in an art called Canadian clown, developed by Richard Pochinko in the 1980s. Pochinko's style borrowed from many clowning traditions and other creativity sources.

Kennard and Turner have also trained with movement coach Fiona Griffiths and clown teacher Ian Wallace. Workshops with Philippe Gaulier in Bouffon and John Towsen in physical comedy have also been influential.

Mump (the Joey), played by Kennard, is the natural leader; authoritative, pompous, bullying, scheming and manipulative, alternately erupting in towering violent rages and completely collapsing from terror. Smoot (the Auguste), played by Turner, is the perpetual innocent; playful, childlike, silly, bullied by Mump but occasionally standing up to him.

The plays occur in a world of surrealistic set design, with simple props combined with haunting and evocative music (by Greg Morrison) and sound effects providing an overall impression of a vast and uncaring universe inhabited by powers beyond the scale of mere Ummonians.

The characters draw the audience in by directly interacting with them in a responsive manner, which may underline their haplessness at the whims of social pressure.

== Productions ==
- Jump the Gun (1988)
- The Dentist (1989)
- Something (1989)
- Caged (1990)
- Ferno (1992)
- Pitooey (1995)
- Tense (1997)
- Something Else (1998)
- Mump and Smoot in Flux (2002)
- Cracked (2010)
- Anything (2014)
- Exit (2024)

== Awards ==
At the 1st Canadian Comedy Awards in 2000, Mump and Smoot won the award for Best Live Performance for Inferno.

Their 2002 production Mump and Smoot in Flux won two Dora Mavor Moore Awards in 2003, for Outstanding Production and Best Direction (Hines) in the independent theatre division, and was nominated for a Canadian Comedy Award for Best Comedic Play.

Mump and Smoot won for Best Variety Act at the 2015 Canadian Comedy Awards, where Anything was nominated for Best Comedic Play.

== See also ==
- Bouffon
- Evil clown
- Theatre of the Absurd
