= Richard Pochinko =

Canadian clown trainer

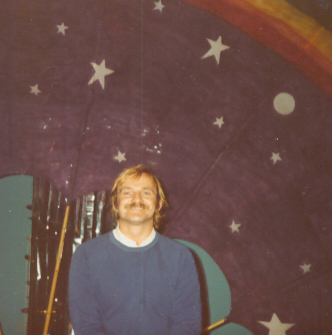
Richard Pochinko 1980

Richard Pochinko (1946–1989) was a notable Canadian clown trainer who developed a new style of mask/clown performance training, known as the "Pochinko technique". Originally from Selkirk, Manitoba, he was based primarily in Toronto, Ontario and founded the city's Theater Resource Centre.

The "Pochinko technique" for which he is known combined both European and First Nations traditions of masked and clown performance. Notable figures who studied under Pochinko included Karen Hines, Cheryl Cashman, Nion, Tantoo Cardinal, Jan Henderson, Sue Morrison, Sara Tilley and the duo Mump and Smoot.

Pochinko was gay, and was the partner of Gabriel Manseau. He died in 1989 of AIDS-related causes.

== See also ==
- Canadian clowning
