= Bryce Hallett =

Canadian animator (born 1976)

- Born: June 1976 (age 50); North Bay, Ontario, Canada
- Occupations: Cartoonist, Animator, Director
- Known for: Ranger Gord Cartoons; History Bites; Animation Unleashed
- Website: http://www.frogfeet.ca

Bryce Hallett is a Canadian independent animator living and working in Toronto, Ontario, Canada. A graduate of Sheridan College's classical animation program and Canadore College's graphic communications program, Hallett has been creating numerous cartoons and animations since 1999, working under his business "Frog Feet Productions". His first job was creating the "Ranger Gord's Educational Films" and "Ranger Gord's Safety Tips" cartoons based on the character of the same name for The Red Green Show, created by Steve Smith and Rick Green, which aired on CBC Television and PBS.

Since then, Hallett has created numerous other animated shorts for sketch comedy TV series, including animation for Gemini-Nominated History Bites (created by Rick Green), Listen Missy (created by Jane Ford) and The Frantics. He has also contributed animation to numerous music videos, TV commercials across Canada and the United States, and films ranging from small Canadian independent films like "At Home by Myself...With You" (dir Kris Booth, 2009) and documentaries. Trained in traditional animation and graphic design, Hallett has been known to experiment with various styles and techniques, including photography, cutout animation, stopmotion, watercolour and other media and different computer software.

He is the illustrator of the book "Animation Unleashed: 100 Principles Every Animator, Comic Book Writer, Filmmaker, Video Artist, and Game Developer Should Know" written by veteran animator and "award-winning director of films for the National Film Board of Canada" Ellen Besen. Released in 2008.

== Selected works ==
=== Television ===
- The Red Green Show (Animator/ director of Ranger Gord's Educational Films, 23 episodes) (1999–2004)
- History Bites (animator/ designer, 11 episodes) (2003)
- Listen Missy! (animator) (2004)
- The Frantics (comedy) Reunion Special (animator) (2005)
- History Bites: Mother Britain (animator) (1 hour special) (2005)
- History Bites: Uncle Sam (animator) (1 hour special) (2006)
- History Bites: The Separatists (animator) (1 hour special) (2007)
- History Bites: Celine Dion (animator and also appears as himself) (1 hour special) (2008)
- What a Booty (Animator) (1 hour doc directed by Tantyana Terzoupoulos) (2008)

=== Music videos ===
- Howie Beck (Alice) (contributing animator) (2004) (dir by Tin Can Forest, aka Marek Colek and Samantha Ferguson)
- Robin Black (Why Don't You Love me?) (animator/designer/storyboards) (2005) Directed by Kris Lefcoe & Ghost Milk Studios. Animation by Ghostmilk, Bryce Hallett, Justin Lee and Chris Stone.
- Eminem (Shake That feat. Nate Dogg (contributing animator) (2006) ( dir by Plates Animation)
- Delica-m (Counting Stars) (Animator/Designer) (2010)

=== Feature films ===
- At Home by Myself...With You (dir Kris Booth ) (Animation by Bryce Hallett) (2009)
- Tall Girls: A Story of Giants (dir Edda Baumann von Broen ) (Animation by Bryce Hallett) (2011)

=== Bibliography ===
List of books illustrated by Bryce Hallett

Book	Year	Notes
Red Green's Duct Tape is Not Enough: A Humorous Guide to Midlife	2002	ISBN 978-1-57826-109-3
Animation Unleashed: 100 Principles Every Animator, Comic Book Writer, Filmmaker, Video Artist, and Game Developer Should Know	2008	ISBN 1-932907-49-1
ADD Stole My Car Keys (The Surprising Ways Adult Attention Deficit Disorder Affects Your Life... and Strategies for Creating a Life You Love.)	2011	ISBN 0-9866240-2-0
