= Chris Deacon =

Canadian film director

'Chris Deacon is a Canadian film and television director from Toronto, Ontario. She is most noted for her 1998 short film Moving Day, which won the Genie Award for Best Live Action Short Drama at the 20th Genie Awards.

She also received a Gemini Award nomination for Best Short Dramatic Program at the 11th Gemini Awards in 1997 for her short film Twisted Sheets, and Canadian Comedy Award nominations for Best Direction in a Film and Best Writing in a Film at the 1st Canadian Comedy Awards in 2000 for Moving Day.

She has subsequently worked principally in television, with credits including episodes of Our Hero, Degrassi: The Next Generation, Darcy's Wild Life, Radio Free Roscoe, The Jane Show, The Latest Buzz, Raising Expectations and Dino Dana.
