= David Zancai =

Canadian performance artist (born 1968)

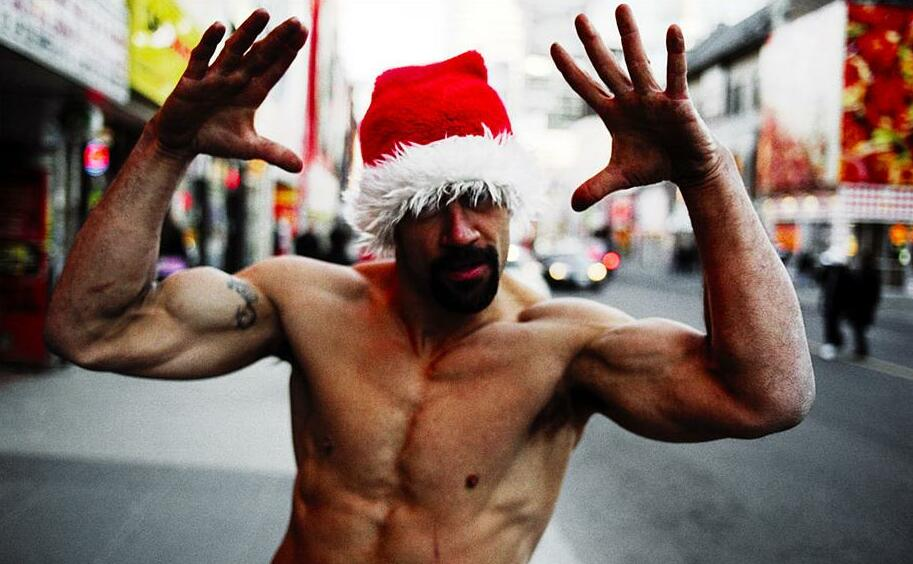
- David Zancai posing as Zanta
- Born: May 7, 1968 (age 58)
- Occupation: Busker
- Years active: 2000 - at least 2016

David Zancai (born May 7, 1968) is a former street entertainer from Toronto, Ontario, Canada. Zancai is known for his character Zanta: a modified Santa Claus who travels the streets of downtown Toronto doing pushups and shouting "yes yes yes" and "Merry Christmess". His costume consists of nothing but shorts, boots, and a red-and-white Santa hat, even during Toronto's winters. He claims to perform this routine every day of the year except Christmas Day, and estimates he does 2,000 to 3,000 pushups per day. In 2000, Zancai fell 25 feet onto a staircase while working as a painter. He entered treatment for schizophrenia at St. Joseph's hospital, having been diagnosed with schizophrenia and bipolar disorder earlier in 2003. Zancai has received mixed responses to his Zanta character, and has been banned from several public areas around Toronto, including the Toronto Transit Commission.

== Media appearances ==
=== Citytv Toronto ===
For his first appearance as Zanta, Zancai showed up behind the street window of the CHUM-City Building and began performing. As a result of Citytv using streetscapes as backdrop to live news programming, Zancai was frequently seen in the background of the morning news and entertainment program Breakfast Television. Reportedly aggravated by Zancai's presence, CHUM filed a number of complaints which resulted in Zancai being banned from the area of the building. He violated this order, and as a result was banned from the area south of College St. to King St., and from Yonge over to Spadina Ave.

Since that time, Zancai has made appearances on Breakfast Television and claimed to have a verbal agreement allowing him to make regular appearances on the television series Speakers' Corner.

=== Documentaries ===
Zancai has been the subject of two amateur documentary films. In October 2005, graphic artists Muckney Tipping and Pietro Gagliano filmed Zancai describing his life events and motivation to become known worldwide.

=== Other appearances ===
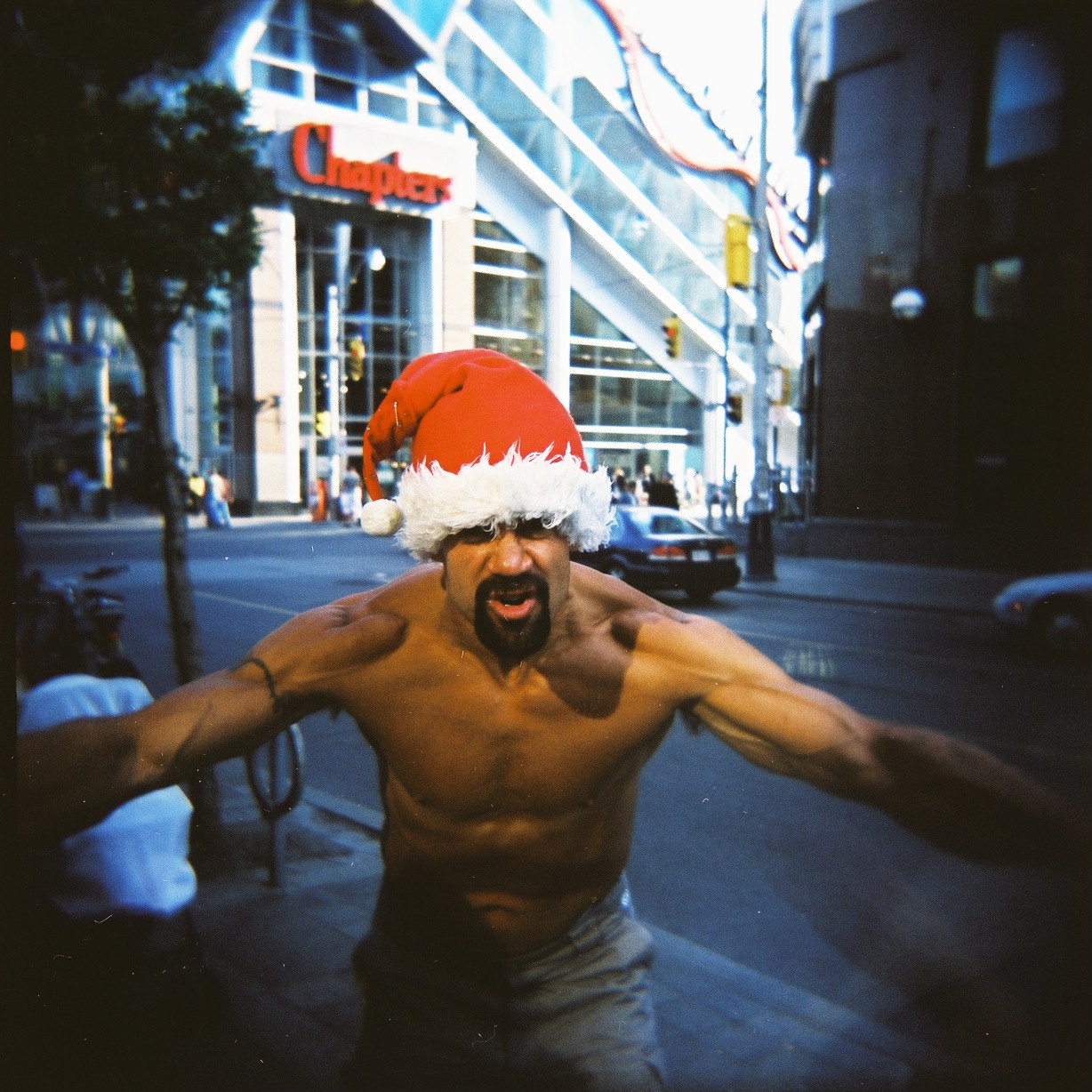
Zancai in his Zanta persona

- Zancai has attended several Christmas parades, pointing out that "Santa's at the back, while Zanta's at the front."
- Zancai guest-starred in Season 3, Episode 6 (Who Can Lift More Weight With Their Genitals) of Showcase Television's Kenny vs. Spenny as a replacement for Spencer Rice; Rice claimed he had a nervous breakdown during the episode's production.
- Zanta has followed actress Penélope Cruz around Yorkville, trying to get in a photo during the 2006 Toronto International Film Festival. He finally was photographed with Cruz and Michael Keaton.
- Zanta is one of the many characters profiled in Jason Kieffer's comic book, "The Rabble of Downtown Toronto".
- Jason Kieffer created a short story for Taddle Creek Magazine's Christmas 2009 issue called "Why, Zanta?...Why?...";
- In July 2012 Jason Kieffer published a full graphic novel about Zanta, titled "Zanta The Living Legend".

== Reception ==
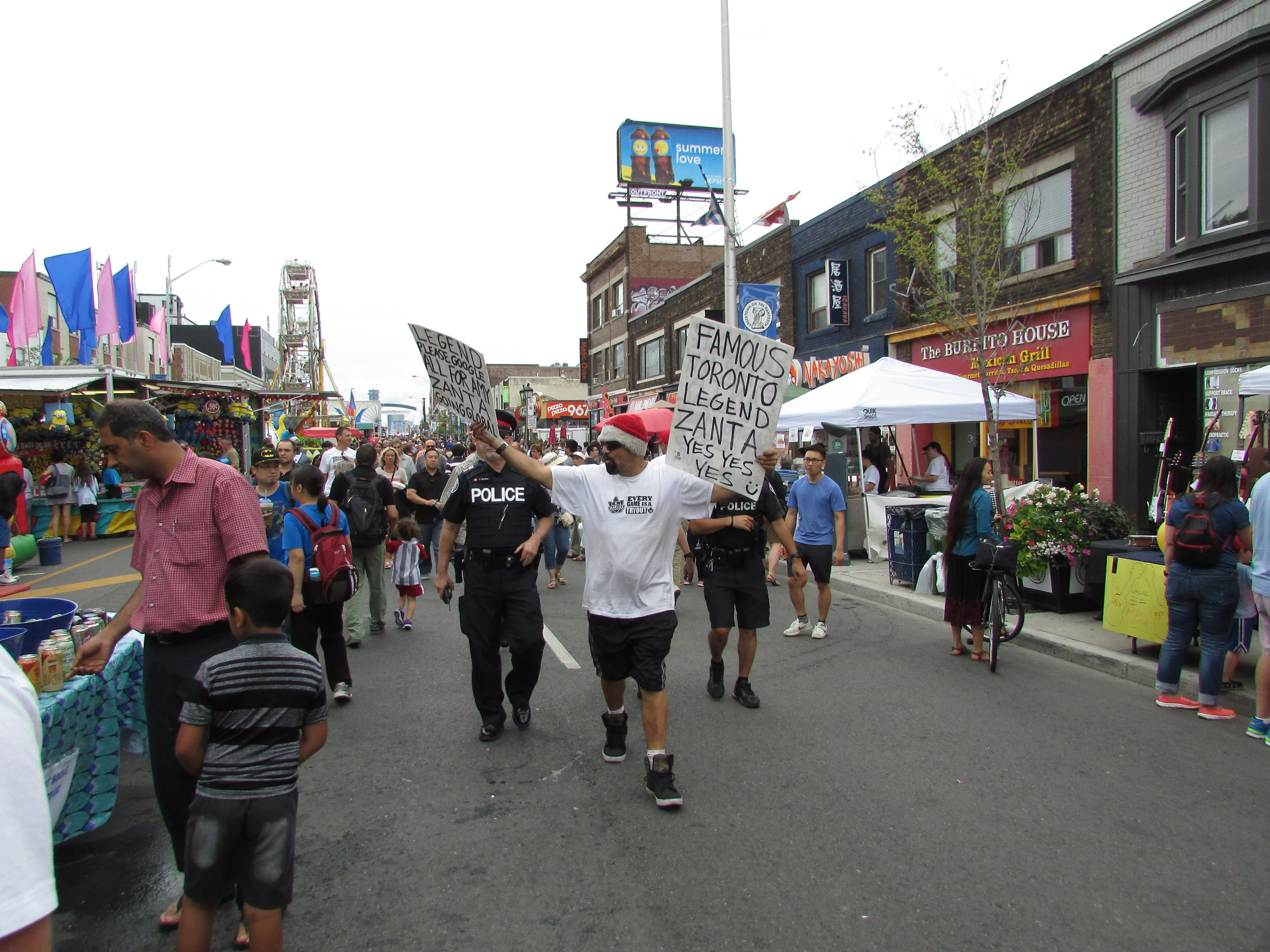
Zancai at Toronto's Taste of the Danforth in August 2015.

In 2005, Zancai's desire for fame and exposure resulted in at least one arrest on mischief charges. Zanta has claimed that on August 19, 2006, he was banned from the Exhibition Place grounds, in particular the Canadian National Exhibition, after performing in the Farm, Food and Fun building. On November 17, 2006, 680 News radio reported Zancai had been banned by the Toronto Transit Commission (TTC) from the city's buses, subways, and subway stations. Zancai is no longer allowed at the Toronto Street Festival, the Taste of the Danforth, the St. Patrick's Day Parade or the Santa Claus Parade. He has also been banned from Old York Lane between Cumberland Street and Yorkville Avenue in Yorkville, College Park, and Sankofa Square.

In August 2006, Zancai received a provincial probation order stating that he is "not permitted on any TTC property or vehicle other than surface routes" for two years. Most bus drivers in the city refuse him access to surface routes. Zancai is fighting the ban, with an attorney handling his case pro bono. Former TTC Chairman Adam Giambrone acknowledged there is no specific TTC bylaw against doing push-ups on TTC property, but has defended the ban by stating that such behaviour may pose a "serious safety hazard".

Adam Vaughan, then-councillor for Trinity—Spadina, has stated that Zancai is "a much-loved character when you don't have to do work around him" but he is nonetheless "probably a public nuisance," and that some people understandably take issue with his behaviour. In an interview with the National Post, Vaughan stated: "Just because you have a right to freedom of speech doesn't mean you have a right to an audience. And when you impose yourself in a public space consistently and without much regard for whether other people can enjoy that public space, boundaries are broached." Zancai's lawyer has responded by saying that Zancai is "entitled to be as strange as he wants to be" and has defended his right to make use of public spaces for doing pushups.

An article titled "Where's the line between mental illness and sexual harassment?", exploring Zancai's harassment of people, including sexual harassment, on the TTC, was published on the TVOntario website in October, 2015.
