= Michael McMurtry =

Canadian actor

Michael McMurtry is a Canadian actor. He is most noted for his regular supporting role as Cordell in the television series Godiva's, for which he was a Gemini Award nominee for Best Supporting Actor in a Drama Program or Series at the 21st Gemini Awards in 2006.

He also appeared in the films Last Night, Moving Day, Too Much Sex and Cake, and had supporting or guest roles in Catwalk, The Newsroom, Undergrads, 1-800-Missing, Murdoch Mysteries, InSecurity and The Strain.
