= Moving Day (1998 film) =

1998 Canadian short film

- Directed by: Chris Deacon
- Written by: Chris Deacon
- Produced by: Tina Goldlist
- Starring: Michael McMurtry; Brigitte Gall; Paul Essiembre
- Cinematography: Derek Rogers
- Edited by: Daniel Sadler
- Music by: Cyrus Sundar Singh
- Release date: September 13, 1998 (TIFF)
- Running time: 23 minutes
- Country: Canada
- Language: English

Moving Day is a Canadian comedy short film, directed by Chris Deacon and released in 1998. The film stars Michael McMurtry and Brigitte Gall as Scott and Amy, a couple who are moving in together for the first time, but must cope with relationship anxieties when the process reveals aspects of their personalities that they didn't previously know about each other.

The film premiered at the 1998 Toronto International Film Festival. It was subsequently broadcast on television, as part of Showcase's "Calling Card" night of short films by emerging directors in 1998, and as an episode of WTN's anthology series A Change of View in 1999.

The Globe and Mail's television critic John Doyle favourably reviewed the film, commenting that "I could see this becoming, say, a six-part sitcom (without a laugh track) that gently mocks young urban couples."

The film won the Genie Award for Best Live Action Short Drama at the 20th Genie Awards. It received three Canadian Comedy Award nominations at the 1st Canadian Comedy Awards, for Best Performance by an Actress in a Film (Gall), Best Direction in a Film (Deacon) and Best Writing in a Film (Deacon).
