= The Drowsy Chaperone =

1998 musical

- Broadway production windowcard
- Music: Lisa Lambert; Greg Morrison
- Lyrics: Lisa Lambert; Greg Morrison
- Book: Bob Martin; Don McKellar
- Productions: 1998 Toronto; 1999 Toronto revival 2001 Toronto revival 2005 Los Angeles; 2006 Broadway; 2007 West End; 2007 First National Tour; 2009 Japan; 2009 Second National Tour; 2010 Ogunquit; 2010 Melbourne; 2013 São Paulo; 2015 Hamilton
- Awards: Tony Award for Best Original Score; Tony Award for Best Book of a Musical

The Drowsy Chaperone is a Canadian musical with music and lyrics by Lisa Lambert and Greg Morrison, and a book by Bob Martin and Don McKellar.

The story concerns a middle-aged, asocial musical theater fan who, feeling "blue", decides to play for the audience an LP of his favorite musical, the fictional 1928 show The Drowsy Chaperone. As the record plays, the show – a parody of 1920s American musical comedy – comes to life onstage, as the man wryly comments on the music, story and actors. The fictional musical is about the intrigues surrounding an about-to-be-wed oil tycoon and a Broadway starlet.

The Drowsy Chaperone debuted in 1998 at The Rivoli in Toronto, and, after a 2005 run in Los Angeles, opened on Broadway on May 1, 2006. The show was nominated for multiple Broadway and West End theatre awards, winning five Tony Awards and seven Drama Desk Awards. The show has had major productions in Toronto, Los Angeles, New York, London, Melbourne and Japan, as well as two North American tours as well as Batemans Bay in New South Wales.

== History ==
The Drowsy Chaperone started in 1997, when Don McKellar, Lisa Lambert, Greg Morrison and several friends created a spoof of old musicals for the stag party of Bob Martin and Janet Van De Graaff. In its first incarnation, there was no Man in Chair, the musical styles ranged from the 1920s to the 1940s, and the jokes were more risqué. When the show was reshaped for the Toronto Fringe Festival, Martin became a co-writer, creating Man in Chair to serve as a narrator/commentator for the piece.

Following the Fringe staging, Toronto commercial theatre producer David Mirvish financed an expanded production at Toronto's 160-seat, independent Theatre Passe Muraille in 1999. Box office success and favourable notices led Mirvish in 2001 to finance further development and produce a full-scale version at Toronto's 1000-seat Winter Garden Theatre. During that production, Linda Intaschi, Associate Producer of Mirvish Productions, invited New York producer Roy Miller to see the musical. Miller saw potential in the show and he optioned the rights.

With Canadian actor and fund-raiser Paul Mack, Miller produced a reading for the New York's National Alliance for Musical Theatre on 5 October 2004 – and invited Broadway producer Kevin McCollum. The reading captured McCollum's interest and eventually resulted in Miller, McCollum and Bob Boyett, Stephanie McClelland, Barbara Freitag and Jill Furman committing to producing the play. An out-of-town engagement followed at the Ahmanson Theatre in Los Angeles (2005), and after alterations, The Drowsy Chaperone opened on Broadway on 1 May 2006.

== Productions ==
=== Broadway ===
The Broadway production opened in May 2006 at the Marquis Theatre. It was directed and choreographed by Casey Nicholaw. The production featured sets by David Gallo, costumes by Gregg Barnes, lighting by Ken Billington and Brian Monahan, hair by Josh Marquette, and makeup by Justen M. Brosnan. The original cast featured Bob Martin as Man in Chair, Sutton Foster as Janet, Georgia Engel as Mrs. Tottendale, Edward Hibbert as Underling, and Beth Leavel as the Chaperone. Throughout the course of the show, replacements for Man in Chair included Jonathan Crombie, Bob Saget, and John Glover. Upon Engel's exit from the production, Jo Anne Worley and Cindy Williams became replacements for Mrs. Tottendale, Mara Davi assumed the role of Janet once Foster left, and Peter Bartlett took over for Hibbert.

In his mixed review of the show, New York Times critic Ben Brantley said that the show "...seems poised to become the sleeper of the Broadway season, [though] it is not any kind of masterpiece," and that "...all the songs, while serviceably imitative of the 1920's, are forgettable." In a slightly more enthusiastic review, Variety's David Benedict noted that "The secret behind the success of Casey Nicholaw's exquisitely honed hymn to the forgotten musicals of yesteryear is that its authors knew exactly what they were doing when they took the broad out of Broadway."

=== West End ===
The Broadway team staged the West End production. Previews started on 14 May 2007, first night was on 6 June, but it closed on 4 August after fewer than 100 performances. A largely British cast, including Elaine Paige – making her return to the West End after six years – John Partridge and Summer Strallen joined the show's co-author Bob Martin recreating his Broadway role of "Man in Chair", with Anne Rogers, Nickolas Grace, Nick Holder, Selina Chilton and Adam Stafford. Later during the run, TV star Steve Pemberton took over the role of "Man in Chair". Novello Theatre's owner Sir Cameron Mackintosh, who had seen the show in previews in New York had supported its transatlantic transfer.

London's critics generally gave positive reviews of the show, although some were less impressed. An early drastic reduction in the cost of premium seating for the show failed to generate sufficient enthusiasm for the production, and the producers closed it in August instead of the scheduled February 2008 date. The Stage commented, "shows in London can run safely ... at lower capacities than they require on Broadway. ... But, as the transfer of The Drowsy Chaperone has just proved, sometimes even a Tony-winning Broadway hit can't even achieve that." The production received 2008 Olivier Award nominations for Best New Musical, Best Actress in a Musical (Strallen), Best Actor in a Musical (Martin), Best Theatre Choreographer (Casey Nicholaw), and Best Costume Design (Gregg Barnes).

=== North American tour ===
A national tour of The Drowsy Chaperone opened 19 September 2007 in Toronto at the Elgin Theatre. Among the performers were original Broadway cast members Bob Martin and Georgia Engel. While Engel performed with the company for the extended engagement, Martin did not continue beyond Toronto; his role was taken over by Jonathan Crombie. Nancy Opel played the role of "The Drowsy Chaperone". The Drowsy Chaperone played more than 30 cities in the United States, including Los Angeles at the Ahmanson Theatre, where the show ran before going to Broadway.

=== Subsequent North American productions ===
The Vancouver Playhouse Theatre Company mounted an independent production of The Drowsy Chaperone directed by Max Reimer, musical-directed by Lloyd Nicholson and choreographed by Dayna Tekatch in Vancouver, British Columbia. It opened 27 November 2008 and ran until 27 December 2008. The cast of this version included Jay Brazeau, Thom Allison, Debbie Timuss, Laird Mackintosh, Gabrielle Jones, Neil Minor, Shawn Macdonald, Mark Burgess, Nathalie Marable, Nora McLellan and David Marr.

In co-production with Canada's National Arts Centre English Theatre, the Vancouver Playhouse Theatre Company's production of The Drowsy Chaperone directed by Max Reimer played on the Shoctor stage of the Citadel Theatre in Edmonton, Alberta, opening on 5 September and closing on 4 October (2009) and thereafter played at the National Arts Centre though 1 November 2009; however, musical director Lloyd Nicholson died of a heart attack on the eve of the first performance in Ottawa, causing the production's run in that city to be truncated slightly as a couple of early performances were cancelled.

The Drowsy Chaperone ran 30 June – 11 July 2015 at the Cape Playhouse in Dennis, Massachusetts with Jo Anne Worley reprising her Broadway role of Mrs. Tottendale: the cast also included Simon Jones as Man in Chair and Bill Nolte as Feldzieg. The review of this production posted 12 July 2015 at BroadwayWorld.com stated "The Drowsy Chaperone is one of those shows that is inherently comical in its nature: it is literally laugh-out-loud funny, portraying the lives and actions of each of its characters as almost too absurd to be believed....The Drowsy Chaperone is really a beautiful show that is saturated with singing, dancing, some very odd characters and an almost too-simple plot that makes this show awesome."

=== International productions ===
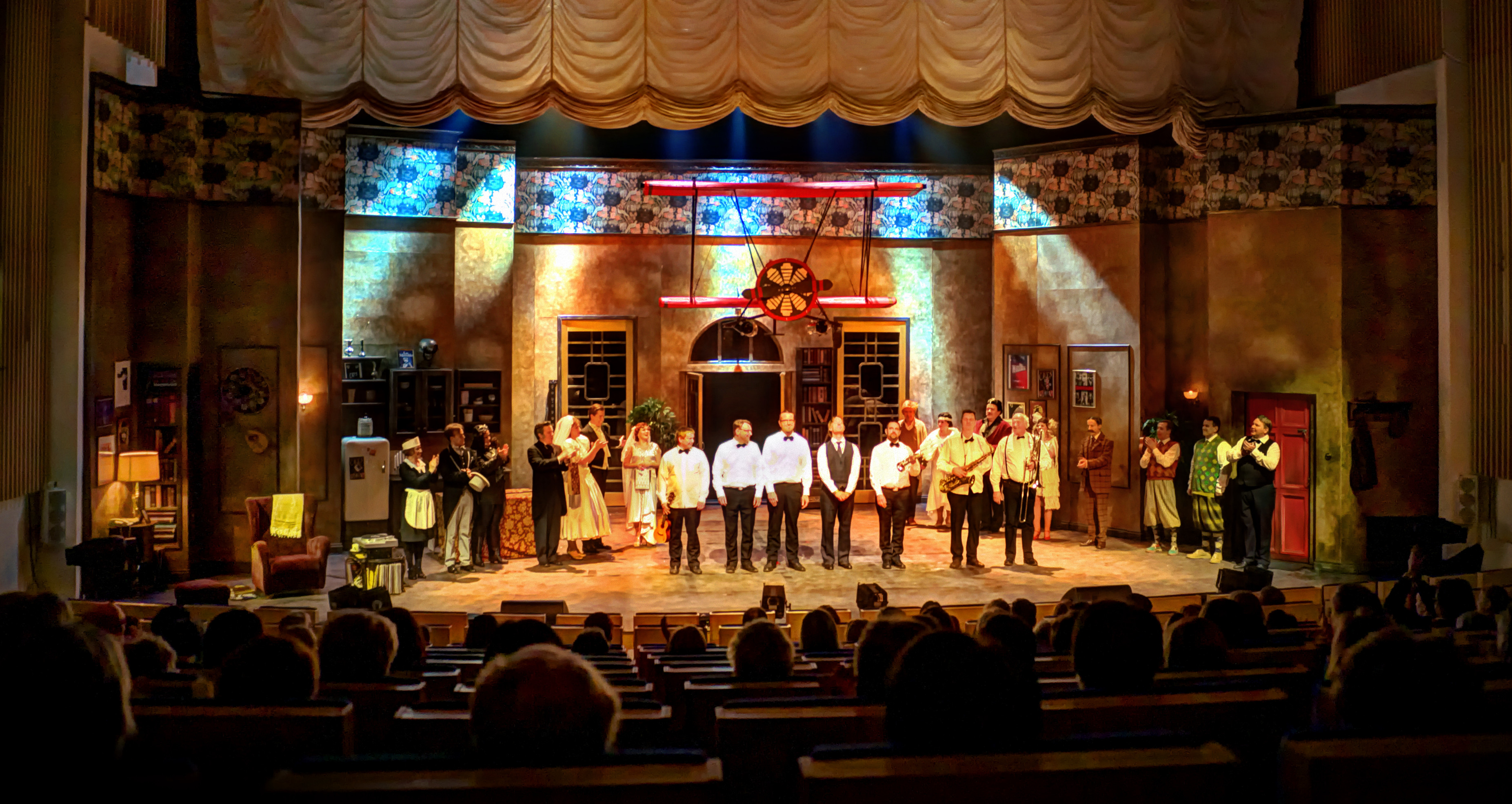
The Drowsy Chaperone in Imatra, Finland, 2016

The first translated production of the musical opened in Japan on 5 January 2009.

The Australian production, staged by the Melbourne Theatre Company, opened for a limited engagement in Melbourne on 21 January 2010. Prominent Australian actor Geoffrey Rush played Man in chair. The production was announced to run through 20 February, but due to impressively high demand for tickets when they were first made available, the producers arranged for it to continue through 27 February.

Ovation Productions and Alex Segal presented a production at Upstairs at the Gatehouse, off West End, 23 September – 31 October 2010. It was directed by Racky Plews, with musical supervisor Michael England, choreographed by Fabian Aloise.

The first Danish production of The Drowsy Chaperone opened 23 March 2013 at Fredericia Teater, running until 11 April the same year.

The Drowsy Chaperone was first translated to Portuguese in 2013, and performed from 17 August 2013 to 29 June 2014 in São Paulo city. In the cast there were popular Brazilian musical actors such as Ivan Parente, Sara Sarres, Stella Miranda, Saulo Vasconcelos, Kiara Sasso and Andrezza Massei. It was staged on Teatro Popular do SESI, and it was the first time a musical show had free tickets, due to sponsorship.

=== Amateur Productions ===
Licensing for productions of The Drowsy Chaperone is available through Musical Theatre International, which has also released licensing rights for The Drowsy Chaperone Jr., a condensed version of the musical intended for younger performers, as well as The Drowsy Chaperone Sr., intended for elderly performers.

In the early 2020s, the "Message from a Nightingale" scene was removed from licensed versions of the show in its entirety. At the same time, Janet's nickname for Robert was changed from "little monkey" to "funny bunny," prompting corresponding revisions to the lyrics of "Bride's Lament". The revisions extended even to the reference to the monkey's jacket on the pedestal, which was rewritten to describe the bunny leaving behind his feces instead. These revisions were made due to concerns that the original wording and themes might be considered offensive by some audiences.

== Synopsis ==
=== Act I ===
Man in Chair, a mousy, agoraphobic Broadway fanatic, seeking to cure his "non-specific sadness", listens to a recording of the fictional 1928 musical comedy, The Drowsy Chaperone, as he drinks. As he listens to this rare recording, the characters appear in his dingy apartment, and it is transformed into an impressive Broadway set with seashell footlights, sparkling furniture, painted backdrops, and glitzy costumes. Man in Chair provides a running commentary throughout the show from the stage, though he is on the audience's side of the fourth wall, invisible to the other characters.

In the opening number, "Fancy Dress", the premise and characters of the show are introduced: it's the day of the wedding of oil tycoon Robert Martin and Broadway star Janet Van De Graaff, who plans to give up her career for married life. Those in attendance include aging hostess Mrs. Tottendale; her loyal employee known only as Underling; Robert's best man, George; Broadway producer Feldzieg, who is hoping to persuade Janet to forgo marriage and continue starring in Feldzieg's Follies; ditzy flapper Kitty, who hopes to take Janet's place in the Follies; two gangsters disguised as pastry chefs; self-proclaimed famed Latin lover Aldolpho; Janet's alcoholic Chaperone, who is supposed to keep her away from Robert until the wedding; and Trix, an aviatrix who Man in Chair suggests to be coded as lesbian. Throughout the show, Man in Chair reveals information about these characters’ fictional actors:

Robert was played by Percy Hyman, the face of the fictional, cocaine-containing All Bright Toothpaste. Man in Chair expresses his admiration for Hyman, remarking he “[likes] to think of [Hyman] panting and sweating after a long dance routine”. The gangsters were played by John and Peter Tall. Kitty and Feldzieg were played by the acting couple Sadie and Jack Adler. The Chaperone was played by Dame Beatrice Stockwell, seemingly Man in Chair's icon. Janet was played by Jane Roberts, who was known as the “Oops Girl”, a girl whose “sexual energy was so strong it caused men around her to … spill their drinks, drive their cars into trees [and the works]”. Adolpho was played by Roman Bartelli. Trix is said to have been played by a black actress, which Man in Chair says was a progressive move for the time of the fictional production; no name is given for Trix’s actress.

The gangsters reveal to Feldzieg that their boss has invested in the Follies and wants to make sure the show is a financial success, which it presumably will not be without Janet. They tell Feldzieg that he must sabotage the wedding and make sure Janet stays in show business. Feldzieg enlists the vain, easily manipulated Aldolpho to seduce Janet and spoil her relationship with Robert.

Meanwhile, in his room, Robert realizes that he is nervous about the wedding. To get rid of his cold feet, he tap dances, and George, who is also nervous, joins in the dance (“Cold Feets”). George notes that tap dancing could be injurious, so he suggests that Robert go roller skating in the garden instead, while wearing a blindfold to keep him from seeing Janet. As George hypes himself up, the show is briefly interrupted by Man in Chair receiving a call, which he ignores (“Wedding Bells #1”).

Outside by the pool, Janet tells reporters that she is happy to be getting married and ostensibly doesn't want to be an actress anymore ("Show Off"), but her song evolves into a big production number with stage tricks and an encore.

In Janet's room, Janet is having doubts about whether Robert really loves her, and she asks the Chaperone for advice. The Chaperone responds with the extemporaneous "As We Stumble Along", a "rousing anthem to alcoholism", which, Man in Chair explains Beatrice Stockwell insisted on including in the show. More helpfully, the chaperone tells Janet that she is feeling "drowsy" and must take a nap, giving Janet the opportunity to ask Robert if he loves her. Janet leaves for the garden, and Aldolpho enters, mistaking the Chaperone for Janet. The Chaperone happily pretends to be Janet and allows Aldolpho to "seduce" her in the song "I Am Aldolpho", which Man in Chair says was his mother’s favorite.

Janet meets the blindfolded and roller-skating Robert in the garden, and she pretends to be a French woman, "Mimi," "from ze middle part [of France], where zey make ze toast." She asks Robert how he met his bride, and he describes their lovestruck first meeting ("Accident Waiting to Happen"). Carried away by his emotions, Robert kisses "Mimi" because she seems just like Janet. Janet furiously storms off because Robert has "kissed a strange French girl".

Kitty, hoping to take Janet's place in the Follies, tries to demonstrate her mind-reading talents to Feldzieg, but reads her own mind. The gangsters confront Feldzieg, threatening him with a murderous "Toledo Surprise" because he has not yet succeeded in cancelling the wedding. Feldzieg distracts them by insisting that they actually have singing and dancing talent, and they turn "Toledo Surprise" into an upbeat dance number. Aldolpho, with the Chaperone on his arm, announces that he has seduced the bride and the wedding is therefore cancelled, but Feldzieg angrily tells him he has seduced the wrong woman. Janet announces that she is cancelling the wedding, and Robert protests in vain that he only kissed "Mimi" because she reminded him of Janet ("Toledo Surprise"); the ensemble mourns Janet and Robert’s “happy wedding time” (“Act 1 Finale”).

Man in Chair announces that this is the end of the first act and the first record of the two-record set. (Note: There is no actual intermission in the show. The Man announces that he dislikes them and continues speaking.)

=== Act II ===
Man in Chair puts on another record, saying that the audience can listen to the opening of the second act of The Drowsy Chaperone, and leaves for the restroom. A scene set with characters in stereotypical East Asian costumes in a palace appears onstage, and the chaperone costumed as an Englishwoman in a hoopskirted dress ("Message from a Nightingale"). Man in Chair hurriedly stops the record, explaining to the audience that that was the wrong record – it was the musical The Enchanted Nightingale, not the second act of The Drowsy Chaperone. He finds the right record, and The Drowsy Chaperone continues.

In a musical dream sequence, Janet laments her lost romance and decides to return to the stage ("Bride's Lament"). Mrs. Tottendale tells Underling that the wedding will proceed as planned because "love is always lovely" in the end. She reveals to Underling that she is in love with him ("Love Is Always Lovely in the End"). The Chaperone announces that there will be a wedding after all: she and Aldolpho are getting married (which Aldolpho helplessly protests). Mrs. Tottendale announces that she and Underling are getting married as well.

Robert tells Janet that he loves her, and Man in Chair announces that one of his favorite parts is coming up. The chaperone gives Janet advice on what to do as Aldolpho drops his cane and the Chaperone says "l-ve while you can," in which the vowel in the first word is inaudible. Man in Chair has an emotional monologue where he expresses his wonderment about the phrase, asking if it says "live while you can," or "leave while you can." He shares a brief backstory about his unsuccessful marriage and about how you should never leave, only live. The scene transforms back to Janet where she admits that she was really the French girl and agrees to marry him. To appease the gangsters, Feldzieg tells them that he has discovered a new star: Kitty. He asks her to demonstrate her mind-reading talent, and when she "reads Feldzieg's mind", she announces that he is asking her to marry him; trapped, Feldzieg agrees.

George, now best man for all four weddings, realizes that he has failed at his most important task: finding a minister. Trix suddenly lands her plane in the garden to fix her “navigatrix”, announcing she is about to depart for Rio (“Wedding Bells #2”). Because a captain on board a ship can perform marriages, everyone rationalizes that Trix, as a pilot, can perform marriages on board a plane, and she can fly them all to Rio for their honeymoons ("I Do, I Do in the Sky").

As the record is about to play the show's final chord, the power goes out in Man in Chair's apartment, and a superintendent — who had called earlier in the show — arrives to check the circuit breakers. The power returns, the final chord plays, and the show is over. Alone again, Man in Chair, sufficiently drunk, sadly expresses his deep love for a musical that he has never actually seen. He begins to sing "As We Stumble Along" and the cast members, for the first time, acknowledge his presence, join in, and cheer him on ("As We Stumble Along (Reprise)").

== Musical numbers ==
† – not featured in original Broadway cast recording
‡ – cut from the show, though included as a bonus track in the original Broadway cast recording

Act 1

- Overture – Orchestra
- Fancy Dress – Tottendale, Underling, Company
- Cold Feets – Robert, George
- Wedding Bells #1 – George †
- Show Off – Janet, Company
- As We Stumble Along – Drowsy Chaperone, Company
- I Am Aldolpho – Aldolpho, Drowsy Chaperone
- Accident Waiting To Happen – Robert, Janet
- Toledo Surprise – Gangsters, Feldzieg, Kitty, Mrs. Tottendale, and Company
- Act 1 Finale – Company

Act 2

- Message from a Nightingale – Kitty, Gangsters, Aldolpho, Drowsy Chaperone (Note: While normally cut short, an extended version of "Message from a Nightingale" is included in the original Broadway cast recording.)
- Bride's Lament – Janet, Company
- Love is Always Lovely in the End – Mrs. Tottendale, Underling
- Wedding Bells #2 – George, Trix, Company (Note: "Wedding Bells #2" is called "George's Triumph" in the cast original Broadway Cast Recording.)
- I Do, I Do in the Sky – Trix, Company
- Finale Ultimo – Man in Chair, Company (Note: "Finale Ultimo" is called "As We Stumble Along (Reprise)" in the original Broadway cast recording.)
- Bows – Orchestra †
- Exit Music – Orchestra†
- I Remember Love – Mrs. Tottendale, Underling ‡ (Note: "I Remember Love" was replaced with "Love is Always Lovely in the End".)

=== Cast recording ===
A one-disc compact disc by the original Broadway cast was released in 2006.

== Principal roles and casting ==
Character	First Reading	Original Broadway Cast	North American Tour	Original London Cast	Original Australian Cast
Man in Chair	n/a	Bob Martin	Bob Martin	Bob Martin	Geoffrey Rush
Janet Van De Graaff	Jenn Robertson	Sutton Foster	Andrea Chamberlain	Summer Strallen	Christie Whelan
The Drowsy Chaperone	Lisa Lambert	Beth Leavel	Nancy Opel	Elaine Paige	Rhonda Burchmore
Robert Martin	John Mitchell	Troy Britton Johnson	Mark Ledbetter	John Partridge	Alex Rathgeber
Aldolpho	Don McKellar	Danny Burstein	James Moye	Joe Alessi	Adam Murphy
George	Steve Morell	Eddie Korbich	Richard Vida	Sean Kingsley	Rohan Browne
Mrs. Tottendale	Teresa Pavlinek	Georgia Engel	Georgia Engel	Anne Rogers	Robyn Nevin
Underling	Scott Anderson	Edward Hibbert	Robert Dorfman	Nickolas Grace	Richard Piper
Feldzieg	Matt Watts	Lenny Wolpe	Cliff Bemis	Nick Holder	Shane Jacobson
Kitty	Jennifer Irwin	Jennifer Smith	Marla Mindelle	Selina Chilton	Heidi Arena
Trix	Jennifer Whalen	Kecia Lewis	Fran Jaye	Enyonam Gbesemete	Zahra Newman
Gangster 1	Jack Mosshammer	Jason Kravits	Paul Riopelle	Adam Stafford	Karlis Zaid
Gangster 2	Doug Morency	Garth Kravits	Peter Riopelle	Cameron Jack	Grant Piro

Notable replacements (Broadway)

- Jo Anne Worley and Cindy Williams as Mrs. Tottendale
- Mara Davi as Janet Van De Graaff
- Peter Bartlett as Underling
- Jonathan Crombie, Bob Saget, and John Glover as Man in Chair

Notable replacement (London)

- Steve Pemberton replaced Bob Martin in the role of Man in chair from 10 July until the production closed on 4 August.

Notable replacement (North American Tour)

- Jonathan Crombie as Man in Chair (Crombie replaced Martin after the tour's launch in Martin's hometown Toronto)

== Show-within-a-show structure ==
The concept that the audience is listening to the musical on an old LP record is used throughout the show. As he listens to the show, Man in Chair is torn between his desire to absorb every moment of the show as it unfolds and his need to insert his personal footnotes and his extensive-but-trivial knowledge of musical performances and actors, as he flamboyantly brings the audience in and out of the fantasy. As the show goes on, more of his personal life is revealed through his musings about the show, until, as the record ends, he is alone – but still with his record of a long-beloved show to turn to whenever he's depressed.

At one point, the record skips, which causes the last notes (and dance steps) of a song to be repeated until the Man in chair bumps the turntable. A "power outage" near the end causes the stage to go dark in the middle of the big production number. Despite the show-within-the-show being a two-act musical, The Drowsy Chaperone is played without an intermission; at the end of the "show"'s first act, the Man in chair observes that there would be an intermission "if we were sitting in the Morosco Theatre, watching The Drowsy Chaperone. Which we're not." (In the original Broadway production, he added, "They tore it down and put up a hotel," an in-joke reference to the fact that the show was playing in the Marquis Theatre, part of the Marriott Marquis complex built on the spot where the Morosco stood). His monologue at the musical's intermission point ends when he changes records (ostensibly preparing the turntable to play the musical's second act), then leaves the stage "to use the bathroom". The new record is actually the second act of a different musical by the same composer and librettist, starring many of the same actors. Message from a Nightingale is performed in costumes evoking Imperial China, with the performers displaying clichéd Chinese accents and mannerisms. The Man in chair returns to the stage and replaces the record with the correct one for Act II of The Drowsy Chaperone.

== Parodies of musical comedy ==
The plot incorporates mistaken identities, dream sequences, spit takes, a deus ex machina, an unflappable English butler, an absent-minded dowager, a Broadway impresario and his Follies production, comic gangsters, a ditzy chorine, a harried best man, and Janet's "Drowsy" (i.e. "tipsy") Chaperone, played in the show-within-a-show by a blowzy Grande Dame of the Stage, specializing in "rousing anthems" and not above upstaging the occasional co-star.

== Awards and nominations ==
=== Original Broadway production ===
Year	Award Ceremony	Category	Nominee	Result
2006	Tony Award	Best Musical		Nominated
2006	Tony Award	Best Book of a Musical	Bob Martin and Don McKellar	Won
2006	Tony Award	Best Original Score	Lisa Lambert and Greg Morrison	Won
2006	Tony Award	Best Performance by a Leading Actor in a Musical	Bob Martin	Nominated
2006	Tony Award	Best Performance by a Leading Actress in a Musical	Sutton Foster	Nominated
2006	Tony Award	Best Performance by a Featured Actor in a Musical	Danny Burstein	Nominated
2006	Tony Award	Best Performance by a Featured Actress in a Musical	Beth Leavel	Won
2006	Tony Award	Best Direction of a Musical	Casey Nicholaw	Nominated
2006	Tony Award	Best Choreography	Casey Nicholaw	Nominated
2006	Tony Award	Best Orchestrations	Larry Blank	Nominated
2006	Tony Award	Best Scenic Design	David Gallo	Won
2006	Tony Award	Best Costume Design	Gregg Barnes	Won
2006	Tony Award	Best Lighting Design	Ken Billington and Brian Monahan	Nominated
2006	Drama Desk Award	Outstanding Musical		Won
2006	Drama Desk Award	Outstanding Book of a Musical	Bob Martin and Don McKellar	Won
2006	Drama Desk Award	Outstanding Actor in a Musical	Bob Martin	Nominated
2006	Drama Desk Award	Outstanding Actress in a Musical	Sutton Foster	Nominated
2006	Drama Desk Award	Outstanding Featured Actor in a Musical	Eddie Korbich	Nominated
2006	Drama Desk Award	Outstanding Featured Actress in a Musical	Beth Leavel	Won
2006	Drama Desk Award	Outstanding Director of a Musical	Casey Nicholaw	Nominated
2006	Drama Desk Award	Outstanding Choreography	Casey Nicholaw	Nominated
2006	Drama Desk Award	Outstanding Lyrics	Lisa Lambert and Greg Morrison	Won
2006	Drama Desk Award	Outstanding Music	Lisa Lambert and Greg Morrison	Won
2006	Drama Desk Award	Outstanding Orchestrations	Larry Blank	Nominated
2006	Drama Desk Award	Outstanding Set Design	David Gallo	Won
2006	Drama Desk Award	Outstanding Costume Design	Gregg Barnes	Won
2006	Drama Desk Award	Outstanding Sound Design	Acme Sound Partners	Nominated
2006	Theatre World Award		Bob Martin	Won
2006	New York Drama Critics' Circle Awards	Best Musical	Lisa Lambert, Greg Morrison, Bob Martin and Don McKellar	Won

=== Original London production ===
Year	Award Ceremony	Category	Nominee	Result
2008	Laurence Olivier Award	Best New Musical		Nominated
2008	Laurence Olivier Award	Best Actor in a Musical	Bob Martin	Nominated
2008	Laurence Olivier Award	Best Actress in a Musical	Summer Strallen	Nominated
2008	Laurence Olivier Award	Best Theatre Choreographer	Casey Nicholaw	Nominated
2008	Laurence Olivier Award	Best Costume Design	Gregg Barnes	Nominated

== Film adaptation ==
On 2 June 2014, director Fred Schepisi was hired to direct a film adaptation.
