= Chris Earle =

Canadian actor, playwright and theatre director

- Born: Christopher Earle
- Occupations: Actor, playwright, theatre director
- Years active: 1983–present
- Spouse: Shari Hollett
- Children: 2
- Relatives: Sam Earle (son)

Christopher Earle is a Canadian actor, playwright and theatre director.

== Career ==
Earle is best known for his 1999 play Radio :30, which won the Floyd S. Chalmers Canadian Play Award in 2001. His other plays have included Russell Hill, Runnymede, The Proceedings, Democrats Abroad and Big Head Goes to Bed.

== Personal life ==
He is married to actress and theatre director Shari Hollett. The two first met as members of The Second City's Toronto stage company, for which Earle has also directed. Their son, Sam Earle, is also an actor that starred on Degrassi: The Next Generation.

== Filmography ==
=== Film ===
Year	Title	Role	Notes
1983	Gentle Sinners	Eric	
2003	Rescue Heroes: The Movie	Roger Houston	Voice

=== Television ===
Year	Title	Role	Notes
1987	Fight for Life	—N/a	Television film
1988	Chasing Rainbows	Bruce	3 episodes
1991	Conspiracy of Silence	Const. Cousins	Episode #1.1
1994–1995	Wild C.A.T.s	Additional voices	13 episodes
1996	Due South	Car Rental Clerk	Episode: "The Mask"
1997	The Newsroom	—N/a	Episode: "The Campaign"
1999	Mythic Warriors	Prince Meleager (voice)	Episode: "Atalanta: The Wild Girl"
1999–2013	Rescue Heroes	Roger Houston (voice)	32 episodes
2006	Slings & Arrows	Damien	Episode: "Vex Not His Ghost"
2008	Super Why!	Voice	Episode: "The Foolish Wishes"
2012	Live from the Centre	Dave Cole	4 episodes
