= Bob Martin (comedian) =

Canadian actor and librettist (born 1962)

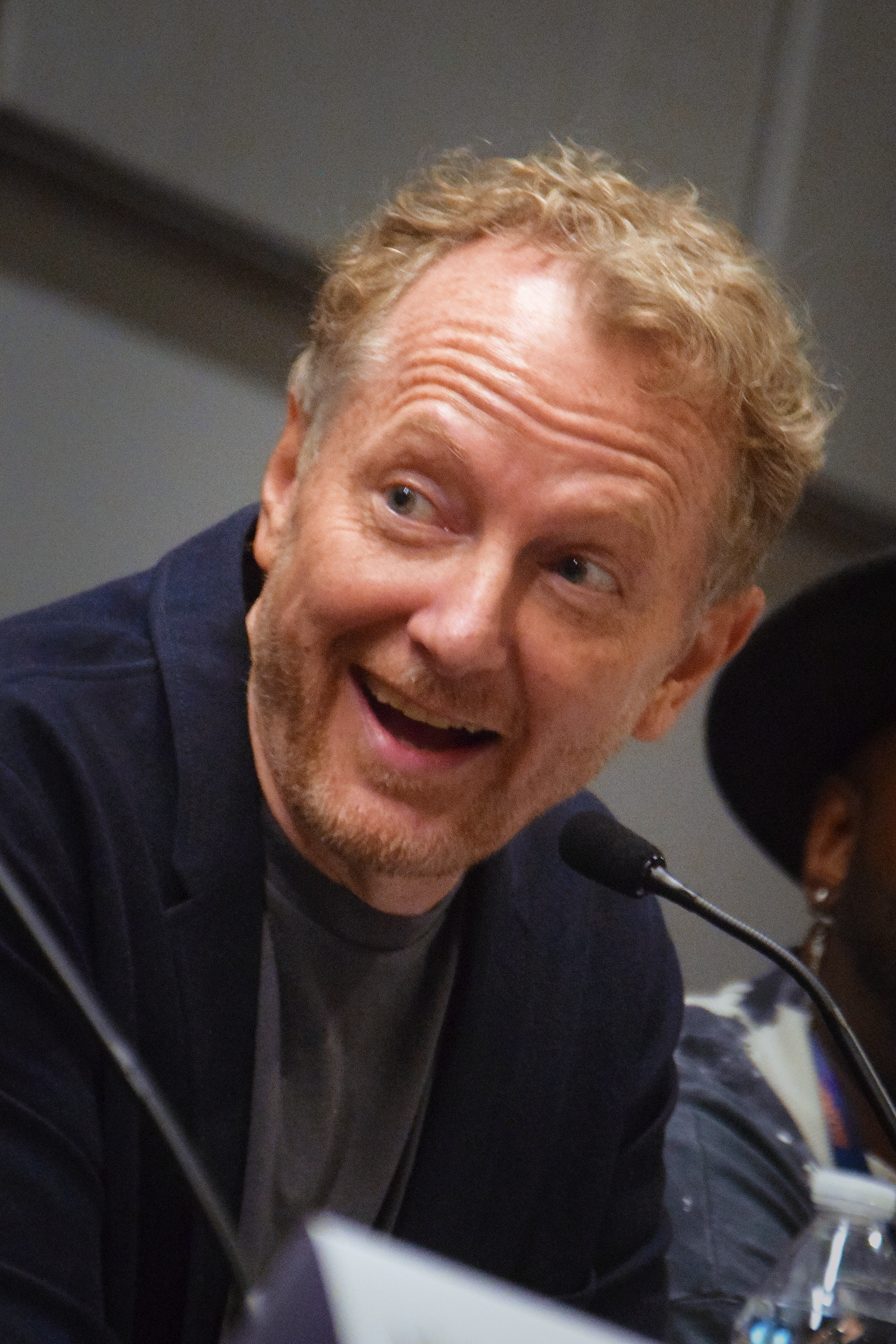
- Martin in 2023
- Born: Robert Martin; December 8, 1962 (age 63); London, England
- Occupations: Librettist; Actor
- Known for: Writer and actor, The Drowsy Chaperone; Writer and actor, Slings & Arrows
- Website: http://bobmartincreative.com

Robert Martin (born December 8, 1962) is a Canadian television and musical theatre actor and librettist.

== Career ==
=== Theatre ===
Martin began his career as an actor and director at The Second City in Toronto in 1996. He served as Second City Toronto's artistic director from 2003–2004.

In 2005, he made his Broadway debut starring as "Man in Chair" in the musical The Drowsy Chaperone, which he co-wrote with Don McKellar (book), and Lisa Lambert and Greg Morrison (music and lyrics). He was nominated for the Tony Award for Best Actor in a Musical and won the Tony Award for Best Book of a Musical with Don McKellar. He reprised his role in London's West End production of The Drowsy Chaperone, for which he received an Olivier nomination. Martin then kicked off the show's North American tour on its first stop in Toronto.

Martin wrote the book for the musical Minsky's, which premiered at the Ahmanson Theater in Los Angeles in 2009.

He returned to Broadway as co-bookwriter of Elf with Thomas Meehan, lyrics by Chad Beguelin and music by Matthew Sklar. Elf had two limited engagements for the holiday seasons of 2010 and 2012.

Martin wrote the book for a musical adaptation of the 1973 film The Sting, with music and lyrics by Mark Hollmann, lyrics by Greg Kotis, and direction by John Rando, who had previously collaborated on Urinetown. Additional music and lyrics were provided by the show's star Harry Connick, Jr. The Sting premiered at Paper Mill Playhouse in Millburn, NJ.

He collaborated with Beguelin and Sklar again for Half Time at Paper Mill Playhouse, which had premiered in Chicago in 2015 under the title Gotta Dance.

Martin reunited once more with the team of Sklar, Beguelin, and director Casey Nicholaw on The Prom which has its world-premiere at the Alliance Theatre in Atlanta in 2016. The Prom opened on Broadway at the Longacre Theatre on November 11, 2018. The Prom received seven Tony nominations including Best Musical and Best Book of a Musical for Martin and Beguelin.

In 2020, Netflix released a film adaptation of The Prom, which was directed by Ryan Murphy and starred Meryl Streep, James Corden, Nicole Kidman, Andrew Rannells, and Keegan-Michael Key.

Martin has written the book for a musical adaptation of The Princess Bride with Rick Elice, a sequel to The Drowsy Chaperone, and a musical adaptation of Night at the Museum with Shawn Levy.

Martin's latest projects include writing the books for two new musicals, Smash, based on the television series, and Boop! The Musical, a new musical about Betty Boop. He is also writing the book for the world premiere of Millions at the Alliance Theatre in Atlanta, GA. The show is directed by Bartlett Sher with music and lyrics by Adam Guettel.

=== Television ===
Martin co-created the award-winning series Slings & Arrows (TMN/Sundance), a TV show about a Canadian theatre company struggling to survive while a crazy genius director haunted by his dead mentor helps the actors find authenticity in their acting. Martin also served as a writer (alongside fellow writers and co-creators Susan Coyne and Mark McKinney) and a creative producer. Martin played the role of Terry in two episodes.

His first foray into writing for television was for the CBC Television series The Industry (formerly titled Made in Canada), in which he also acted.

Martin was also a writer of and starred in the Canadian television sitcom Michael: Tuesdays and Thursdays, which had its debut on CBC Television in fall 2011.

He provided the voice of Cuddles the comfort doll on the Canadian TV show Puppets Who Kill, aired on The Comedy Network.

Martin's improv background carried over to television with acting credits including Improv Heaven and Hell and The Second City Project. For the latter, Martin also served as writer and producer.

== Personal life ==
Martin was married to Canadian actress Janet van de Graaf.

== Works ==
=== Film and television works ===
Year	Title	Credited as			
Year	Title	Writer	Actor	Role	Network/distributor
1998–2001	Improv Heaven and Hell		Yes		The Comedy Network
1998–2003	The Industry	Yes	Yes	Tyler Hume	CBC Television
2002–2006	Puppets Who Kill		Yes	Cuddles (voice, 34 episodes)	The Comedy Network
2003–2006	Slings & Arrows	Yes	Yes	Terry	The Movie Network/Sundance Channel
2011, 2017	Michael: Tuesdays and Thursdays	Yes	Yes	Dr. David Storper	CBC Television
2014–2016	Sensitive Skin	Yes	Yes	Sam	Movie Central/The Movie Network
2015	The Second City Project	Yes (also producer)	Yes	Fictional version of self	Global
2020	The Prom	Yes			Netflix
2026	American Classic	Yes (also co-creator and executive producer)			MGM+

=== Theatre works ===
- The Drowsy Chaperone (2006, Marquis Theater, Broadway) – Music and lyrics by Lisa Lambert and Greg Morrison; book by Martin and Don McKellar; directed by Casey Nicholaw
- Minsky's (2009, Ahmanson Theater, Los Angeles) – Music by Charles Strouse; lyrics by Susan Birkenhead; book by Martin; directed by Casey Nicholaw
- Elf (2010, Al Hirschfeld Theatre, Broadway; 2012, Al Hirschfeld Theatre, Broadway; 2024, Marquis Theatre, Broadway) – Music by Matthew Sklar; lyrics by Chad Beguelin; book by Martin and Thomas Meehan; directed by Casey Nicholaw
- Half Time (previously titled Gotta Dance) (2015, Bank of America Theater, Chicago; 2018, Paper Mill Playhouse, New Jersey) – Music by Matthew Sklar; lyrics by Nell Benjamin; book by Martin and Chad Beguelin; directed by Jerry Mitchell
- The Prom (2016, Alliance Theatre, Atlanta; 2018, Longacre Theatre, Broadway) – Music by Matthew Sklar; lyrics by Chad Beguelin; book by Martin and Beguelin; directed by Casey Nicholaw
- The Sting (2018, Paper Mill Playhouse, New Jersey) – Music and lyrics by Mark Hollmann, Greg Kotis, and Harry Connick Jr.; book by Martin; directed by John Rando
- Boop! The Musical (2023, CIBC Theatre, Chicago; 2025, Broadhurst Theatre, Broadway) – Music by David Foster; lyrics by Susan Birkenhead; book by Martin; directed by Jerry Mitchell
- Smash (2025, Imperial Theatre, Broadway) – Music by Marc Shaiman; lyrics by Scott Wittman; book by Martin and Rick Elice; directed by Susan Stroman
- Millions (2025, Alliance Theatre, Atlanta) – Music and lyrics by Adam Guettel; book by Martin; directed by Bartlett Sher

== Awards and nominations ==
Year	Award	Category	Work	Result
2000	Canadian Comedy Awards	Television - Writing - Episode or Special	Comedy Now!	Nominated
2001	Canadian Comedy Awards	Television - Pretty Funny Writing - Series	Twitch City	Nominated
2002	Canadian Comedy Awards	Television - Pretty Funny Writing - Series	Made in Canada	Nominated
2002	Canadian Comedy Awards	Television - Pretty Funny Writing - Special or Episode (For episode "Alan's Ex")	Made in Canada	Won
2003	Gemini Awards	Best Writing in a Comedy or Variety Program or Series	Made in Canada	Nominated
2004	Gemini Awards	Best Writing in a Dramatic Series	Slings & Arrows	Nominated
2004	Writers Guild of Canada	Drama Series	Slings & Arrows (For episode "Madness in Great Ones")	Nominated
2004	Writers Guild of Canada	Drama Series	Slings & Arrows (For episode "Geoffrey's Return")	Nominated
2004	Writers Guild of Canada	Drama Series	Slings & Arrows (For episode "Outrageous Fortune")	Won
2005	Canadian Comedy Awards	Television - Pretty Funny Writing - Series	Slings & Arrows	Won
2006	Gemini Awards	Best Writing in a Dramatic Series	Slings & Arrows	Won
2006	Writers Guild of Canada	Drama Series (One Hour)	Slings & Arrows (For episode "Fair is Foul and Foul is Fair")	Nominated
2006	Writers Guild of Canada	Drama Series (One Hour)	Slings & Arrows (For episode "Steeped in Blood")	Won
2006	Tony Award	Best Book of a Musical	The Drowsy Chaperone	Won
2006	Tony Award	Best Actor in a Musical	The Drowsy Chaperone	Nominated
2006	Drama Desk Award	Outstanding Book of a Musical	The Drowsy Chaperone	Won
2006	Drama Desk Award	Outstanding Actor in a Musical	The Drowsy Chaperone	Nominated
2006	New York Drama Critics' Circle	Best Musical	The Drowsy Chaperone	Won
2006	Theatre World Award	Theatre World Award	The Drowsy Chaperone	Won
2007	Gemini Awards	Best Writing in a Dramatic Series	Slings & Arrows (For episode "The Way Madness Lies")	Won
2007	Writers Guild of Canada	Drama Series (One Hour)	Slings & Arrows (For episode "The Way Madness Lies")	Won
2008	Olivier Awards	Best New Musical	The Drowsy Chaperone	Nominated
2008	Olivier Awards	Best Actor in a Musical	The Drowsy Chaperone	Nominated
2012	Canadian Comedy Awards	Best Writing - Television Program or Series	Michael: Tuesdays & Thursdays	Nominated
2012	Canadian Comedy Awards	Best Performance by a Male - Television	Michael: Tuesdays & Thursdays	Nominated
2013	Canadian Screen Awards	Best Comedy Program or Series	Michael: Tuesdays & Thursdays	Nominated
2013	Canadian Screen Awards	Best Performance by an Actor in a Continuing Leading Comedic Role	Michael: Tuesdays & Thursdays	Nominated
2013	Gemini Awards	Bell Media Award for Best Comedy Program or Series	Michael: Tuesdays & Thursdays	Nominated
2019	Tony Award	Best Book of a Musical	The Prom	Nominated
2019	Drama Desk Award	Outstanding Book of a Musical	The Prom	Nominated
2025	Drama Desk Award	Outstanding Book of a Musical	Boop! The Musical	Nominated

== Recurring collaborators ==
Martin's theatrical works are often directed and choreographed by Casey Nicholaw. He often partners with the music and lyrics team of Chad Beguelin and Matthew Sklar, sometimes co-writing the book with Beguelin. Martin's first three musicals that premiered on Broadway included Beth Leavel in the cast. He has collaborated with Don McKellar, Mark McKinney, and Susan Coyne on Slings & Arrows and Michael: Every Day, and with McKellar on The Drowsy Chaperone.
