= Speakers Corner (TV series) =

Canadian television series

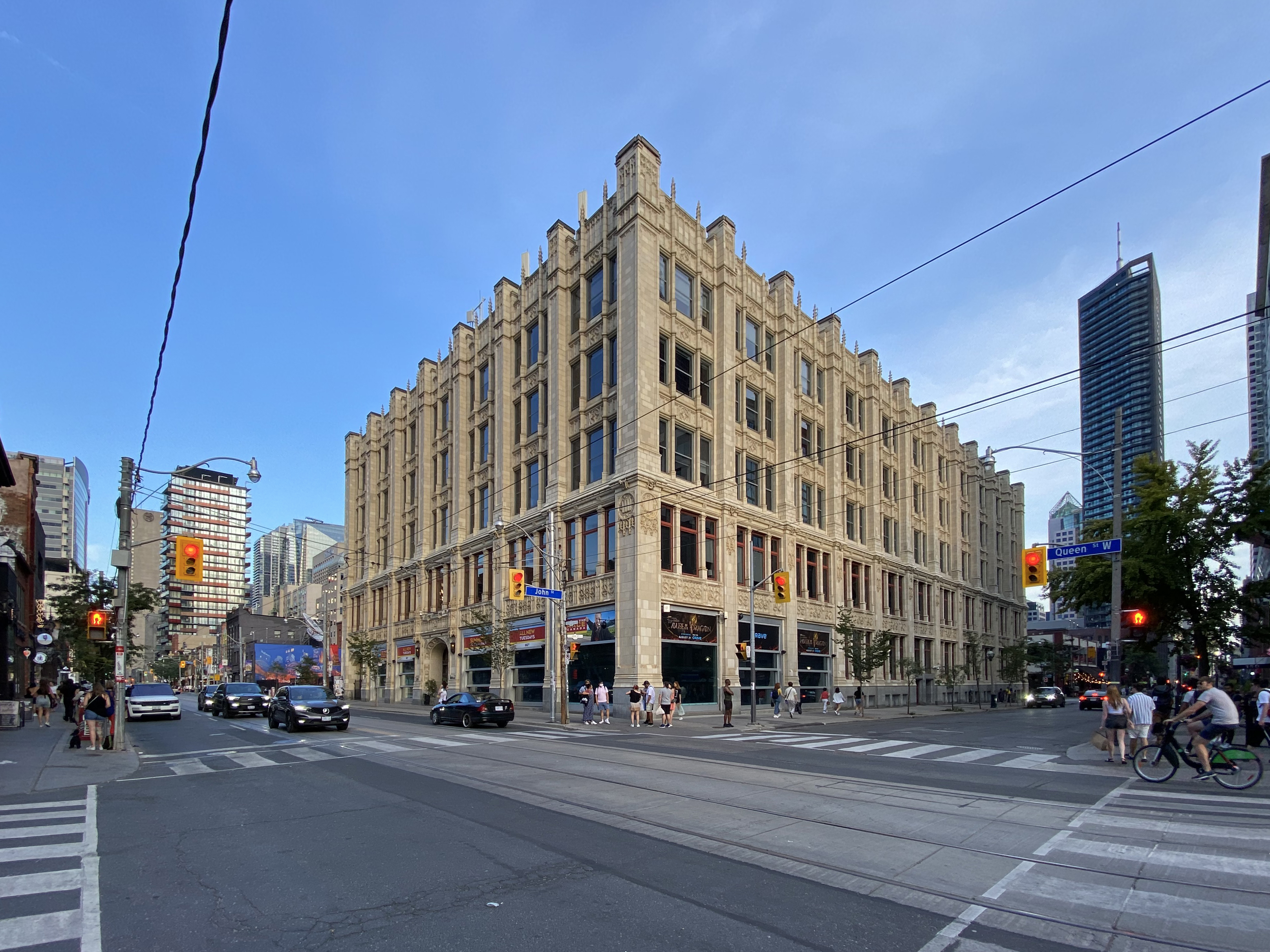
299 Queen Street West, the former headquarters of CHUM Limited and Citytv Toronto, where the old Speakers Corner booth was previously located, seen in 2022

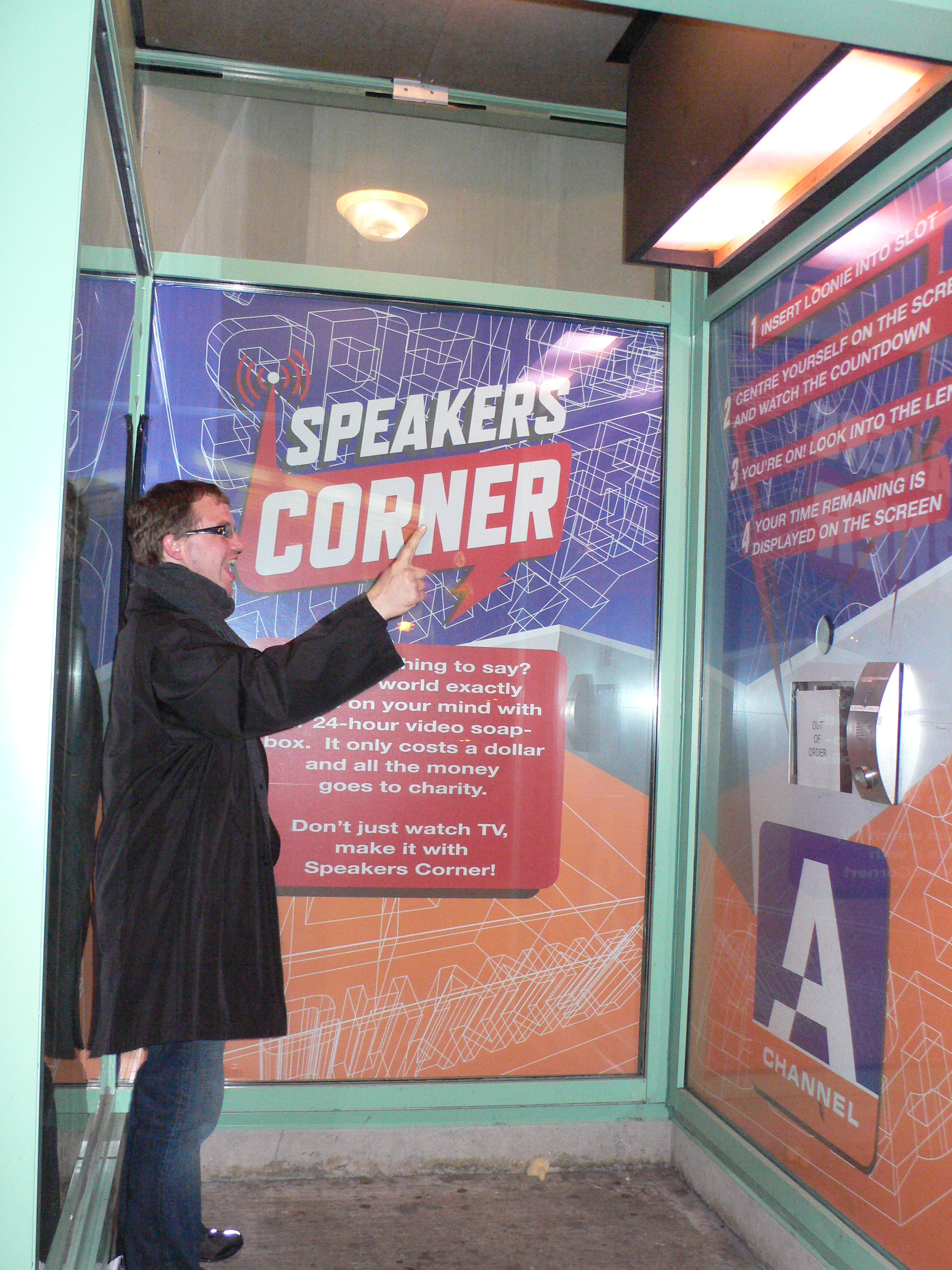
A man speaking towards the camera in an A-Channel Ottawa Speakers Corner Booth

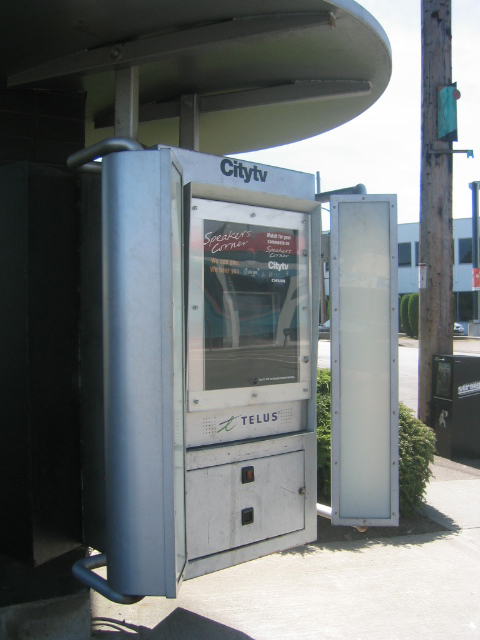
A Speakers Corner booth at the Citytv Vancouver building

Speakers Corner is a brand owned by Rogers Media that is used for its television segments airing on Citytv in Canada. The namesake television series aired weekly on CHUM Limited's television stations Citytv and A (formerly A-Channel) stations as well as CP24 in Canada from 1990 to 2008, featuring numerous short segments on a variety of topics as recorded by members of the general public in the form of rants, big-ups, shoutouts, jokes, music performances, etc. After the video was complete, it was edited for television.

The show was an example of Citytv founder Moses Znaimer's philosophy of interactive broadcasting, and essentially created what some 21st-century media outlets would retroactively label as a precursor to YouTube.

Znaimer revived the Speakers Corner booth and its original format as VoxBox in 2022. The new booth is located on the ZoomerMedia's ZoomerPlex on Liberty Village.

== History ==
Speakers Corner began in 1990 with a video booth outside the Citytv studios in Toronto. The booth's original intent was for viewers to record news commentary and "letter to the editor" segments for broadcast on CityPulse, but the booth soon proved so popular, with many segments being recorded that fell far outside the initial concept, that the decision was soon made to create a full half-hour weekly series. Segments that were relevant in a news context continued to appear on CityPulse, and entertainment-oriented segments also sometimes appeared on other CHUM television outlets, such as MuchMusic and Space, as interstitials. (The concept pre-dated CITY, with Keeble Cable pitching the idea in 1970.)

The series' theme music was composed and performed by Graeme Kirkland.

Within the series, segments selected for broadcast would be organized around themes, with several clips on similar or interrelated topics airing together. Sometimes an entire episode would revolve around a single theme, while other times several distinct themes would be presented over the course of an episode.

Several local celebrities were created by the show. A largely-unknown Barenaked Ladies received some of their first widespread publicity, prior to the release of The Yellow Tape, by performing their future hit single "Be My Yoko Ono" in the Speakers Corner booth before a live show at The Rivoli in early 1991. This appearance came after their 1990 YTV Achievement Awards appearance, where they won Best Band of the Year on the program. The following year, they made a repeat appearance on the program in a bid to leverage their newfound fame into a publicity boost for Rheostatics' new album Whale Music. Musician Jesse Labelle also received his first significant break as a result of Speakers Corner, being invited to join FeFe Dobson's band after his performance in the booth was broadcast.

Actor Scott Speedman got his first opportunity to audition for a major film role, in Batman Forever, because of a Speakers Corner appearance; although he didn't get the role, the contacts and experience he gained from the audition opened up other opportunities for him. In later years, street entertainer Zanta used both Speakers Corner and performances outside the streetfront studio of Citytv's Breakfast Television as a springboard to local notoriety.

The Devil's Advocates, a comedy duo who presented themselves as devil-horned spokesmen for Satan, became a staple of the program with a recurring routine in which they responded to and satirized other Speakers Corner clips that had aired in the previous week. The Devil's Advocates, Second City alumni Albert Howell and Andrew Currie, became so popular that at least one special episode of the series was devoted entirely to their clips. For part of their stint on the series, Harry, a senior citizen who disliked their style of comedy, would regularly record videos criticizing them, which turned into an ongoing war of words between him and the Advocates. Howell and Currie stopped appearing regularly on Speakers Corner when they were given their own show, Improv Heaven and Hell, on The Comedy Network in 1998.

Some established celebrities, including Madonna, Harrison Ford, Mike Myers and Jean Chrétien, also recorded Speakers Corner segments.

Some recorded segments were too extreme for broadcast, including sexual or scatological situations, although some such segments were screened as entertainment at private staff parties. On at least a few occasions, CHUM staffers also used the booth as a way to go over their own manager's head with a request for a pay raise or a promotion.

Versions of the show began on other regional CHUM-owned television stations such as CHRO in Ottawa and CFPL in London. Citytv Bogotá (which licensed the brand from CHUM) also launched its own Speakers Corner booth called Citycapsula when it signed on in 1999; unlike the Canadian versions, Citycapsula is free.

An Alberta version, Speakers Corner Alberta, aired on Access TV from October 2003 until April 2008. In the fall of 2006 the Citytv stations in Calgary and Edmonton started airing the AccessTV Speakers Corner Alberta as they were both owned by CHUM. Speakers Corner Alberta was cancelled in April 2008 due to changes in both companies.

A French version of Speakers Corner, called VoxPop, operated at MusiquePlus in Montreal. It operated from the early 1990s until the early 2000s. An American version was tried in the late 1990s by WSMV 4 in Nashville.

Rogers Media, which had acquired the Citytv stations from CTVglobemedia in 2007, announced the cancellation of the series on August 31, 2008. According to the company, the 21st-century emergence of other interactive media, such as YouTube and social media, had diminished the cultural value of Speakers Corner.

Rogers revived Speakers Corner in a digital format on March 26, 2014, as a one-night only opportunity for voters to comment and offer feedback on that day's candidates' debate in the 2014 Toronto mayoral election. As of 2020, the Speakers Corner brand serves as an extension of CityNews broadcasts, but largely consists of a reporter asking questions of people on the street rather than self-recorded videos.

14 years after the cancellation of Speakers Corner, ZoomerMedia, a company run by former CHUM Limited executive and Citytv co-founder Moses Znaimer, launched the VoxBox booth in May 2022 at the ZoomerPlex in Liberty Village, effectively reviving the original Speakers Corner format. The booth, like its predecessor, costs a dollar and proceeds go to charity.

== Operation ==
Each Speakers Corner booth consisted of a video camera, recording technology and in most cases a coin slot. Any member of the general public could enter a Speakers Corner booth, deposit a coin (normally one dollar), then record a short video segment on any topic. Each segment was limited to a maximum of two minutes, but the content was determined by the person using the booth.

Typically, the Speakers Corner Alberta (as well as the ones in London, Ontario) booths were free, offered a few questions, and usually had a limit of 60 seconds.

The show's producers then reviewed the booth recordings and selected the "compelling" segments.

The broadcast segments traditionally were presented in a campy atmosphere, with each segment (such as "rants", "complaints", "kudos", etc.) being introduced over clips of B-grade 1950s and 1960s sci-fi movies. Later in the show's run, however, it took on a more polished feel, and included text messages on-screen from viewers during broadcast.

Money collected from the Speakers Corner booths went to charity.

== Booth locations ==
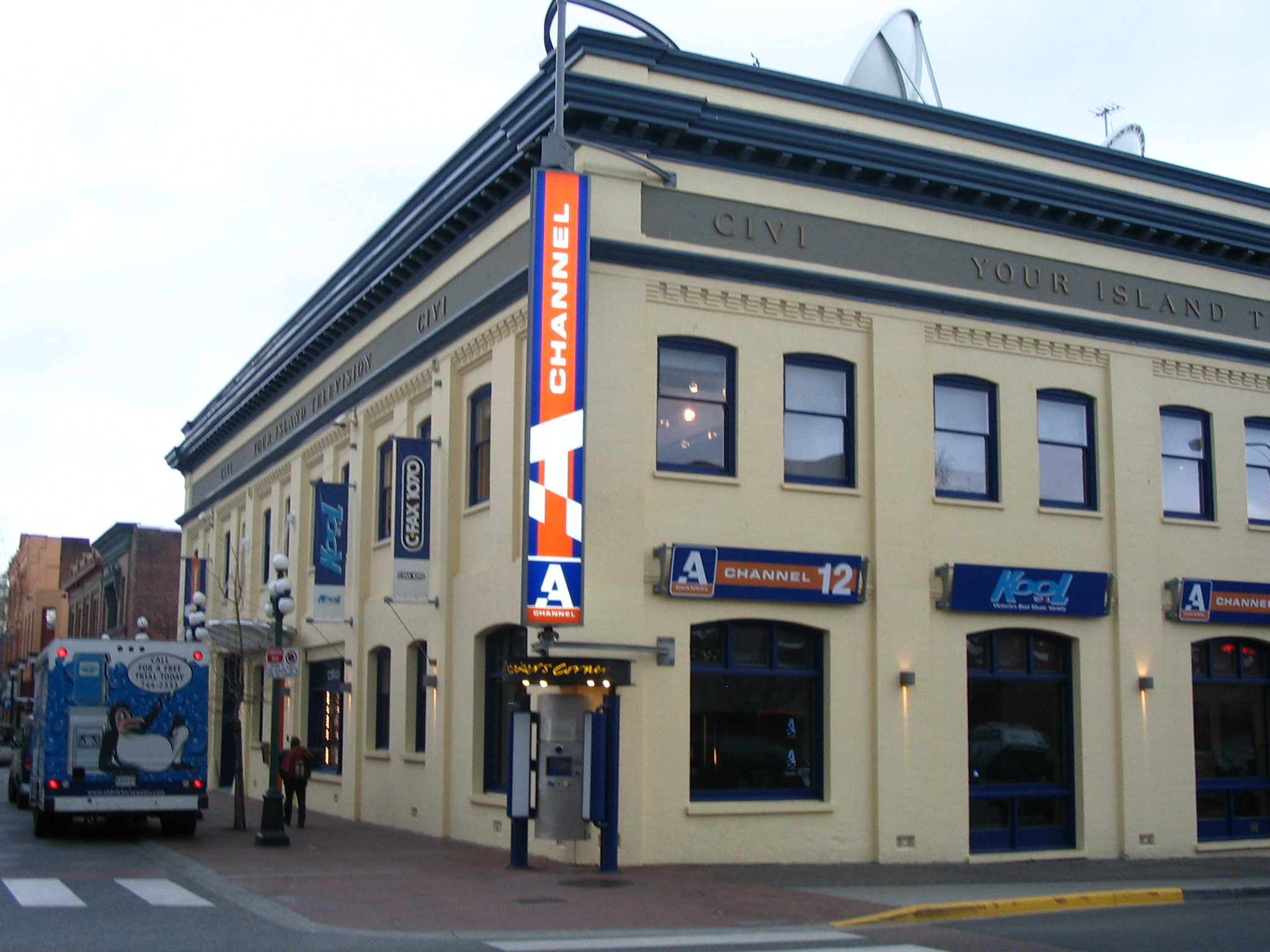
A Speakers Corner booth at the A-Channel Victoria building

Speakers Corner booths were located in:

- British Columbia
  - Vancouver (CKVU): 180 West 2nd Avenue (station building), Tom Lee Music on Granville Street, MarketPlace IGA at Smithe and Burrard Streets, plus outside Vancouver proper at Coquitlam Centre, and inside Famous Players SilverCity Metropolis Cinemas at Metropolis at Metrotown
  - Victoria (CIVI): 1420 Broad Street (station building)
  - Nanaimo (CIVI)
- Alberta
  - Calgary (Access, CKAL): 535 7th Avenue SW (station building)
  - Edmonton (Access, CKEM): West Edmonton Mall
- Ontario
  - London (CFPL): Galleria Mall and Covent Garden Market. Richmond and Oxford Street location was removed due to high vandalism.
  - Ottawa (CHRO): 87 George Street (station building); Ottawa-Pembroke Speakers Corner show is cancelled, its final broadcast aired 11 February 2007.
  - Pembroke (CHRO): Pembroke Mall; regular Speakers Corner show no longer airs (see Ottawa).
  - Toronto (CITY): The Jays Shop at Rogers Centre, interim location as of June 2008; previously the ChumCity Building 299 Queen Street West at John Street. A new booth was planned to be established at Citytv's new facility at 33 Dundas Street East, but the show was cancelled before this could happen. The ChumCity Store was also a booth location at times.
    - A new replacement booth is now located at the ZoomerPlex on 64 Jefferson Avenue at Liberty Village and is dubbed the VoxBox and opened in 2022. This booth is now operated directly by Moses Znaimer.
  - Windsor (CHWI): Palace Cinemas Building, 300 Ouellette Avenue (Southeast corner of University Avenue and Ouellette Avenue)

For other Citytv and A-Channel outlets, either there was no Speakers Corner program for that market, or the booth locations are not currently known. In Alberta, Access: The Education Station, which was the provincial broadcaster (now CTV 2 Alberta) owned by CTVglobemedia, operated Speakers Corner.

Mobile booths were also available to increase public access. These were occasionally deployed at special events but were not for private use. There were many requests to rent a mobile video recording booth for weddings and corporate events.
