= Todd Allen =

Canadian comedian

- Born: 31 May 1979 (age 45); Ottawa, Ontario, Canada

Todd Allen (born 31 May 1979, in Ottawa, Ontario) is a comedian, writer and producer based out of Vancouver, British Columbia and Los Angeles, California.

== Personal ==
Todd Allen grew up in Victoria, British Columbia with one year stints living in both Tokyo (1987) and Honolulu (1994). Shortly after moving to Vancouver in his early twenties, Allen started performing comedy in local comedy clubs.

== Career ==
His comedy act is continuously featured on television and radio. Past appearances include: The Late Late Show with Craig Ferguson on CBS, Comedy Now on CTV and the Comedy Network, The Halifax Comedy Festival on CBC Television, Madly Off in All Directions on CBC Radio and XM Satellite Radio.

He has been featured at the Just for Laughs comedy festival in Montreal, the Uno Festival in Victoria, and the Vancouver Comedy Festival. He made guest appearances on the television shows Men in Trees on ABC, Young Person's Guide to Becoming a Rock Star and Animal Miracles.

Allen also worked briefly as a writer for the television show "This Hour has 22 Minutes." In 2008, he won a Writers Guild of Canada (WGC) Award for his work on 22 Minutes. He is the creator and producer of numerous comedy game shows, currently in development in the US and in Canada. His one-man show, Who the Hell is Todd Allen?, tours in theaters and festivals across North America.
