= Lisa Lambert =

American actress and composer

Lisa Lambert (born December 1962 in Washington, D.C.) is a Canadian actress, comedy writer, and Tony Award-winning composer, best known for co-writing the music and lyrics to The Drowsy Chaperone.

== Career ==
Lambert played in the movies Childstar and Slings and Arrows. Her works for television include Getting Along Famously and Skippy's Rangers- The Show They Never Gave.

Lambert also took part in stage productions, including Mirth, People Park, The Irish Musical, The Drowsy Chaperone, The Bargain Musical, All Hams on Deck, Ouch My Toe, An American in Harris, An Awkward Evening with Martin and Johnson.

== Awards ==
Lambert won the Tony Award for Best Original Score, the Drama Desk Award for Outstanding Music, and the Drama Desk Award for Outstanding Lyrics for The Drowsy Chaperone. As recognized co-writer of the music for the Drowsy Chaperone, Lambert is in fact the first woman to win a Tony Award for musical composition.
