= Karen Hines =

Canadian actor, writer and director

Karen Hines is a Canadian actor, writer and director. She is the artistic director and producer of "Keep Frozen: Pochsy Productions." Born in Chicago, raised in Toronto, she now lives in Calgary where she was playwright in Residence at Alberta Theatre Projects from 2009 to 2012, has been a performer and collaborator with One Yellow Rabbit Performance Theatre, a National Magazine Award-winning contributor to Swerve magazine, and has created short films featuring the character Pochsy, which have screened internationally.

Hines has written seven full-length plays, and many short plays. Her longer published works include Drama: Pilot Episode, Hello...Hello (A Romantic Satire), Crawlspace and The Pochsy Plays, a trilogy of dark comedies, which have been Hines's plays have toured internationally and have won numerous awards and nominations. The Pochsy Plays were short-listed for the 2004 Governor General's Awards for Drama, and Drama: Pilot Episode was also short-listed for the GG in 2012.

Hines has appeared extensively in film and television, including many of Ken Finkleman's satires such as The Newsroom, Foreign Objects, and Married Life for which she was nominated for Gemini and CableACE awards. She has also appeared on stage in Canadian productions of Angels in America and with Douglas Coupland in his September 10th (Royal Shakespeare Company), as well as in her own plays. She also had roles in the film version of Hedwig and the Angry Inch and Barry Levinson's Man of the Year. A full history is available at Hines' production website (Keep Frozen is her independent development company, whose name she describes as a wish: a daughter of scientists, Hines combines such elements in her work as satire, magical realism, pink brand feminism and climate change.)

Hines has worked extensively with Canadian horror clown duo Mump and Smoot, directing all their productions from their early Fringe days to productions Off-Broadway, at the Yale Repertory Theatre and at the La Jolla Playhouse. She has directed and collaborated on the work of other Canadian artists such as Darren O'Donnell (Over) and Linda Griffiths (Age of Arousal). She is an associate of One Yellow Rabbit where she performed Citizen Pochsy and directed Mump and Smoot in the High Performance Rodeo as early as 1989.

Hines is a Second City alumna (Toronto), but her comedy has a darker component, which she honed through her work with Philippe Gaulier. She is considered a Canadian authority on Bouffon. Hines was also a student of Richard Pochinko.
