= Janet Van De Graaff =

Canadian comedian

Janet Van De Graaff (born April 5, 1965) is a Canadian improv artist and television actress.

She has worked with Toronto's The Second City and has played various roles in the TV series History Bites on Canada's History Channel.

She was married to actor Bob Martin from 1998 to 2018. Their namesakes are used as characters in the musical The Drowsy Chaperone, which was originally created for their stag party.

== Awards ==
She has won three Canadian Comedy Awards, for Best Female Improviser (2002 & 2004) and Best Female TV Performance (for History Bites in 2002).
