= The Neighbors season 1 =

The Neighbors
- Season 1
- Region 1 DVD cover art
- No. of episodes: 22

Release
- Original network: ABC
- Original release: September 26, 2012 – March 27, 2013

Season chronology
- Next → Season 2

The first season of the American television science fiction comedy series The Neighbors premiered on September 26, 2012 and concluded on March 27, 2013 on ABC. The series was created by Dan Fogelman and produced by Fogelman, Chris Koch, Aaron Kaplan, John Hoberg, Kat Likkel, Kristin Newman, Kirker Butler, and Jeffrey Morton. The series follows the Weavers (Jami Gertz, Lenny Venito, Max Charles, Isabella Cramp, and Clara Mamet), a family of humans who relocate to a gated community, which happens to be inhabited by aliens, such as the Bird-Kersees (Simon Templeman, Toks Olagundoye, Ian Patrick, and Tim Jo).

== Cast ==
=== Main cast ===
- Jami Gertz as Debbie Weaver (22 episodes)
- Lenny Venito as Marty Weaver (22 episodes)
- Simon Templeman as Larry Bird (22 episodes)
- Toks Olagundoye as Jackie Joyner-Kersee (22 episodes)
- Max Charles as Max Weaver (21 episodes)
- Isabella Cramp as Abby Weaver (19 episodes)
- Clara Mamet as Amber Weaver (19 episodes)
- Ian Patrick as Dick Butkus (20 episodes)
- Tim Jo as Reggie Jackson (21 episodes)

=== Recurring cast ===
- Patrick O'Sullivan as Johnny Unitas (7 episodes)
- Katherine Tokarz as Mary Lou Retton (7 episodes)
- Grant Harvey as Jeremy (6 episodes)
- Doug Jones as Dominique Wilkins (6 episodes)
- Alden Villaverde as Kareem Abdul-Jabbar (5 episodes)
- Robert T. Barrett as Jeff Gordon (5 episodes)
- Lora Plattner as Giselle Braxton (4 episodes)
- Kiersten Lyons as Billie Jean King (4 episodes)
- Stacy Keach as Dominick Weaver (2 episodes)

=== Guest stars ===
- Amy Farrington as Tracy ("Things Just Got Real")
- Meagen Fay as Principal ("Bathroom Etiquette")
- Maribeth Monroe as Rebecca Hill ("Larry Bird and the Iron Throne")
- Leslie Jordan as Carla ("Thanksgiving Is for the Bird-Kersees")
- Debra Mooney as Theresa Weaver ("Thanksgiving Is for the Bird-Kersees")
- Nora Dunn as Linda ("The Gingerbread Man")
- Michael Bay as himself ("Mother Clubbers")
- Sandra Bernhard as Ms. Porsche ("I Believe I Can Drive")
- Bethenny Frankel as Jill ("Mo Purses Mo Money Mo Problems")
- George Takei as Grandfather ("It Has Begun...")
- Mark Hamill as Commander Bill ("It Has Begun...")

== Episodes ==
- Jami Gertz, Lenny Venito, Simon Templeman, and Toks Olagundoye appear in all episodes
- Max Charles and Tim Jo were absent for 1 episode.
- Ian Patrick was absent from two episodes.
- Isabella Cramp and Clara Mamet were absent from three episodes.

No. overall	No. in season	Title	Directed by	Written by	Original release date	US viewers (millions)
1	1	"Meet the Neighbors" "Pilot"	Chris Koch	Dan Fogelman	September 26, 2012	9.22
A dysfunctional New Jersey family of five move into a gated community and later learn it is exclusively occupied by aliens from the planet Zabvron. The Zabvronians have lived in the community for the last decade. Being the first humans in the community, they awkwardly try to adjust and teach "humanity" to their alien neighbors while learning how to be a better family.
2	2	"Journey to the Center of the Mall"	Chris Koch	Dan Fogelman	October 3, 2012	6.32
Jackie Joyner-Kersee suggests enrolling Reggie and Dick in public school this fall. Debbie suggests getting the kids new clothes for school, so Larry Bird, Jackie Joyner-Kersee, Dick Butkus, and Reggie Jackson accompany the Weaver family to the mall where the Zabvronians learn how humans socialize, and the Weavers learn to appreciate each other's company.
3	3	"Things Just Got Real"	Luke Greenfield	Story by : Dan Fogelman; Teleplay by : Isaac Aptaker & Elizabeth Berger	October 10, 2012	6.39
Seeking a temporary break from their alien neighbors, the Weavers make arrangements to hang out with their human friends. However, Debbie brings Jackie Joyner-Kersee to girls' night, which causes problems when Jackie acts as though she is on The Real Housewives of New Jersey.
4	4	"Bathroom Etiquette"	Chris Koch	Dan Fogelman	October 17, 2012	6.53
It's the first day of school, and Marty and Debbie try to prepare their kids as well as Dick Butkus and Reggie Jackson, while Larry and Jackie feel insulted by the Weavers, feeling they think of them as "bad parents" and not wanting their advice; Dick reveals his true form to two bullies harassing Max, which gets them to back off as well as become afraid of Dick and Max, and the Zabvronians begin to appreciate the Weavers' help. At the same time, Marty and Debbie try to deal with the Zabvronians' lack of bathroom etiquette and the fact that they use their bathroom as a garden.
5	5	"Halloween-ween"	Chris Koch	Dan Fogelman	October 24, 2012	6.96
After plotting a trick-or-treat route for the kids for their first open neighborhood Halloween, the Weavers learn that the Zabvornians believe they are being invaded each Halloween for the last decade and prepare for "war" each time. Trying to properly teach the aliens, the Weavers try to inform the Zabvornians how to trick-or-treat. After letting the kids into the neighborhood, the aliens are afraid and, trying to be a great leader to his people, Larry Bird shows there is nothing to fear. Meanwhile, the Weaver children try to change their Halloween tradition and do different things: Max stops match-dressing with his dad, Abby stops walking with her parents to the door, and Amber sexes up her costume. After seeing they don't like the change, the kids rejoin the parents and enjoy the rest of Halloween.
6	6	"Larry Bird and the Iron Throne"	Peter Lauer	Dan Fogelman	October 31, 2012	5.78
While preparing Abby's birthday, Marty informs Larry how scary his wife can get planning a party. Jackie, who knows nothing of birthdays, has Dick share a birthday with Abby. Jackie, learning how birthdays work and trying to learn more of humanity, finds Debbie to frighten her more than the horrors of death and war she has seen in the universe. Seeing how terrifying Debbie can get, Larry "accompanies" Marty to his work and Marty lets him come out of pity from staying with Debbie. After all her planning goes down the drain, Debbie is told by the Zabvronians to take a break and let them do the planning as thanks for her kindness since her family came. At work, Marty trying to explain an honest days work to Larry, who knows nothing of it being an unquestioned leader, realizes he may not make it to his daughter's birthday. Larry, to show friendship, lets Marty go while he finishes his work in a faster manner. At home, Abby and Dick have fun with a party and have a wonderful time. Elsewhere, a man named Lou who got Abby's cake by mistake celebrates retirement.
7	7	"50 Shades of Green"	John Fortenberry	Kristin Newman	November 7, 2012	6.87
The Weavers find, one morning, after investigating with their neighbors into why the power is repeatedly going out, that the Zabvronians have entered their "Mating Season". The way they do this, as revealed by Amber is to make a spiritual connection rather than any kind of physical one, which gets Debbie thinking about the romantic aspect of her relationship with Marty, which seems to be non-existent. Meanwhile, after talking about it, and swapping information on the intimacy of the different species with Jackie Joyner-Kersee, she decided to try and involve Larry Bird in the human form of intimacy. Meanwhile, Amber is invited to a Make-out party and finds herself very nervous in the face of the act, seeking Reggie Jackson's help.
8	8	"Thanksgiving Is for the Bird-Kersees"	Chris Koch	Scott King	November 14, 2012	6.82
With Thanksgiving coming up, the Weaver's lament the inevitable visit of Marty's parents, what with his mother insulting Debbie's cooking and general household maintenance, his father's constant belittling of Marty and his accomplishments, and the gaudy sweaters their Nana brings the children, until Marty suggests they simply not have them over. While this is going on, the Bird-Kersees are witnessing the sadness of Jackie Joyner-Kersee who is going through a sad period as this time of year she misses her sisters. Guilt-tripped into inviting the Bird-Kersees, and prided into inviting his parents, Debbie and Marty respectively have both parties over to their home for the day, along with the workings of Reggie Jackson and Dick Butkus to release their aunts (in the form of a short homosexual man played by Leslie Jordan, and a short African-American woman) from exile for trying to overthrow Larry Bird who also attend. The day goes mostly as expected with lots of bickering, veiled-insults, and arguments, but as Dick gets the animosity to release between Marty's mother and Debbie, the day turns out to be for the better for all who attended.
9	9	"Merry Crap-Mas"	Luke Greenfield	Tracy Oliver	December 5, 2012	6.42
The Weavers ask the Bird-Kersees to hide the Christmas gifts they've purchased for Amber, Max and Abby. However, Marty and Debbie's kids feel they are entitled to the holiday gifts and the parents decide to return all gifts and go on a family vacation to learn the true meaning of the holiday. But Larry accidentally opens one of their gifts, which snowballs into a gift-opening frenzy among the aliens, and the Weavers are left with no gifts and no way to pay for the trip. This leads the Weavers to wake up on Christmas morning to find a living room full of carolers, Hawaiian dancers, a pig, and Larry dressed as Santa Claus bearing more gifts.
10	10	"Juan of the Dead"	Lev L. Spiro	Kat Likkel & John Hoberg	December 12, 2012	5.40
Juan, the neighborhood gardener, dies from a heart attack after accidentally seeing Jackie change into her alien form. Marty and Debbie must explain what death means to Jackie and Larry. Max also has questions about death and all attend Juan's funeral, where Larry uses his vial of alien formula to bring Juan back to life.
11	11	"The Gingerbread Man"	Chris Koch	Kirker Butler	January 9, 2013	6.65
The Weavers decide that they should volunteer for school activities—Debbie wants to join the PTA and Marty wants to coach soccer. This gets their neighbors involved—Larry with Debbie; Jackie with Marty. Jackie takes a more serious approach to coaching than Marty, to the point of kicking her own son Dick off the team as his performance is lacking. Both he and Marty make a more positive return to the team. Meanwhile, Debbie wants to break PTA tradition and make gingerbread men for the bake sale. PTA President Linda will have none of it. Larry and Reggie use an animatronic gingerbread man to scare Linda into giving up the PTA entirely.
12	12	"Cold War"	Henry Chan	Isaac Aptaker & Elizabeth Berger	January 16, 2013	6.09
The common cold affects the entire Weaver family and their alien neighbors panic. Larry wants to quarantine them all. Jackie wants to nurture them back to health. Reggie just wants to save his beloved Amber, realizing that custom-made care packages work better than lab-tested cures.
13	13	"Dream Weavers"	Bryan Gordon	Kristin Newman	January 23, 2013	6.42
The four parents chaperone Amber's and Reggie's school dance. Amber attends with the most popular guy at school, while Reggie, although still pining for Amber, attends with Gisele (Lora Plattner) ... and her turtle. Debbie and Marty reflect on their teenage courtship. They went to their dance with other people, but still fell in love with each other. Larry and Jackie create their own dance romance, complete with a fancy car and a 1980s tuxedo.
14	14	"The Back Nine"	Chris Koch	Kat Likkel & John Hoberg	January 30, 2013	5.27
The two families each obtain invitations to join a country club. The Weavers attempt dissuade their neighbors from joining by explaining to them about the exclusivity of membership. The discussion focuses on different social classes of humans and the Zabvronians' "equality" standards. Each family agrees the discrimination is wrong and neither join—until Marty later informs Debbie that he wants to join. They sneak away to attend the club's open house to see their neighbors later arrive. All argue about class again, until the Bird-Kersees are accepted into the club but not the Weavers. Ultimately, neither family joins because of the issue of stereotyping.
15	15	"Space Invaders"	Joe Pennella	Jeremy Hall	February 6, 2013	6.04
After taking relationship advice from Debbie, Reggie proposes to Giselle in front of the entire neighborhood. She accepts. Jackie intends on forbidding the marriage, but Debbie advises her to do otherwise. Jackie hopes Giselle's parents will also be against the marriage, but they are thrilled. The neighbors end up in a standoff, with Larry and Marty meeting in the street, only to have a civil discussion, rather than fight. At their respective homes, Jackie tells Reggie that he does not have to marry the first girl who reciprocates his affection, while Amber tells Debbie that she plans on breaking up with boring Jeremy. Amber then mentions possibly having feelings for Reggie, which causes Debbie to laugh, thinking she is kidding.
16	16	"Mother Clubbers"	John Fortenberry	Scott King	February 13, 2013	5.89
Larry wishes to become more attractive than his wife, after learning that, on Earth, he is not the measure of perfection that he was on their home planet. Instead, Jackie has taken that role. To prove to Debbie that he is indeed a man, Marty also gets a makeover.
17	17	"Larry Bird Presents an Oscar-Winning Film by Larry Bird"	Lev L. Spiro	Isaac Aptaker & Elizabeth Berger	February 20, 2013	6.34
Wanting badly to win an Oscar, Larry and Reggie videotape a spelling bee in which Max and Dick compete against each other.
18	18	"Camping"	Chris Koch	Kristin Newman	February 27, 2013	6.01
Both families feel the need to escape and go camping. The families encounter a bear and Marty craftily fends it off. Amber's continuing feelings toward Reggie are highlighted.
19	19	"I Believe I Can Drive"	Chris Koch	Isaac Aptaker & Elizabeth Berger	March 6, 2013	5.74
Believing that driving a car should be as simple as piloting a spaceship, the Bird-Kersees accept Marty's offer to teach them how to drive. Amber also cannot drive, but refuses the same help, and instead gets help from Ms. Porsche (Sandra Bernhard), the driver's education teacher.
20	20	"Sing Like a Larry Bird"	John Fortenberry	Tracy Oliver	March 13, 2013	4.72
Larry and Jackie ask Debbie and Marty to take them to a Broadway show. The Weavers decline, as The Phantom of the Opera bored them and others will probably be made into movies one day. Not dissuaded, Larry and Jackie attend on their own. Afterwards, they consider musicals to be "the best thing Earth has to offer" and stage their own musical for the Weavers. The performance ends with Dick falling into a well. Larry sees it as a metaphorical turning point. Meanwhile, Reggie sings about realizing he is still in love with Amber. Note: All songs in the episode were written by Glenn Slater and composed by Alan Menken.
21	21	"Mo Purses Mo Money Mo Problems"	Jeffrey Walker	Scott King	March 20, 2013	4.76
To pay for her multiple expenses, Debbie has a garage sale. During the sale, Jill (Bethenny Frankel), a tough-minded business woman, offers to sell Debbie's homemade purses. Jackie gets them in over their heads, when she makes a deal with Jill to sell the purses for more money, but they must make fifty extra purses by Monday. Meanwhile, Jeremy tries to get back with Amber by doing stupid things such as getting her picture painted on his car. Throughout this, Giselle repeatedly says that they are a couple again, which causes Amber to get mad. Dick learns he wants to be a sidekick, Marty picks doing puzzles as Max's and his "thing", and Larry watches Abby's Sunshine Scout Troop. Debbie wants to quit making purses when she gets overwhelmed. Jackie and Larry forces Abby and the Sunshine Scout girls to make the purses, not knowing that it is illegal, and Jill backs out of the deal. Marty later "solves the puzzle" and reveals in front of everybody that Jackie wants a job, Larry wants a daughter, and Amber likes Reggie. When Amber lies and tells Reggie that Marty was wrong, she convinces Reggie but Giselle sees through her lie and threatens Amber by saying she fights for what she likes. Max, Abby, and Marty invest in Debbie's purse making business and all suggest names: Bag Ladies (Max), Debbie's Purseycats (Abby), and "Pursenality" (Marty).
22	22	"It Has Begun..."	Chris Koch	Kirker Butler	March 27, 2013	5.52
The Weavers take the Bird-Kersees to Atlantic City where Marty is amazed to find out that Larry can see through cards, and Jackie expresses a desire for a human wedding. Meanwhile, back in Hidden Hills, Dick gets a call from his grandfather (George Takei), which could mean it's time for the Zabvronians to go home. In the end the Zabvronians don't go home, but Larry's father sends a warning message through the toaster. Unfortunately, the Weavers now have the toaster, and Marty bites into the toast, complains that it's stale, and throws it in the sink. The toast says "Warning", but the rest is unreadable due to Marty's bite and because the toast shattered when it hit the sink, but by Larry's father's dialog before sending the toast, it may be an invasion (Actually, the toast says 'Warning, Attack is Imminent'). Reggie Jackson also breaks up with his girlfriend when he feels that he is still in love with Amber. At the end of the episode they kiss and Amber says that it's going to be an interesting summer.

== U.S. ratings ==
#	Title	Air date	Rating/Share (18–49)	Viewers (millions)
1	"Pilot"	September 26, 2012	3.2/8	9.22
2	"Journey to the Center of the Mall"	October 3, 2012	1.9/5	6.32
3	"Things Just Got Real"	October 10, 2012	2.0/5	6.39
4	"Bathroom Etiquette"	October 17, 2012	1.9/6	6.53
5	"Halloween-ween"	October 24, 2012	2.0/6	6.96
6	"Larry Bird and the Iron Throne"	October 31, 2012	1.9/6	5.78
7	"50 Shades of Green"	November 7, 2012	2.1/6	6.87
8	"Thanksgiving Is for the Bird-Kersees"	November 14, 2012	1.9/5	6.82
9	"Merry Crap-Mas"	December 5, 2012	1.9/5	6.42
10	"Juan of the Dead"	December 12, 2012	1.6/4	5.40
11	"The Gingerbread Man"	January 9, 2013	2.1/6	6.65
12	"Cold War"	January 16, 2013	1.8/5	6.09
13	"Dream Weavers"	January 23, 2013	2.0/5	6.42
14	"The Back Nine"	January 30, 2013	1.6/4	5.27
15	"Space Invaders"	February 6, 2013	1.7/5	6.04
16	"Mother Clubbers"	February 13, 2013	1.7/5	5.89
17	"Larry Bird Presents an Oscar-Winning Film by Larry Bird"	February 20, 2013	1.9/5	6.34
18	"Camping"	February 27, 2013	1.7/5	6.01
19	"I Believe I Can Drive"	March 6, 2013	1.7/5	5.74
20	"Sing Like a Larry Bird"	March 13, 2013	1.4/4	4.72
21	"Mo Purses Mo Money Mo Problems"	March 20, 2013	1.4/4	4.76
22	"It Has Begun..."	March 27, 2013	1.5/5	5.52
