= List of The Neighbors characters =

Simon Templeman obtained the role of Larry Bird, the leader of the aliens.

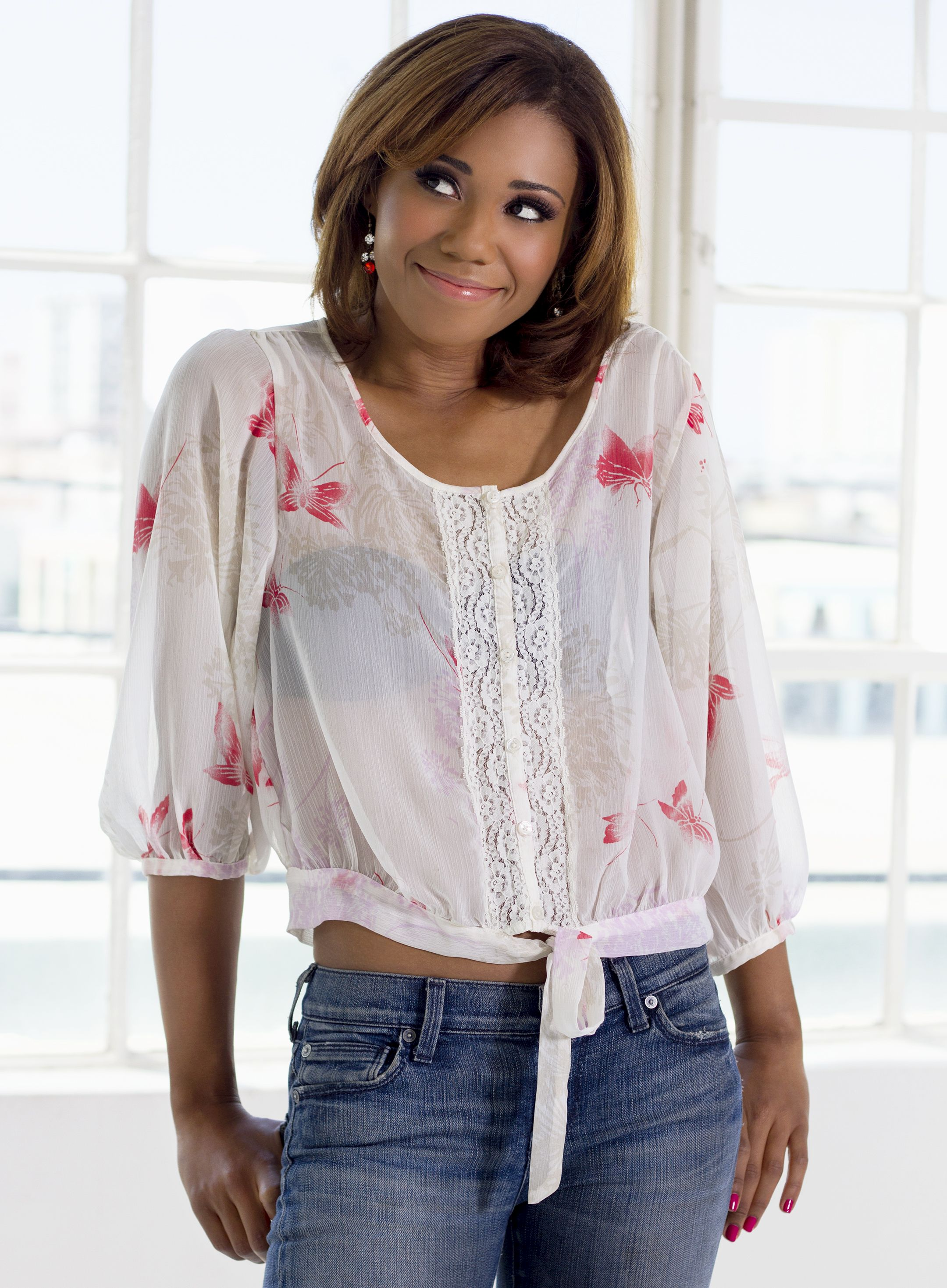
Toks Olagundoye as Jackie Joyner-Kersee, wife of Larry Bird.

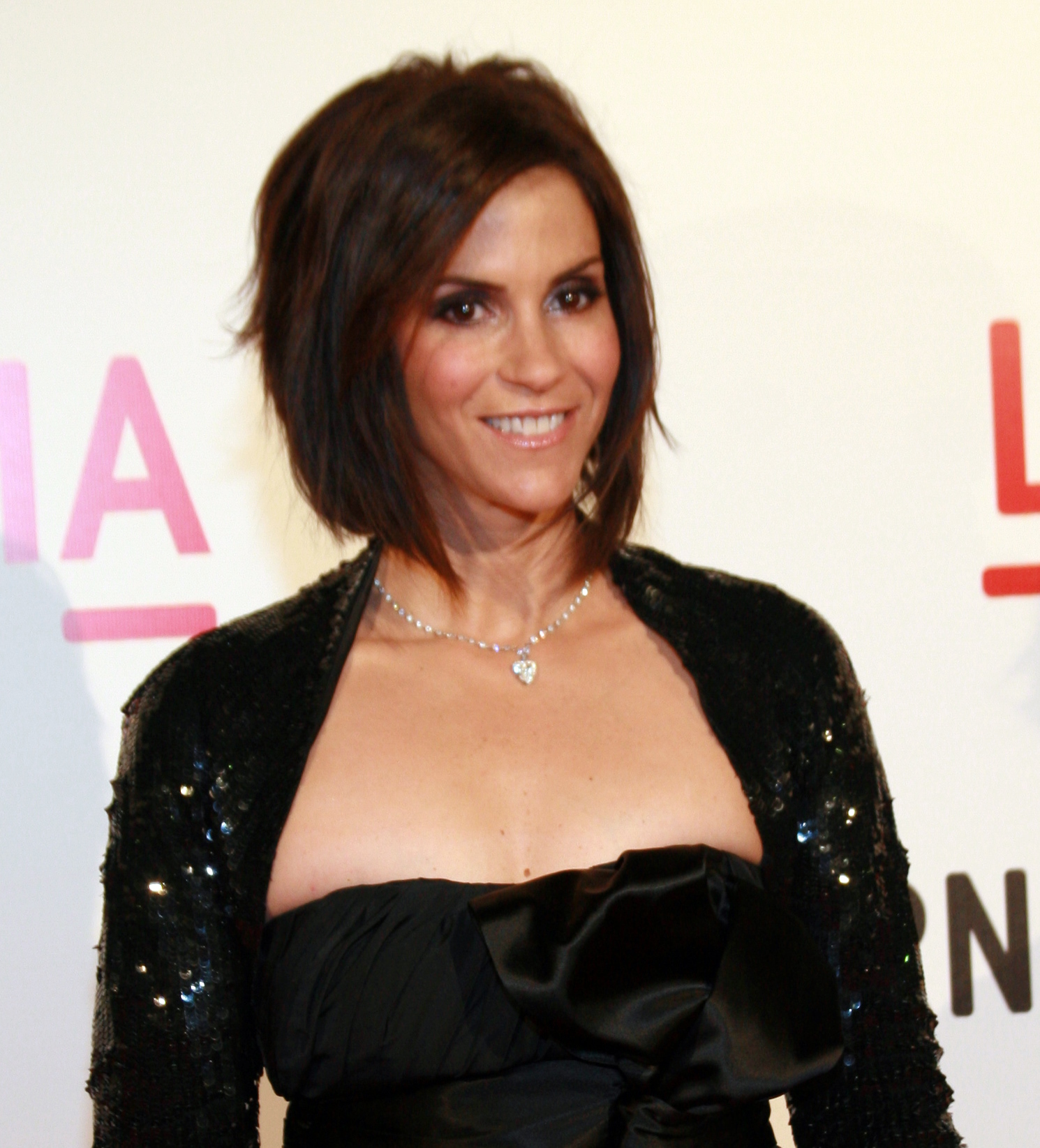
Jamie Gertz stars as Debbie Weaver, matriarch of the human family in the neighborhood.

The Neighbors is a sci-fi sitcom about a family of humans living in a suburban community of extraterrestrials in Bayonne, New Jersey. The main cast includes Jami Gertz, Lenny Venito, Simon Templeman, Toks Olagundoye, Clara Mamet, Tim Jo, Ian Patrick, Max Charles, and Isabella Crovetti.

== Main character appearance summary ==
Character	Portrayed by	Seasons	
Character	Portrayed by	1	2
Debby Weaver	Jami Gertz	Main	Main
Marty Weaver	Lenny Venito	Main	Main
Larry Bird	Simon Templeman	Main	Main
Jackie Joyner-Kersee	Toks Olagundoye	Main	Main
Amber Weaver	Clara Mamet	Main	Main
Reggie Jackson	Tim Jo	Main	Main
Dick Butkus	Ian Patrick	Main	Main
Max Weaver	Max Charles	Main	Main
Abby Weaver	Isabella Cramp	Main	Main
Dominic Weaver	Stacy Keach	Recurring	Recurring
Theresa Weaver	Debra Mooney	Guest	Guest
Jane	Megan Park	—N/a	Recurring
Father	George Takei	Recurring	Recurring

== Main characters ==
- Debby Weaver (portrayed by Jami Gertz) is the mother of the Weaver family. Despite first impressions, she learned to accept her alien neighbors. She married Marty many years ago after they met at their high school's prom.
- Marty Weaver (portrayed by Lenny Venito) is the father of the Weaver family. Marty learns to befriend the Bird-Joyner-Kersees, particularly Larry, despite his strong distrust for the family at first. He is known for being lazy and was in a rock band throughout high school.
- Amber Weaver (portrayed by Clara Mamet) is the oldest daughter of the Weaver family. She has a generally pessimistic, sarcastic attitude towards everything. For the majority of season 2, she dates Reggie Jackson, the first son of Larry and Jackie.
- Max Weaver (portrayed by Max Charles) is the middle child of the Weaver family. Though he is not very intelligent, he sometimes has unexpected good fortune fall in his favor, including qualifying for his school's spelling bee by spelling his last name.
- Abby Weaver (portrayed by Isabella Cramp) is the youngest child of the Weaver family. She is known for being sassy towards her brother. Abby is one of the few members of the family who is able to talk to Amber without fear.
- Larry Bird (portrayed by Simon Templeman) is the orderly but neurotic father of the Bird-Joyner-Kersee family and the leader of the alien community. He strongly attempts to fit in on Earth, often by learning about new holidays, television programs, or other cultural phenomena. His ultimate goal is to rise to some position of power such as one of the Sharks on Shark Tank. He takes his name from basketball star Larry Bird.
- Jackie Joyner-Kersee (portrayed by Toks Olagundoye) is the generally upbeat mother of the Bird-Joyner-Kersee family. She, like her husband, often attempts to fit in on Earth and frequently points out the differences between Earth and the aliens' home world of Zabvronia. She takes her name from Jackie Joyner-Kersee, an American Olympian track and field star.
- Reggie Jackson (portrayed by Tim Jo) is the well-meaning older son of the Bird-Joyner-Kersee family. Though he shows romantic interest in Amber, he breaks up with her midway through the second season due to his Zabvronian "soulmate," Jane. His name comes from Reggie Jackson, an American baseball player.
- Dick Beef Butkus (portrayed by Ian Patrick) is the younger son of the Bird-Joyner-Kersee family. He has unique and odd behavior and, at a certain point during the first season, experiences a strong love for a toaster. His name was taken from professional football player Dick Butkus.
