= The Neighbors season 2 =

The Neighbors
- Season 2
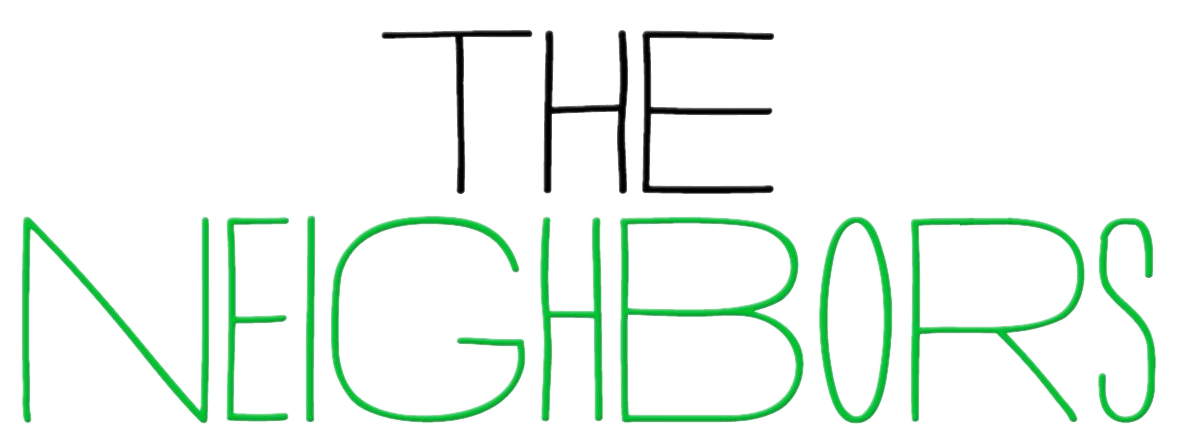
- The Neighbors
- No. of episodes: 22

Release
- Original network: ABC
- Original release: September 21, 2013 – April 12, 2014

Season chronology
- ← Previous; Season 1

The second and final season of the American television science fiction comedy series The Neighbors premiered on September 21, 2013, on ABC, after being renewed for a second season on May 11, 2013. The series was created by Dan Fogelman and produced by Fogelman, Chris Koch, Aaron Kaplan, John Hoberg, Kat Likkel, Kristin Newman, Kirker Butler, and Jeffrey Morton. The series follows the Weavers (Jami Gertz, Lenny Venito, Max Charles, Isabella Cramp, and Clara Mamet), a family of humans who relocate to a gated community, which happens to be inhabited by aliens, such as the Bird-Kersees (Simon Templeman, Toks Olagundoye, Ian Patrick, and Tim Jo).

== Cast ==
=== Main cast ===
- Jami Gertz as Debbie Weaver (22 episodes)
- Lenny Venito as Marty Weaver (22 episodes)
- Simon Templeman as Larry Bird (22 episodes)
- Toks Olagundoye as Jackie Joyner-Kersee (22 episodes)
- Max Charles as Max Weaver (18 episodes)
- Isabella Cramp as Abby Weaver (18 episodes)
- Clara Mamet as Amber Weaver (21 episodes)
- Ian Patrick as Dick Butkus (22 episodes)
- Tim Jo as Reggie Jackson (21 episodes)

=== Recurring cast ===
- Megan Park as Jane (9 episodes)
- Patrick O'Sullivan as Johnny Unitas (7 episodes)
- Katherine Tokarz as Mary Lou Retton (4 episodes)
- Alden Villaverde as Kareem Abdul-Jabbar (4 episodes)
- Reginald VelJohnson as Father Kersee (3 episodes)
- Ian Wolterstorff as Keef (2 episodes)
- Meredith Baxter as Mother Joyner (2 episodes)
- Kiersten Lyons as Billie Jean King (4 episodes)
- George Takei as Grandfather (3 episodes)
- Joshua Sasse as DJ Jazzy Jeff (3 episodes)
- Rosalind Chao as Dr. Barbara Hartley (2 episodes)
- Debra Mooney as Theresa Weaver (1 episode)
- Stacy Keach as Dominick Weaver (1 episode)

=== Guest stars ===
- Jerry Springer as himself ("Family Conference")
- Lucy Davis as Helen ("The Neighbours")
- Wendy Williams as Shirley ("The One With Interspecies F-R-I-E-N-D-S")
- Barbara Corcoran as herself ("We Jumped the Shark (Tank)")
- Mark Cuban as himself ("We Jumped the Shark (Tank)")
- Robert Herjavec as himself ("We Jumped the Shark (Tank)")
- Daymond John as himself ("We Jumped the Shark (Tank)")
- Kevin O'Leary as himself ("We Jumped the Shark (Tank)")
- Lori Loughlin as Tina Giannulli ("High School Reunion")
- Mark McGrath as John ("High School Reunion")
- Mia Cottet as Collette ("High School Reunion")
- Matthew Del Negro as Rob ("High School Reunion")
- Carrot Top as himself ("Oscar Party")
- Erik Estrada as himself ("Oscar Party")
- Mary Birdsong as Justine ("Oscar Party")
- Rachel Dratch as Pearl ("A Night in (Lou Ferrigno's Hibachi) Heaven")
- Rhea Perlman as Janet ("Uncle Benjamin")
- Bill Nye as himself ("Close Encounters of the Bird Kind")
- Lawrence O'Donnell as himself ("Close Encounters of the Bird Kind")
- Joel Stein as himself ("Close Encounters of the Bird Kind")
- Candace Cameron Bure as Woman ("There Goes the Neighbors' Hood")
- Scott Weinger as Man ("There Goes the Neighbors' Hood")

== Episodes ==
No. overall	No. in season	Title	Directed by	Written by	Original release date	US viewers (millions)
23	1	"Family Conference"	Chris Koch	Kristin Newman	September 20, 2013	4.58
As the summer winds down, the Weavers and the Bird-Kersees discover that Amber and Reggie have begun dating. Jackie calls for a family conference - in a newly revealed basement at the Bird-Kersee home - at which both families vote on whether or not the couple can stay together. Things approach fever pitch until Abby interrupts with a heartfelt speech about how Reggie is the only person to ever make Amber smile. Then, just as the families are about to embrace the relationship, an unexpected guest arrives to compete for Reggie's affections: his Zabvronian 'soulmate' now named Jane. Guest star Jerry Springer.
24	2	"September Fools"	Chris Koch	Kirker Butler	September 27, 2013	4.06
The Weavers explain to Larry what April Fool's Day is, and after making fun of Larry's capability to prank someone he begins to meticulously plans a major prank. The Weavers are about to take a family photo, but Dick accidentally ages the kids. Reggie tries to convince his Zabvronian 'soulmate' Jane that they are not meant to be with each other and decides to dump her off at a bus station.
25	3	"The Neighbours"	John Fortenberry	Isaac Aptaker & Elizabeth Berger	October 4, 2013	4.14
Jackie attempts to impress her new boss by inviting her over for a traditional English dinner. Meanwhile, Larry recklessly shops, Debbie tries to determine a dream job and Marty overcompensates after suffering erectile dysfunction.
26	4	"The One With Interspecies F-R-I-E-N-D-S"	Lev Spiro	Scott King	October 11, 2013	4.12
Debbie decides to learn more about Jackie. Meanwhile, Dick tries to help Marty get a handle on his junk-food binging and Reggie and Amber watch an Animal Planet documentary on inter-species relationships.
27	5	"Challoweenukah"	Chris Koch	Isaac Aptaker & Elizabeth Berger	October 18, 2013	4.27
Larry tries to combine Halloween and Chanukah to create a new super-holiday. Meanwhile, an obnoxious couple challenges Marty and Debbie to a family Halloween costume contest. After Reggie decided to spend Halloween with his family, Amber stops speaking with him. As Reggie tries to figure out what he did, Jackie is conflicted with telling him or pretending to be ignorant so she can spend the holiday with her son.
28	6	"Any Friggin' Sunday"	Joe Pennella	Jeremy Hall	November 1, 2013	4.50
Larry decides golf is boring so he takes an interest in football. Meanwhile, Debbie and Jackie orchestrate a romantic evening for Reggie and Amber.
29	7	"We Jumped the Shark (Tank)"	Jeffrey Walker	Scott King	November 8, 2013	4.52
When Debbie creates a unique purse, Jackie gets them booked on Shark Tank. Amber choreographs Abby's dance for a big recital.
30	8	"Good Debbie Hunting"	Josh Greenbaum	Kristi Korzec	November 15, 2013	3.95
Debbie wants to enroll in business school but first must pass a qualifying exam. Reggie and Amber's relationship is tested when Jane comes back from New York and offers Reggie popularity at high school if Reggie starts dating her.
31	9	"Thanksgiving is No Schmuck Bait"	John Fortenberry	Kristin Newman & Scott Weinger	November 22, 2013	3.93
The Weaver Thanksgiving doesn't go as planned when Marty's father (Stacy Keach) arrives, with luggage in tow, to announce that, after fifty years of marriage, he and Marty's mother (Debra Mooney) are getting divorced and he's moving in. Jackie's Zabvronian parents (Reginald VelJohnson, Meredith Baxter) arrive to witness the news and learn about human relationships. Reggie is shocked when he sees how okay Amber is with her grandparents divorcing and how okay she is with long term relationships ending.
32	10	"Supreme Like Me"	Jann Turner	Isaac Aptaker & Elizabeth Berger	December 6, 2013	4.19
Jackie's parents help the Weavers with a burst water pipe, frustrating Jackie as to how well they get along. Larry searches for a job to prove he can support a family. Reggie is jealous of all of Amber's interesting past memories and tries to create new ones.
33	11	"A Christmas Story"	Chris Koch	Kirker Butler	December 13, 2013	4.04
Debbie accidentally spoils the Christmas surprise Larry had for Dick. Reggie and Amber try to find the perfect gift for each other to show their true feelings.
34	12	"Fear and Loving in New Jersey"	Lev L. Spiro	Brian Donovan & Ed Herro	January 10, 2014	4.81
Earth appears more dangerous when the Bird-Kersees are mugged. The Weavers teach them how to protect themselves, leading Larry to build a panic room in Debbie and Marty's bedroom. Meanwhile, Jane crashes Amber and Reggie's date.
35	13	"High School Reunion"	Rebecca Asher	Scott Weinger	January 17, 2014	3.71
Marty and Debbie's 25th high-school reunion draws near. Marty wishes to reunite his heavy-metal band for a performance at the event, and Debbie seeks out her archenemy.
36	14	"Man, Actually"	Jeffrey Walker	Michael Feldman & Debbie Jhoon	January 24, 2014	3.79
Reggie and Larry's Zabvronian male cycles are synchronized, when both experience relationship issues. Debbie goes back to business school and must enlist Marty's help to curtail a flirty professor.
37	15	"You've Lost That Larry Feeling"	Chris Koch	Jeremy Hall	January 31, 2014	4.28
Debbie invites her college study group to her house, but appears more like a mother to them than a schoolmate. Larry visits Jackie at work and experiences jealousy for the first time over her co-worker, Keith. Amber and Reggie finalize their split, but only with outside help.
38	16	"Oscar Party"	Bryan Gordon	Michael Feldman & Debbie Jhoon	February 28, 2014	4.25
Debbie throws a fancy Oscar party for her friends from Bayonne. The Bird-Kersees invite Erik Estrada and Carrot Top, much to the Weavers' chagrin. Meanwhile, Max tries out for hockey, and Amber has to drive him there. She overhears the hockey dads' chauvinism and convinces Abby to also try out, only Max learns Abby plays better than he does.
39	17	"Balle Balle!"	John Fortenberry	Scott Weinger	March 7, 2014	3.60
Larry gets invited to his Indian co-worker's traditional wedding. Larry and Jackie's research for the perfect gift results in their doing a full-scale "Bollywood" performance. Meanwhile, Marty and Debbie plan a family picnic, but their kids think the idea is boring, and the parents find it difficult to prove them wrong.
40	18	"A Night in (Lou Ferrigno's Hibachi) Heaven"	John Fortenberry	Kristi Korzec	March 14, 2014	3.45
The Weavers admit to being in a rut to the Bird-Kersees, who have never heard of such a thing and later think it is contagious. The four of them have trouble improving their respective situations. Meanwhile, Dick has to stay at the Weavers' house with Max and Abby. He falls in love with their middle-aged babysitter (Rachel Dratch) with a sinus infection and hygiene issues.
41	19	"Uncle Benjamin"	Chris Koch	Isaac Aptaker & Elizabeth Berger	March 21, 2014	3.67
Debbie's estranged wild child mother, Janet (Rhea Perlman), invites the Weavers to her San Diego timeshare to meet her recently adopted son, who is 10. Debbie agrees, but only if Larry & Jackie also make the trip. They accept, which makes for an interesting plane ride. Meanwhile, Marty tries to help Abby with her fear of the ocean. Reggie and Amber try to out do each other with how good their new relationships are.
42	20	"Close Encounters of the Bird Kind"	Lev Spiro	Brian Donovan & Ed Herro	March 28, 2014	4.17
Jackie feels neglected and sees a therapist, when Larry spends their anniversary obsessed with proving himself to his father. Debbie and Marty's bowling team is in the semi-finals, but Debbie's skills are hampering the team. Marty is tasked with removing her from the team for the finals. Meanwhile, Max and Abby's behavior causes Dick to consult Joel Stein, Lawrence O'Donnell and Bill Nye (as themselves) for advice.
43	21	"All That Jazzy Jeff"	Joe Penella	Dan Fogelman	April 4, 2014	3.87
Larry's brother DJ Jazzy Jeff arrives to keep tabs on Larry per their father's orders. Jackie really wants another child. Amber talks to Debbie about her college boyfriend. Reggie confides his uncle that he is still in love with Amber. Jeff manipulates everyone in order to bring the entire community back to Zabvron.
44	22	"There Goes the Neighbors' Hood"	John Fortenberry	Dan Fogelman & Steven White	April 11, 2014	4.06
The Zabvronians are leaving. Larry's pregnant, and no Zabvronian has ever given birth in human form, nor on a crazy planet such as Earth. Debbie convinces him to stay, but the rest of the Zabvronians adore DJ Jazzy Jeff, who wants everyone to go home. Also, Reggie is still threatening to become human.

== U.S. ratings ==
No.	Title	Air date	Rating/Share (18–49)	Viewers (million)
1	"Family Conference"	September 20, 2013	1.2/4	4.58
2	"September Fools"	September 27, 2013	1.0/4	4.06
3	"The Neighbours"	October 4, 2013	1.0/4	4.14
4	"The One With Interspecies F-R-I-E-N-D-S"	October 11, 2013	0.9/3	4.12
5	"Challoweenukah"	October 18, 2013	1.0/4	4.27
6	"Any Friggin' Sunday"	November 1, 2013	1.0/4	4.50
7	"We Jumped the Shark (Tank)"	November 8, 2013	1.0/4	4.52
8	"Good Debbie Hunting"	November 15, 2013	0.8/3	3.95
9	"Thanksgiving is No Schmuck Bait"	November 22, 2013	0.9/3	3.93
10	"Supreme Like Me"	December 6, 2013	0.9/3	4.19
11	"A Christmas Story"	December 13, 2013	0.9/3	4.04
12	"Fear and Loving in New Jersey"	January 10, 2014	1.1/4	4.81
13	"High School Reunion"	January 17, 2014	0.9/3	3.71
14	"Man, Actually"	January 24, 2014	0.8/3	3.79
15	"You've Lost That Larry Feeling"	January 31, 2014	1.1/4	4.28
16	"Oscar Party"	February 28, 2014	1.0/4	4.25
17	"Balle Balle!"	March 7, 2014	0.9/3	3.60
18	"A Night in (Lou Ferrigno's Hibachi) Heaven"	March 14, 2014	0.8/3	3.45
19	"Uncle Benjamin"	March 21, 2014	0.9/3	3.67
20	"Close Encounters of the Bird Kind"	March 28, 2014	1.1/4	4.17
21	"All That Jazzy Jeff"	April 4, 2014	0.9/3	3.87
22	"There Goes the Neighbors' Hood"	April 11, 2014	0.9/3	4.06
