= List of The Neighbors episodes =

The Neighbors is an American science fiction comedy series that premiered on September 26, 2012, on ABC. The series was created by Dan Fogelman, and follows a family of humans who relocate to a gated community, which happens to be inhabited by aliens.

44 episodes of The Neighbors aired over the series' two seasons.

== Series overview ==
Season	Episodes	Originally released	
Season	Episodes	First released	Last released
1	22	September 26, 2012	March 27, 2013
2	22	September 20, 2013	April 11, 2014

== Episodes ==
=== Season 1 (2012–13) ===
No. overall	No. in season	Title	Directed by	Written by	Original release date	US viewers (millions)
1	1	"Meet the Neighbors" "Pilot"	Chris Koch	Dan Fogelman	September 26, 2012	9.22
2	2	"Journey to the Center of the Mall"	Chris Koch	Dan Fogelman	October 3, 2012	6.32
3	3	"Things Just Got Real"	Luke Greenfield	Story by : Dan Fogelman; Teleplay by : Isaac Aptaker & Elizabeth Berger	October 10, 2012	6.39
4	4	"Bathroom Etiquette"	Chris Koch	Dan Fogelman	October 17, 2012	6.53
5	5	"Halloween-ween"	Chris Koch	Dan Fogelman	October 24, 2012	6.96
6	6	"Larry Bird and the Iron Throne"	Peter Lauer	Dan Fogelman	October 31, 2012	5.78
7	7	"50 Shades of Green"	John Fortenberry	Kristin Newman	November 7, 2012	6.87
8	8	"Thanksgiving Is for the Bird-Kersees"	Chris Koch	Scott King	November 14, 2012	6.82
9	9	"Merry Crap-Mas"	Luke Greenfield	Tracy Oliver	December 5, 2012	6.42
10	10	"Juan of the Dead"	Lev L. Spiro	Kat Likkel & John Hoberg	December 12, 2012	5.40
11	11	"The Gingerbread Man"	Chris Koch	Kirker Butler	January 9, 2013	6.65
12	12	"Cold War"	Henry Chan	Isaac Aptaker & Elizabeth Berger	January 16, 2013	6.09
13	13	"Dream Weavers"	Bryan Gordon	Kristin Newman	January 23, 2013	6.42
14	14	"The Back Nine"	Chris Koch	Kat Likkel & John Hoberg	January 30, 2013	5.27
15	15	"Space Invaders"	Joe Pennella	Jeremy Hall	February 6, 2013	6.04
16	16	"Mother Clubbers"	John Fortenberry	Scott King	February 13, 2013	5.89
17	17	"Larry Bird Presents an Oscar-Winning Film by Larry Bird"	Lev L. Spiro	Isaac Aptaker & Elizabeth Berger	February 20, 2013	6.34
18	18	"Camping"	Chris Koch	Kristin Newman	February 27, 2013	6.01
19	19	"I Believe I Can Drive"	Chris Koch	Isaac Aptaker & Elizabeth Berger	March 6, 2013	5.74
20	20	"Sing Like a Larry Bird"	John Fortenberry	Tracy Oliver	March 13, 2013	4.72
21	21	"Mo Purses Mo Money Mo Problems"	Jeffrey Walker	Scott King	March 20, 2013	4.76
22	22	"It Has Begun..."	Chris Koch	Kirker Butler	March 27, 2013	5.52

=== Season 2 (2013–14) ===
No. overall	No. in season	Title	Directed by	Written by	Original release date	US viewers (millions)
23	1	"Family Conference"	Chris Koch	Kristin Newman	September 20, 2013	4.58
24	2	"September Fools"	Chris Koch	Kirker Butler	September 27, 2013	4.06
25	3	"The Neighbours"	John Fortenberry	Isaac Aptaker & Elizabeth Berger	October 4, 2013	4.14
26	4	"The One With Interspecies F-R-I-E-N-D-S"	Lev Spiro	Scott King	October 11, 2013	4.12
27	5	"Challoweenukah"	Chris Koch	Isaac Aptaker & Elizabeth Berger	October 18, 2013	4.27
28	6	"Any Friggin' Sunday"	Joe Pennella	Jeremy Hall	November 1, 2013	4.50
29	7	"We Jumped the Shark (Tank)"	Jeffrey Walker	Scott King	November 8, 2013	4.52
30	8	"Good Debbie Hunting"	Josh Greenbaum	Kristi Korzec	November 15, 2013	3.95
31	9	"Thanksgiving is No Schmuck Bait"	John Fortenberry	Kristin Newman & Scott Weinger	November 22, 2013	3.93
32	10	"Supreme Like Me"	Jann Turner	Isaac Aptaker & Elizabeth Berger	December 6, 2013	4.19
33	11	"A Christmas Story"	Chris Koch	Kirker Butler	December 13, 2013	4.04
34	12	"Fear and Loving in New Jersey"	Lev L. Spiro	Brian Donovan & Ed Herro	January 10, 2014	4.81
35	13	"High School Reunion"	Rebecca Asher	Scott Weinger	January 17, 2014	3.71
36	14	"Man, Actually"	Jeffrey Walker	Michael Feldman & Debbie Jhoon	January 24, 2014	3.79
37	15	"You've Lost That Larry Feeling"	Chris Koch	Jeremy Hall	January 31, 2014	4.28
38	16	"Oscar Party"	Bryan Gordon	Michael Feldman & Debbie Jhoon	February 28, 2014	4.25
39	17	"Balle Balle!"	John Fortenberry	Scott Weinger	March 7, 2014	3.60
40	18	"A Night in (Lou Ferrigno's Hibachi) Heaven"	John Fortenberry	Kristi Korzec	March 14, 2014	3.45
41	19	"Uncle Benjamin"	Chris Koch	Isaac Aptaker & Elizabeth Berger	March 21, 2014	3.67
42	20	"Close Encounters of the Bird Kind"	Lev Spiro	Brian Donovan & Ed Herro	March 28, 2014	4.17
43	21	"All That Jazzy Jeff"	Joe Penella	Dan Fogelman	April 4, 2014	3.87
44	22	"There Goes the Neighbors' Hood"	John Fortenberry	Dan Fogelman & Steven White	April 11, 2014	4.06
