= Meet the Neighbors =

- The Neighbors episode
- Episode no.: Season 1 Episode 1
- Directed by: Chris Koch
- Written by: Dan Fogelman
- Original air date: September 26, 2012
- Running time: 22 minutes

"Meet the Neighbors" or "Pilot" is the pilot episode of the American television science fiction sitcom The Neighbors. It was slated to air on the American Broadcasting Company (ABC) on September 26, 2012. The episode was written by Dan Fogelman, and directed by Chris Koch. The episode generally received negative reviews.

The concept of The Neighbors was devised by Fogelman, who previously wrote the films Cars, Cars 2 and Tangled. Although it is a comedy series, its script was cited as potentially being too complex for mainstream American television. Fogelman conceived The Neighbors after a visit to the gated community where his mother lived.

== Production ==
=== Conception ===
Dan Fogelman devised the concept of the series, which was previously entitled Down to Earth. It was described as a sitcom about "a New Jersey family that moves into a gated community occupied exclusively by extraterrestrials." Fogelman previously wrote the films Cars, Cars 2 and Tangled. The American Broadcasting Company (ABC) picked up the pilot episode of The Neighbors in October 2011, with a pilot commitment. Chris Koch signed on to direct the pilot episode. The show was originally produced for ABC Studios and Warner Bros. Television, but Warner Bros. Television was replaced by company Kaplan Entertainment. Dan Fogelman, Chris Koch, Jeff Morton and Aaron Kaplan executive produced the episode. In May 2012, the show renamed to The Neighbors, and production of the program was green-lit. "Pilot" was written by Fogelman.

Fogelman conceived The Neighbors after visiting his mother, who lived in a gated townhouse community, and stated, "you could reach out of my mom's bathroom window and touch her neighbor's bathroom window", but they never spoke to or knew each other, and the idea was "who are these people that she's living between?", and what if they were all aliens? He claimed that family is the best part of humanity, and he kept "exploring stuff". Fogelman wants The Neighbors to be a show that "the whole family can watch together". He said: "It's high concept but I do want to ground it as a family sitcom".

The show's premise has been described as "goofy", and has been considered as a "high-concept" show by Entertainment Weekly. At the semi-annual press tour in Beverly Hills, ABC Entertainment President Paul Lee stated that The Neighbors has "high-concept nature", but "love[d]" it. The Neighbors was originally stated to premiere at 9:30 p.m. on Wednesday, but ABC decided to air it in 8:30 time interval. In response to this, Lee claimed that "8:30 p.m. suited the show better" as "there's so much pressure [to perform] after Modern Family". The 9:30 p.m. slot was replaced with Suburgatory. Lee wants it to be on the air for a long time, and claimed that Suburgatory would better fit in the 9:30 slot. Lee praised Fogelman, calling him a "wondering writer"; he thinks he will give a "smart piece of storytelling".

=== Casting ===
Simon Templeman obtained the role of Wilt Chamberlain, the leader of the aliens.

In December 2011, Jami Gertz, Simon Templeman, Toks Olagundoye and Tim Jo obtained roles in the series. It was announced that Gertz would play Debbie Weaver, the matriarch of the human family, Templeman would play Wilt Chamberlain, the leader of the aliens, Olagundoye was cast as Jackie Joyner Kersee, the matriarch of the lead alien family, and Jo would appear as Joe Montana, the son of the alien family. Wilt Chamberlain was originally the lead alien Larry Bird.

In January 2012, Clara Mamet, Ian Patrick and Isabella Cramp garnered roles in the series. Mamet garnered the role of Gertz's teenage daughter, while Patrick and Cramp got kid roles. Later that month, Lenny Venito obtained the lead role as Marty Weaver, the father of the human family.

== Broadcast and reception ==
=== Ratings ===
"Pilot" is scheduled to air on ABC on September 26, 2012, after Modern Family. In Canada, it will air on Saturday at 10:00 p.m. on CTV network in the fall of 2012 after the Crimetime Saturday block.

=== Critical response ===
The Neighbors received negative treatment at the upfront for the program. Writing for the San Francisco Chronicle, David Wiegand thought that The Neighbors did not look "promising" as it has a high-concept show. Weigand compared it to the National Broadcasting Company (NBC) science fiction comedy series 3rd Rock from the Sun, claiming that the series' creator made it so different from Third Rock From the Sun, that it is "weird". He stated that if The Neighbors garnered low ratings, it could possibly be replaced with Family Tools, an ABC comedy that is scheduled to air in mid-season. He compared it to other comedies set to air on the same channel writing that those are better than The Neighbors. According to Weigand, The Neighbors seems like Outsourced, which aired for one season on NBC.

Other reviews were more positive. Dave Walker from The Times-Picayune thought that The Neighbors was a "fish-out-of-water"; he called it a "potentially comedic" show. Rob Owen, a Pittsburgh Post-Gazette critic, claimed that he has "interest in high-concept shows"; he also "laughed a good bit at the pilot episode". His concern was "how long they can keep up the jokes. Seeing the unusual way aliens do the dishes in the pilot is hilarious. But that gag only works the first time. After that, it's stale."
