= List of Kate Micucci performances =

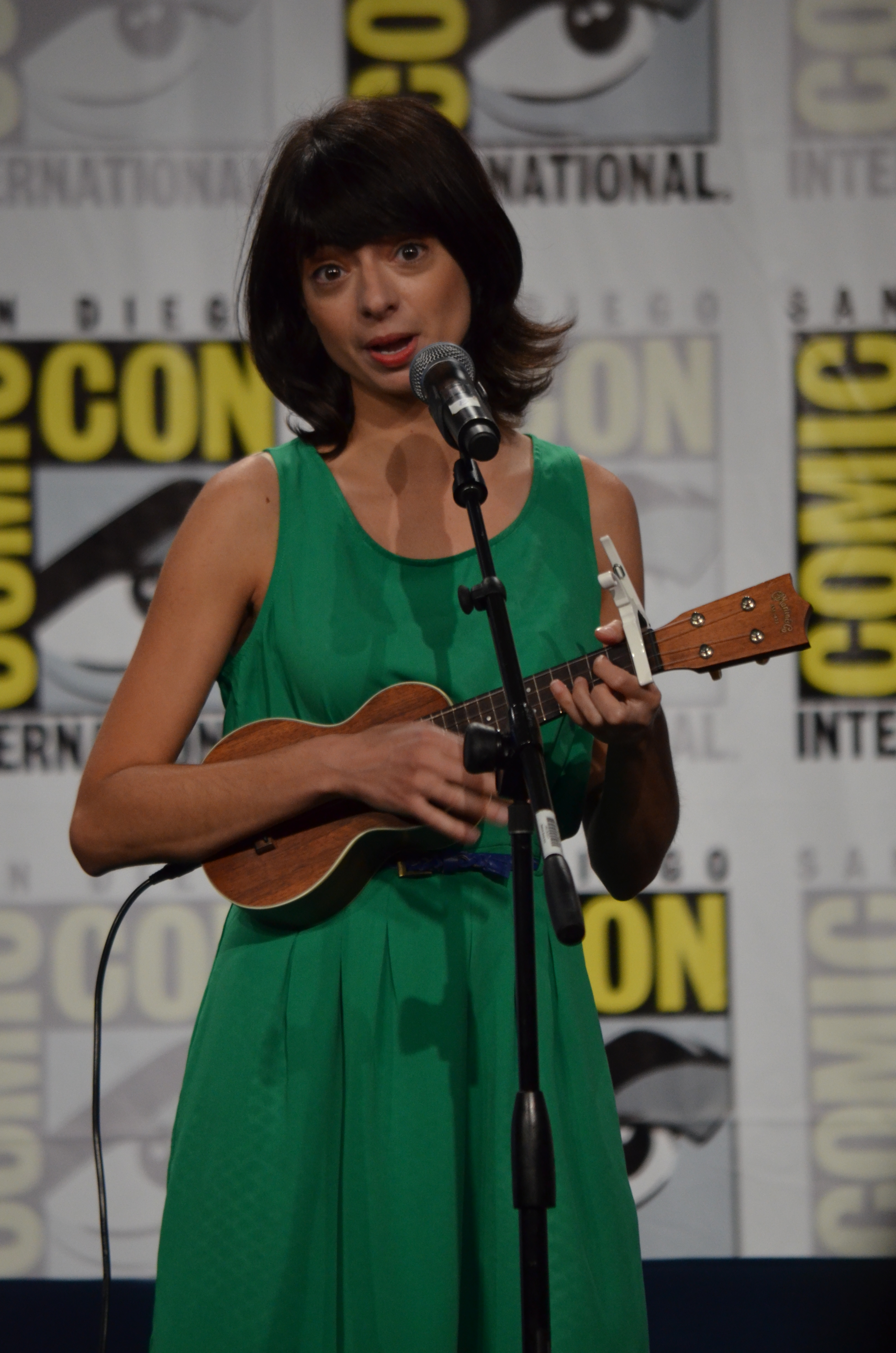
Micucci performing at the 2012 San Diego Comic-Con.

Kate Micucci is an American actress and voice actress. In live action, she has appeared in the recurring role of Shelley in the Fox sitcom Raising Hope, and as Lucy in CBS's The Big Bang Theory. In voice acting, she is known for her roles in Steven Universe, DuckTales, Milo Murphy's Law, and as Velma Dinkley in the Scooby-Doo franchise beginning with 2015's Be Cool, Scooby-Doo!

== Live action ==
=== Film ===
List of acting performances in films
Year	Title	Role	Notes
2007	Beat the Street	Roxy	Short film
2008	Bart Got a Room	Abby	
2008	Finding Amanda	Thin girl	Uncredited role
2008	Husband for Hire	Bubble	
2009	Imaginary Larry	Kate	Short film
2009	The Last Hurrah	Susan	
2010	Lee Mathers	Chelsea	
2010	When in Rome	Stacy	
2011	Smothered	Susie	
2012	Decoding Annie Parker	Rachel	
2014	Electric Slide	Sue Fellucci	
2014	Rudderless	Peaches	
2014	Search Party	Wedding singer duo	
2016	Don't Think Twice	Allison	
2016	Unleashed	Emma	
2017	The Little Hours	Sister Genevra	
2017	Sandy Wexler	Nurse Trisha	
2018	Seven Stages to Achieve Eternal Bliss	Claire	
2019	Jay and Silent Bob Reboot	Mooby's Clerk	
2019	The Last Laugh	Jeannie	
2020	I Used to Go Here	Rachel	
2021	Flora & Ulysses	Rita	
2022	Clerks III	Mary	
2024	The 4:30 Movie	Melody's mom	

=== Television ===
List of acting performances in television
Year	Title	Role	Notes
2006	Four Kings	Toni	8 episodes
2006	How I Met Your Mother	Registrar	Episode: "Atlantic City"
2006	Malcolm in the Middle	Heather	Episode: "Morp"
2007	Campus Ladies	Less attractive girl	Episode: "Foreign Policy"
2008	Cory in the House	Becky	2 episodes
2009	Destined to Fail	Lisa	Pilot
2009	Elevator	Lily	2 episodes
2009	Rules of Engagement	Tanya	Episode: "Poaching Timmy"
2009	Scrubs	Stephanie Gooch	5 episodes
2010	Bored to Death	Sherri	2 episodes
2010	Laugh Track Mash-Ups	Annie Gibbler	Episode: "Ralphie n' Me"
2010	'Til Death	Ally	12 episodes
2010	Weeds	Waitress	Episode: "A Shoe for a Shoe"
2010–2014	Raising Hope	Shelley	26 episodes
2011	Suburgatory	Cindy	Episode: "Charity Case"
2012	Easy to Assemble	Yolanda	3 episodes
2012	Psych	Penny Chalmers	Episode: "Autopsy Turvy"
2013	Key & Peele	Scout	Episode: "Mr. T PSA"
2013, 2017	The Big Bang Theory	Lucy	8 episodes
2014	Garfunkel and Oates	Kate	8 episodes; also co-creator, writer and executive producer
2015	The Comedians	Kate Micucci	Episode: "Overhear"
2015	Kroll Show	Stephanie	Episode: "Lizards vs. Penguins"
2015–2018	Another Period	Eunice	5 episodes
2016	Ask the StoryBots	Nitrogen Molecule	Episode: "Why Is the Sky Blue?"
2016–2019	Easy	Annie	3 episodes
2017	The Guest Book	Gillian	Episode: "Story Six"
2017	Will & Grace	Page	Episode: "11 Years Later"
2019	Mom	Patty	2 episodes
2019	Supergirl	Tour Guide	Episode: "Event Horizon"
2022	Guillermo del Toro's Cabinet of Curiosities	Stacey	Episode: "The Outside"
2024	Night Court	Carol Ann Wheeler	Recurring
2026	Crystal Lake	Miss Parsons	Episode: "Friday..."

== Voice roles ==
=== Film ===
List of voice performances in feature and direct-to-video films
Year	Title	Role	Notes
2014	Planes: Fire & Rescue	Additional voices	
2014	Rio 2	Tiny	
2014	Elf: Buddy's Musical Christmas	Jovie	
2015	The SpongeBob Movie: Sponge Out of Water	Popsicle	
2016	Bad Cat	Taco / Misscat	2018 English dub
2016	Garfunkel and Oates: Trying to Be Special	as herself	
2016	Nerdland	Sally	
2016	Lego Scooby-Doo! Haunted Hollywood	Velma Dinkley	
2016	Scooby-Doo! and WWE: Curse of the Speed Demon	Velma Dinkley	
2017	The Lego Batman Movie	Clayface	
2017	Lego Scooby-Doo! Blowout Beach Bash	Velma Dinkley	
2017	Scooby-Doo! Shaggy's Showdown	Velma Dinkley	
2018	Lego DC Comics Super Heroes: The Flash	Zatanna	
2018	Scooby-Doo! & Batman: The Brave and the Bold	Velma Dinkley	
2018	Scooby-Doo! and the Gourmet Ghost	Velma Dinkley	
2018	Show Dogs	Pigeon #2	
2019	Scooby-Doo! and the Curse of the 13th Ghost	Velma Dinkley	
2019	Scooby-Doo! Return to Zombie Island	Velma Dinkley	
2019	Steven Universe: The Movie	Sadie Miller	
2020	Happy Halloween, Scooby-Doo!	Velma Dinkley	
2021	Scooby-Doo! The Sword and the Scoob	Velma Dinkley / Sandi	
2021	Straight Outta Nowhere: Scooby-Doo! Meets Courage the Cowardly Dog	Velma Dinkley, Velma's Tablet	
2021	Seal Team	Diving Dee	
2022	Naked Mole Rat Gets Dressed: The Underground Rock Experience	Tall	
2022	Trick or Treat Scooby-Doo!	Velma Dinkley	
2023	Scooby-Doo! and Krypto, Too!	Velma Dinkley	
2025	Dog Man	Dippy	

=== TV Animation ===
List of voice performances in animation
Year	Title	Role	Notes
2011, 2015	Adventure Time	Wendy, Chips, Bunny Mom	2 episodes
2012–2013	Motorcity	Julie Kane, various voices	Main role
2013	Out There	Jay Stevens	
2013, 2019, 2023	Teen Titans Go!	Parry / Velma Dinkley	3 episodes
2013–2019	Steven Universe	Sadie Miller	Recurring role
2014–2017	Teenage Mutant Ninja Turtles	Irma, Rook	Recurring; 8 episodes
2014	Ben 10: Omniverse	Luhley	2 episodes
2014	Elf: Buddy's Musical Christmas	Jovie	Television film
2014	The 7D	Ghost girl	Episode: "Buckets/Frankengloom"
2014	TripTank	Caller in Purple Helmet	Episode: "Precipice of Yesterday"
2014	Wallykazam!	Elfelfa	Episode: "Wally Saves the Trollidays"
2015	Penn Zero: Part-Time Hero	Cuteling General	Episode: "The Ripple Effect"
2015	Scooby-Doo! Lego Shorts	Velma Dinkley	Main cast
2015	Turbo FAST	Tiffany	Episode: "Smoove as Ice"
2015–2016	Disney Star Darlings	Cassie	
2015–2018	Be Cool, Scooby-Doo!	Velma Dinkley	Main cast
2015–2025	Nature Cat	Daisy	Main cast
2016	Regular Show	Roxy	Episode: "Fries Night"
2016, 2018	The Powerpuff Girls	Hope / Octi	2 episodes
2016–2018	Mighty Magiswords	Penny Plasm, Bimm, additional voices	
2016–2019	Milo Murphy's Law	Sara, additional voices	Recurring role
2017	Mickey and the Roadster Racers	Emmy Lou	3 episodes
2017	Sofia the First	Galial	2 episodes
2017–2021	DuckTales	Webby Vanderquack, additional voices	Main cast
2017–2020	Unikitty!	Dr. Fox	Main cast
2018	Spy Kids: Mission Critical	Therese	10 episodes
2018	Supernatural	Velma Dinkley	Episode: "Scoobynatural"
2018	Little Big Awesome	Geremy / Candy Bar / Hair Lady	5 episodes
2019	Random Acts	Velma Dinkley	Episode: "Operation Exodus"
2019	Scooby-Doo and Guess Who?	Velma Dinkley, herself, additional voices	Main cast
2019	Elena of Avalor	Young Hool	Episode: "To Save a Sunbird"
2019	Steven Universe Future	Sadie Miller	Episode: "Little Graduation"
2020	Archibald's Next Big Thing	Jojo	Episode: "Power Play"
2020	Summer Camp Island	Accordion	Episode: "Lucy's Instrument"
2020–2021	Close Enough	Skye / Gifty	2 episodes
2021-2025	Bob's Burgers	Kid / Maggie	2 episodes
2021	Inside Job	Charlie	Episode: "The Brettfast Club"
2021–2022	American Dad!	Various voices	2 episodes
2021–2022	Amphibia	Terri	3 episodes
2022	Mickey Mouse Funhouse	Cora the Giant Crab	Recurring role
2023	Monster High	Meowlody	Episode: "Earworm"
2023, 2025	Hamster & Gretel	Kelly	2 episodes
2024	Jellystone!	Velma Dinkley	Episode: "Frankenhooky"
2024	Angry Birds Mystery Island	Mia	Main cast
2025	Rick and Morty	Morty's alien ex-girlfiend (Unnamed Alien Girl), additional voices	Episode: "The Curicksous Case of Bethjamin Button"
2026	Adventure Time: Side Quests	Softabitha	Episode: "Island of Shame"
2026	Chibiverse	Webby Vanderquack	2 episodes
2026	The Loud House	Jonas	Episode: "My Science Fair Lady"

=== Video games ===
List of voice performances in video games
Year	Title	Role	Notes
2020	Fallout 76: Steel Dawn	Marcia Leone	
2022	MultiVersus	Velma Dinkley	

== Other credits ==
Year	Title	Role	Notes
2014	Stripped	Kate	Documentary film; also performs the song "Pictures Telling Stories", which she co-wrote with Gloria Calderón Kellett
2020	Phineas and Ferb the Movie: Candace Against the Universe	Songwriter	Co-wrote "Meet Our Leader" and "You are the Chosen One" with Dan Povenmire and Martin Olson
2024	After Midnight	Herself	Episode 70
