= Pitch (TV series) =

2016 American drama television series

- Genre: Drama
- Created by: Dan Fogelman; Rick Singer
- Starring: Kylie Bunbury; Mark-Paul Gosselaar; Mark Consuelos; Mo McRae; Meagan Holder; Tim Jo; Dan Lauria; Ali Larter
- Composers: Black Violin; Jon Ehrlich; Jason Derlatka
- Country of origin: United States
- Original language: English
- No. of seasons: 1
- No. of episodes: 10

Production
- Executive producers: Dan Fogelman; Rick Singer; Kevin Falls; Helen Bartlett; Paris Barclay; Jess Rosenthal; Tony Bill
- Producer: Neal Ahern Jr.
- Production location: San Diego, California
- Cinematography: Yasu Tanida
- Editors: Howard Ledger; Joel Goodman
- Running time: 45–47 minutes
- Production companies: Barnstorm Films; Left Coast Productions; Rhode Island Ave. Productions; 20th Century Fox Television

Original release
- Network: Fox
- Release: September 22 – December 8, 2016

Pitch is an American drama television series created by Dan Fogelman and Rick Singer, that aired on Fox from September 22 to December 8, 2016. The series was commissioned on May 10, 2016.

On May 1, 2017, Fox canceled the series after one season.

== Plot ==
The series, set in the confines of Major League Baseball, sets its focus on a young pitcher noted for her screwball pitch who becomes the first woman to play in the Major Leagues when she is called up by the San Diego Padres.

== Cast ==
=== Main ===
- Kylie Bunbury as Genevieve "Ginny" Baker, a rookie pitcher and the first woman to play in Major League Baseball
- Mark-Paul Gosselaar as Michael "Mike" Lawson, the Padres' captain and veteran catcher who is nearing the end of a Hall of Fame career
- Mark Consuelos as Oscar Arguella, the Padres' general manager
- Mo McRae as Blip Sanders, an amalgam of Bip Roberts and Reggie Sanders, is a Padres outfielder who is a friend and former minor league teammate of Ginny's
- Meagan Holder as Evelyn Sanders, Blip's wife and Ginny's friend
- Tim Jo as Eliot, Ginny's social media manager
- Dan Lauria as Al Luongo, the Padres' manager
- Ali Larter as Amelia Slater, Ginny's agent

=== Recurring ===
- Michael Beach as William "Bill" Baker, Ginny's father
- B. J. Britt as Will Baker, Ginny's older brother who is eager to capitalize on her fame and start his own sports bar
- Bob Balaban as Franklin "Frank" Reid, the Padres' owner
- Kelly Jenrette as Rhonda, Oscar's assistant
- Kevin Connolly as Charlie Graham, the Padres' interim president of operations who is a strong proponent of sabermetrics
- Jack McGee as Buck Garland, the Padres' bench coach who is Luongo's right-hand man
- Christian Ochoa as Livan Duarte, the Padres' backup catcher and Lawson's heir-apparent, who is a recent immigrant from Cuba
- JoAnna Garcia Swisher as Rachel Patrick, a sports newscaster and Mike's ex-wife
- Sarah Shahi as Natalie Luongo, Al's daughter who is also dating Oscar

== Episodes ==
No.	Title	Directed by	Written by	Original release date	Prod. code	US viewers (millions)
1	"Pilot"	Paris Barclay	Dan Fogelman & Rick Singer	September 22, 2016	1AZL01	4.23
Ginny Baker becomes the first woman to play in Major League Baseball when she is called up from the minor leagues. Her first start is a disaster, with Ginny throwing just 10 pitches (all balls) and not recording an out. After the owner forces the team's manager to keep her on, Ginny receives inspiration from both her father and the team's catcher and records the win in her second start. A series of flashbacks shows her journey from Little League to the present. It is revealed that her father actually died six years earlier in a car accident.
2	"The Interim"	Paris Barclay	Dan Fogelman	September 29, 2016	1AZL02	3.68
Ginny's presence is an extreme distraction for the team. A video surfaces of Al making misogynist comments about Ginny. In flashbacks, we see how Ginny met her agent.
3	"Beanball"	Kenneth Fink	Kevin Falls	October 6, 2016	1AZL03	3.50
In a series of flashbacks, we learn something new and unexpected about one of Ginny's past relationships. After the Padres are involved in a beanball fight, Ginny draws closer to being accepted as one of the guys.
4	"The Break"	Regina King	Rick Singer	October 13, 2016	1AZL04	2.91
Baker is named to the All-Star team by the Commissioner, but surrenders a home run to Salvador Pérez. Her mom makes an uncomfortable appearance and it is revealed in a flashback that Baker's mom was having an affair with another man while Baker's father was still alive. Mike Lawson contemplates a career after baseball, while Oscar works covertly to sign a much sought-after Cuban refugee catcher who may force Lawson out of a job.
5	"Alfonzo Guzman-Chavez"	Paris Barclay	Becky Hartman Edwards	October 27, 2016	1AZL05	2.91
In the final hours before the Major League trade deadline, Ginny fears Blip may not remain with the Padres. Meanwhile, Oscar is dealing with an abscessed tooth. In the end, Blip is not traded and stays with the Padres. It is revealed in a series of flashbacks that Ginny's best friend's father was the drunk driver of the other car during the accident that killed her father.
6	"Wear It"	Joanna Kerns	Jonathan Igla	November 3, 2016	1AZL06	2.71
After Amelia closes a major deal for Ginny with Nike, Ginny ditches the signing party to attend a more down-to-earth party with a waitress she met at the Nike event. Ginny then blows the Nike deal when she is captured on video donning a rival company's sneakers and leaping into a pool. Amelia sees this as a cry for help and Ginny admits she's having trouble with all the fame baseball has brought her.
7	"San Francisco"	Mary Lou Belli	Eli Attie & Kevin Falls	November 10, 2016	1AZL07	2.64
Ginny deals with the aftermath of nude photos that she sent to an old boyfriend being leaked online, but the team comes up with a way to distract the public and lessen the impact. Lawson is informed that the Padres are bringing up the young Cuban sensation Livan Duarte, dubbed the team's "catcher of the future." Luongo angers Lawson by saying the team wants him to learn to play first base. Flashbacks show Mike living a troubled childhood with a single mom who used him to con people.
8	"Unstoppable Forces & Immovable Objects"	Chris Koch	Becky Hartman Edwards & Ester Lou Weithers	November 17, 2016	1AZL08	2.47
It is approaching August 31, the last day players can be traded and remain playoff-eligible for their new teams. Charlie proposes to Oscar that, with Duarte playing well, they should consider trading Lawson to a contender, but they first have to get him to waive his no-trade clause. Ginny's brother returns with a proposal to open a sports bar named "Screwgies" (a reference to Ginny's screwball, her best pitch). Despite Amelia's cautions, both Ginny and Evelyn agree to invest.
9	"Scratched"	Zetna Fuentes	Tanner Bean & Katrina Mathewson	December 1, 2016	1AZL09	2.39
Charlie and Oscar propose a deal to trade Lawson to the Chicago Cubs, despite Luongo's objections that Duarte will be a much better catcher if Lawson stays to mentor him. As Mike says his goodbyes to Ginny, the two almost kiss, but are interrupted when Mike gets a phone call saying the Cubs deal is off. Elsewhere, Evelyn sees that large amounts of her investment in Screwgies have already disappeared and confronts Ginny's brother.
10	"Don't Say It"	Paris Barclay	Dan Fogelman & Rick Singer	December 8, 2016	1AZL10	2.89
Mike deals with the fallout when teammates, especially Blip, learn that he wasn't the one who nixed the Cubs deal. Evelyn discusses the missing money from the Screwgies fund with Amelia, who then confronts Will. Will admits that he owed money for a loan on a previous business venture that failed. Meanwhile, the team wants to shut down Ginny for the season after their stat guru makes a point of how her offspeed pitches may be overtaxing her. They agree to let her have one last start, one in which she maintains a no-hitter through seven innings. Oscar implores Al to take Ginny out once she reaches 100 pitches, but Al defies him and lets an equally-stubborn Ginny pitch the next inning. Ginny makes a hard throw to first base for the third out of the eighth inning, then clutches her elbow in pain. As the episode ends, she is entering an MRI machine and does not know if she will ever pitch again.

== Production ==
=== Development ===
A pilot was sold on September 8, 2015, by series creators Dan Fogelman and Rick Singer. On January 14, 2016, Fox ordered the pilot to be shot. The creators opened up a casting call on February 24, 2016. The pilot episode was picked up to series on May 10, 2016. Major League Baseball cooperated in the production of the series.

=== Filming ===
The series was filmed in San Diego, California, and features the Padres, the club the protagonist plays for. Producers also planned to use Petco Park in downtown San Diego to shoot scenes when the Padres are away or during the off season.

=== Casting ===
On January 14, 2016, Kylie Bunbury was cast as Ginny. On February 11, 2016, Mark-Paul Gosselaar was cast as Mike Lawson. On February 23, 2016, Mo McRae, Meagan Holder, and Tim Jo were cast as Blip, Evelyne, and Eliot respectively. On February 29, 2016, Dan Lauria was cast as Al Luongo. On March 10, 2016, Ali Larter replaced Elisabeth Shue as Amelia Slater. On May 10, 2016, Mark Consuelos was cast as Oscar Arguella, the team's general manager and president.

== Cancellation and potential second season ==
Pitch was canceled by Fox in May 2017 after one season. Despite strong reviews, the show faced tough competition, especially Thursday Night Football. Co-star Dan Lauria expressed his frustration, saying, “Fox, in their infinite, but not so wise wisdom, has decided to cancel Pitch.” He added, “Pitch was a great experience... our cast was the most professional I ever worked with, not a headache in the bunch.” Star Kylie Bunbury, who played Ginny Baker, shared her thoughts on Instagram: “Ginny Baker has profoundly changed my life... I wasn’t ready to let go of Ginny, but more than anything I wasn’t ready to let go of my Pitch family.”

For season 2, Showrunner Kevin Falls planned to begin with Spring Training, where "a lot of personal things happen to players" like injuries, trades, and manager changes. Ginny, no longer a rookie, would face the challenge of fighting to "win her job back," with Reilly noting, “We’re not going to make it easy for her, but she’s going to do it.” The season would also explore a storyline involving a gay player, which MLB quickly approved through its "department of inclusion." Ultimately, the focus would be on Ginny's comeback after her injury, with Reilly stating, "Ginny is very much alone and doesn’t have a lot of allies," setting up her journey of resilience and rebuilding relationships.

== Reception ==
Pitch received positive reviews from television critics, with Bunbury's performance receiving praise. The editors of TV Guide placed Pitch fourth among the top ten picks for the most anticipated new shows of the 2016–2017 season. Its review, from writer Liz Rafferty, stated, "Not since Friday Night Lights have we seen a 'sports' show that managed to deliver week after week, making viewers feel as invested in the characters' personal dramas as we were in the final scores of the games" and added that "Pitch has the potential to pick up that torch." She also had high praise for Bunbury, whom she cited as a "breakout star, not to mention her (fictional) character Ginny Baker, the first woman to pitch in the MLB, to be a role model for young female athletes everywhere".

Based on 55 reviews, the show holds a 93% "Fresh" score on Rotten Tomatoes, with an average rating of 6.9/10. The website's critics consensus reads, "A terrific lead performance and well-constructed setup and timely themes make Pitch a home run." On Metacritic, which uses a weighted average, the show holds a score of 69/100, based on 27 critics, indicating "generally favorable" reviews.

== Home media ==
DVD name	Ep #	Release date
Pitch: The Complete Series	10	July 17, 2018

== See also ==
- Women in baseball
