= Jake in Progress =

- Genre: Sitcom
- Created by: Austin Winsberg
- Starring: John Stamos; Wendie Malick; Rick Hoffman; Ian Gomez
- Theme music composer: Mark Kilian; Daniel Licht
- Composers: Mark Kilian; David Kitay; William Levine; Daniel Licht
- Country of origin: United States
- Original language: English
- No. of seasons: 2
- No. of episodes: 21 (7 unaired)

Production
- Executive producers: Brad Grey; Jeffrey Richman; Peter Traugott; Austin Winsberg
- Producers: Andrew Green; Jeffrey Morton; Ari Posner; John Stamos
- Camera setup: Single-camera
- Running time: 60 minutes
- Production companies: Brad Grey Television; 20th Century Fox Television

Original release
- Network: ABC
- Release: March 13, 2005 – January 9, 2006

Jake in Progress is an American sitcom television series broadcast on ABC from March 13, 2005, to January 9, 2006. Created by Austin Winsberg, the show was originally conceived as a real-time comedy; the first season was to show the first date of Jake and a woman. This was dropped during development, and the show became more conventional and episodic. The first aired episode reflected the original plan, covering the first half-hour of a date.

== Synopsis ==
The main character is Jake (John Stamos), a New York City publicist-to-the-stars who tries to change his womanizing ways as he tries to find the woman of his dreams. Stamos' co-stars in the show are Naomi (Wendie Malick), Jake's boss at the Magnum PR Agency; Adrian (Ian Gomez), Jake's best friend; and Patrick (Rick Hoffman), the performance artist who always appears at the most inopportune times.

== Cast ==
- John Stamos as Jake Phillips
- Wendie Malick as Naomi Clark
- Rick Hoffman as Patrick Van Dorn
- Ian Gomez as Adrian

== Reception ==
The show averaged 5.5 million viewers in its first season and was initially canceled. However, the network reversed course and announced the show would return as the lead-out from a highly anticipated series, Emily's Reasons Why Not. The Jake character was softened somewhat in the second season in an effort to make him more relatable. The first night of the sitcom pairing fared poorly in the ratings; after one week, ABC immediately scheduled a rerun of The Bachelor during the one-hour block for the following week, putting both shows on indefinite hiatus. ABC confirmed on May 13 that Jake had been canceled.

== Episodes ==
=== Series overview ===
Season	Episodes	Originally released	
Season	Episodes	First released	Last released
1	13	March 13, 2005	April 21, 2005
2	8	January 9, 2006	

=== Season 1 (2005) ===
No. overall	No. in season	Title	Directed by	Written by	Original release date	Prod. code	Viewers (millions)
1	1	"Pilot"	Michael Spiller	Austin Winsberg	March 13, 2005	1AKC79	13.96
2	2	"Stand By Your Man"	Michael Spiller	Linda Wallem	March 13, 2005	1AKC05	12.01
3	3	"Rivals and Departures"	Michael Spiller	Stephen Lloyd	March 17, 2005	1AKC03	7.03
4	4	"Ubusy?"	Michael Spiller	Jeffrey Richman	March 17, 2005	1AKC07	6.64
5	5	"Sign Language"	Lev L. Spiro	Chris Marcil	March 24, 2005	1AKC02	6.46
6	6	"Loose Thread"	Peter Lauer	Sam Johnson, Chris Marcil & Austin Winsberg	March 24, 2005	1AKC09	6.75
7	7	"Take a Number"	Lev L. Spiro	Sam Johnson	March 31, 2005	1AKC04	5.66
8	8	"Desperate Houseguy"	Jeffrey Melman	Chris Harris	March 31, 2005	1AKC06	5.76
9	9	"Harpy Birthday"	Jeffrey Melman	Stephen Lloyd	April 7, 2005	1AKC08	5.08
10	10	"Boys' Night Out"	Joe Pennella	Linda Wallem	April 7, 2005	1AKC10	5.25
11	11	"Check, Please"	Michael Spiller	Austin Winsberg	April 14, 2005	1AKC01	4.00
12	12	"Jake or the Fat Man"	Gail Mancuso	Chris Harris	April 21, 2005	1AKC11	4.42
13	13	"Henry Porter and the Coitus Interruptus"	Michael Spiller	Austin Winsberg	April 21, 2005	1AKC12	4.27

=== Season 2 (2006) ===
No. overall	No. in season	Title	Directed by	Written by	Original release date	Prod. code	Viewers (millions)
14	1	"The Lying, The Watch and Jake's Wardrobe"	Michael Spiller	Bob Kushell & Austin Winsberg	January 9, 2006	2AKC01	5.58
15	2	"The Annie-dote"	Michael Spiller	Bob Kushell & Austin Winsberg	Unaired	2AKC02	N/A
16	3	"Eyebrow Girl vs. Smirk Face"	Paul Lazarus	Kerry Ehrin	Unaired	2AKC03	N/A
17	4	"The Hot One"	N/A	N/A	Unaired	2AKC04	N/A
18	5	"PB & J"	Ken Whittingham	Andrew Green	Unaired	2AKC05	N/A
19	6	"The Elaine-Elaine"	Michael Spiller	Jeff Greenstein	Unaired	2AKC06	N/A
20	7	"Notting Hell"	N/A	N/A	Unaired	2AKC07	N/A
21	8	"The Two Jakes"	Victor Nelli, Jr.	Jane Espenson	Unaired	2AKC08	N/A
