= Elf: Buddy's Musical Christmas =

2014 television special

- Promotional poster
- Genre: Musical; Comedy
- Based on: Elf (film) by David Berenbaum Elf (musical) by: Thomas Meehan; Bob Martin; Matthew Sklar; Chad Beguelin
- Written by: Thomas Meehan; Bob Martin; Aaron Horvath; Michael Jelenic
- Directed by: Mark Caballero; Seamus Walsh
- Starring: Jim Parsons; Mark Hamill; Kate Micucci; Ed Asner; Max Charles; Rachael MacFarlane
- Music by: Matthew Sklar; Christopher Guardino
- Country of origin: United States
- Original language: English

Production
- Executive producers: Sam Register; Toby Emmerich; Mark Kaufman
- Producers: Chris Finnegan; Aaron Horvath; Michael Jelenic
- Cinematography: Ralph Kaechele
- Editor: Mike Wright
- Running time: 43 minutes
- Production companies: Warner Bros. Animation; New Line Cinema

Original release
- Network: NBC
- Release: December 16, 2014

Elf: Buddy's Musical Christmas is a 2014 American animated Christmas musical comedy television special based on the 2003 film Elf and its musical adaptation. It was directed by Mark Caballero and Seamus Walsh, and written by Thomas Meehan, Bob Martin, Aaron Horvath, Michael Jelenic. While Ed Asner reprises his role of Santa Claus from the film, the rest of the cast consists of Jim Parsons, Mark Hamill, Kate Micucci, Max Charles, and Rachael MacFarlane. The special was produced by Warner Bros. Animation and New Line Cinema, with animation services produced by Screen Novelties, and premiered on December 16, 2014, on NBC. The special was met with positive reviews from critics.

== Plot ==
Santa Claus narrates the story of Buddy: a human whose mother gave him up for adoption before she died following his birth, and who crawled into Santa's toy sack that Christmas Eve. He was unknowingly taken to the North Pole and raised into adulthood by Santa as one of his Christmas elves, unaware of his actual origins despite his height difference and lack of toy-making skills. Overhearing the truth about his species, Buddy confronts Santa, who encourages him to travel to New York City, where his birth father Walter Hobbs now works as an executive for a children's book publishing firm. Buddy also learns that Walter is on Santa's naughty list due to his lacking belief in Santa.

Buddy arrives at the publishing office in the Empire State Building and musically greets Walter, who mistakes him for a singing telegram entertainer and calls for security to escort him to the nearby Macy's Department Store. Buddy gets a job as one of the "elves" for the North Pole Village and becomes smitten with cynical coworker Jovie, successfully inviting her on a date. The next day, he exposes a mall Santa as an impostor leading to a scuffle that ends with the police taking him to the Hobbs family's apartment. He helps Walter's wife Emily and son Michael complete a school science project and is allowed to stay for the night.

The following morning, several DNA tests confirm that Buddy is Walter's son. Walter reluctantly takes Buddy to his office at Emily's insistence, where his supervisor Mr. Greenway threatens to fire him if he does not publish a successful new book by Christmas Eve. That evening, Buddy takes Jovie to a romantic dinner at Tavern on the Green and helps bring out her Christmas spirit by having her sing "A Christmas Song". Excited to share this news with Walter, Buddy makes it "snow" in the office by shredding a manuscript Walter was working on. Enraged, Walter expels Buddy from the office and denounces him as his son.

A despondent and hungry Buddy encounters some out-of-work Santa actors at a Chinese restaurant and delays in arriving for his next date with Jovie, to whom he gives a snow globe Santa gave him. She is disappointed and departs. Emily and Michael read Buddy's goodbye letter and set out to retrieve him, but not before noticing Santa's sleigh outside their window. The pair and Buddy arrive at the Empire State Building where Walter is frantically trying to craft a pitch for Mr. Greenway. Buddy suggests a story based on his adventure. Mr. Greenway thinks it should be about a horse and orders Walter to work through Christmas on the idea. When Mr. Greenway rudely criticizes Walter's sons, Walter quits his job. Michael informs Buddy about Santa's sleigh and the Hobbs family races to Central Park. Buddy realizes the sleigh needs Christmas spirit to be able to fly again.

At Central Park, Buddy takes a microphone from a news crew covering what appears to be a UFO event and encourages everyone watching the news to spread Christmas spirit to repower Santa's sleigh. Jovie arrives and begins singing "A Christmas Song", inspiring everyone watching to sing along and thus restoring the sleigh's flight. Santa invites Buddy to come home to the North Pole, but he chooses to stay in New York, having found a new purpose in making the residents happy. Some time later, Buddy and Jovie settle down and have a son named Baby Buddy. Mr. Greenway is never seen or heard from again. The whole Hobbs family visits Santa's North Pole residence on Christmas Day per their new annual tradition.

== Cast ==
- Jim Parsons as Buddy Hobbs, an eccentric but well-meaning young man who was raised as a Christmas elf. Parsons replaces Will Ferrell, who played Buddy in the film.
- Mark Hamill as Walter Hobbs, an overworked children's book publishing executive and Buddy's estranged father. Hamill replaces James Caan, who played Walter in the film.
- Kate Micucci as Jovie, a Macy's North Pole Village employee and Buddy's love interest. Micucci replaces Zooey Deschanel, who played Jovie in the film.
- Ed Asner as Santa Claus, Buddy's adoptive father. Asner is the only actor to reprise his role from the original film.
- Max Charles as Michael Hobbs, Buddy's younger half-brother and Walter and Emily's son. Charles replaces Daniel Tay, who played Michael in the film.
- Rachael MacFarlane as:
  - Emily Hobbs, Walter's wife and Michael's mother. Mary Steenburgen played Emily in the film.
  - Fake Santa Claus #3
- Fred Armisen as Matthews, one of Walter's colleagues
- Gilbert Gottfried as Mr. Greenway, Walter's demanding boss. Gottfried replaces Michael Lerner, who played Mr. Greenway in the film.
- Jay Leno as Fake Santa Claus #1
- Steve Higgins as Chadwick, one of Walter's colleagues
- Matt Lauer as Mr. Sea Serpent, one Buddy's animal friends
- Kevin Michael Richardson as:
  - Jerry Hobbs, an unrelated New York citizen whom Buddy mistakes for his father
  - Fake Santa Claus #2
- Kevin Shinick as Fake Santa Claus #4

Additional voices by Rachel Bloom, Larry Dorf, Rachel Ramras, and Kevin Shinick.

== Reception ==
The special was viewed by 4.82 million viewers. Elf: Buddy's Musical Christmas received positive reviews from critics. The review-aggregation website Metacritic, which assigns a weighted average rating out of 100 top reviews from mainstream critics, calculated a score of 74 out of 100 based on 8 reviews, indicating "generally favorable" reviews. Ray Rahman of Entertainment Weekly gave the special a B+, saying "Elf: Buddy's Musical Christmas probably won't become a classic, but it's a fun break from the usual standards." Brian Lowry of Variety gave the special a positive review, saying "Elf: Buddy's Musical Christmas suits the genre well, and suggests there is an alternative to simply running the sprockets off old holiday perennials. And in albeit in a minor way, that's good reason to be happy — if not all the time, at least for an hour or so." Erik Adams of The A.V. Club gave the special a B, saying "Narratively and emotionally rushed, at least Buddy's Musical Christmas smartly emphasizes its animated nature, through visual inventiveness and top-flight voice talent."

== Musical numbers ==
All tracks are written by Matthew Sklar and Chad Beguelin.

No.	Title	Performer(s)	Length
1.	"Happy All the Time"	Fred Armisen, Ed Asner, Rachel Bloom, Larry Dorf, Jim Parsons, Rachel Ramras and Kevin Shinick	2:27
2.	"World's Greatest Dad"	Parsons	1:03
3.	"I'll Believe In You"	Rachael MacFarlane & Max Charles	2:08
4.	"Sparklejollytwinklejingley"	MacFarlane, Charles and Parsons	1:47
5.	"A Christmas Song"	Kate Micucci and Parsons	1:59
6.	"Nobody Cares About Santa"	Shinick, MacFarlane, Kevin Michael Richardson, Jay Leno and Parsons	1:48
7.	"There Is a Santa Claus"	MacFarlane & Charles	1:17
8.	"A Christmas Song (Reprise)"	Bloom, Charles, Dorf, Mark Hamill, MacFarlane, Micucci, Ramras and Shinick	3:31
9.	"The Story of Buddy The Elf"	Cast	2:32
Total length:			18:32

== Home media ==
Warner Home Video released Elf: Buddy's Musical Christmas on DVD and Blu-ray on November 3, 2015.

== Accolades ==
The film was nominated for seven Annie Awards and won one for Character Design in an Animated Television/Broadcast Production.
