= Scooby-Doo! Shaggy's Showdown =

Film by Matt Peters

- DVD cover
- Directed by: Matt Peters
- Written by: Candie Kelty Langdale; Doug Langdale
- Based on: Scooby-Doo by William Hanna, Joseph Barbera, Iwao Takamoto, Joe Ruby, & Ken Spears
- Produced by: Brandon Vietti; Alan Burnett
- Starring: Frank Welker; Grey DeLisle; Matthew Lillard; Kate Micucci
- Edited by: Steve Donmyer
- Music by: Kristopher Carter; Michael McCuistion; Lolita Ritmanis
- Production company: Warner Bros. Animation
- Distributed by: Warner Home Video
- Release date: January 31, 2017
- Running time: 80 minutes
- Country: United States
- Language: English

Scooby-Doo! Shaggy's Showdown is a 2017 direct-to-DVD animated western comedy mystery film, and the twenty-eighth entry in the direct-to-video series of Scooby-Doo films. It was released digitally on January 31, 2017, and on DVD on February 14, 2017.

== Plot ==
Shaggy's distant cousin Tawny invites the Mystery Gang to visit her ranch in Sorghum City, a town that has recently been terrorized by vandalism, apparently caused by the ghost of Dapper Jack Rogers (Shaggy and Tawny's ancestor). When the gang arrives, everyone who encounters them initially flees, believing Shaggy is Dapper Jack. Tawny and her neighbor Rafe show the gang Jack's picture, revealing Shaggy looks just like his ancestor. They also tell the gang the legend of Dapper Jack, a famous horseman and roper turned outlaw. Wearing bandanna masks, Jack went on a crime spree, before he was reported killed in the desert by then-Sheriff Rufus Carmichael. This legend brought tourists to the town, before the ghostly attacks started driving people away.

The gang decides to stop Jack, and moves into the ranch. They meet their fellow guests, including famous preteen musician Buddy G (who has severe equinophobia) and his family. That night, Dapper Jack appears, shoots green fire from a gun, and escapes. Fred finds evidence of boric acid, which caused the green flames. Tawny explains that the Black Rattler Land Company has been buying up businesses that were foreclosed after the ghost drove their profits down; her own ranch is now in imminent danger of the same.

Ranch hands Larry and Kyle start teaching some of the guests how to rope and ride horses, but Buddy is too scared to try. Fred also has difficulties, but Shaggy proves to be a natural. Velma has a horse dander allergy, so she and Daphne leave to visit a local museum. They find indications that someone took a diary, potentially belonging to Sheriff Carmichael, from the museum's storeroom.

Dapper Jack appears and starts a barn fire, setting a dangerous horse named Buckstitch loose, but Scooby manages to calm the bronco by speaking to him in animal language. After a couple false leads, the gang decides to investigate Jack's grave, but are confronted by Jack's very angry ghost. The gang borrows a canoe from a closed rental agency and flees downriver; they are nearly washed over a waterfall, but Shaggy is able to rescue them with his newfound roping skills.

With no other leads to follow, Shaggy decides to enter the upcoming rodeo and have Scooby secretly talk to the broncos so they will let Shaggy win the money for Tawny's mortgage. After Buddy opens the rodeo with a short concert, Scooby helps Buddy finally overcome his equinophobia, but forgets to talk to the broncos for Shaggy. Much to everyone's surprise, Shaggy is able to break a wild horse on his own and win.

The ghost causes a cattle stampede, putting Buddy's family in danger, but the Mystery Gang are able to save them and get some UV powder on the ghost. At the post-rodeo party, a blacklight reveals the powder on Kyle, exposing him as the "ghost", but not the mastermind. Finding a Black Rattler business card, Velma recognizes the unpopular font on it as the same one on Tawny's website, which Rafe designed for her. The gang also discovers Carmichael's diary where Rafe hid it.

Velma reveals to the crowd that Rafe is a secret Black Rattler executive. After starting the ghost scheme, he had discovered the diary; in it, Carmichael confessed that he had murdered the well-liked Dapper Jack out of jealousy, some time before Jack's death was actually reported. Carmichael then committed the legendary crime spree himself in disguise, to tarnish Jack's name. Rafe hid the diary so he could continue to use the false legend to frighten people.

Rafe escapes the lasso and steals Shaggy's prize money and attempts to flee in a stagecoach; but Scooby and Buddy G manage to get aboard and release two of Rafe's horses, causing him to crash. Shaggy rides up on Buckstitch; a concussed Rafe sees Shaggy standing over him, and he mistakes him for Dapper Jack, and apologizes.

As Rafe is arrested and the gang prepares to leave Sorghum City, Tawny promises to spread the truth about Jack, and thanks the gang for their help. The Mystery Machine drives away, and Shaggy and Scooby notice the real spirit of Dapper Jack watching them from a ledge; he tips his hat to them, before disappearing.

== Cast ==
- Frank Welker as Scooby-Doo and Fred Jones
- Matthew Lillard as Shaggy Rogers
- Grey DeLisle as Daphne Blake
- Kate Micucci as Velma Dinkley
- Carlos Alazraqui as Larry
- Max Charles as Buddy G
- Gary Cole as Rafe
- Jessica DiCicco as Desdemona Gunderson
- Tania Gunadi as Carol
- Eric Ladin as Kyle
- Nolan North as David and Dave
- Stephen Tobolowsky as Andy Gunderson
- Lauren Tom as Sharon
- Melissa Villaseñor as Tawny Rogers
- Kari Wahlgren as Midge Gunderson
- Gary Anthony Williams as Cook
- John Schwab as Dapper Jack Rogers
