= Danny Collins (film) =

2015 film

- Theatrical release poster
- Directed by: Dan Fogelman
- Written by: Dan Fogelman
- Produced by: Nimitt Mankad; Jessie Nelson
- Starring: Al Pacino; Annette Bening; Jennifer Garner; Bobby Cannavale; Christopher Plummer
- Cinematography: Steve Yedlin
- Edited by: Julie Monroe
- Music by: Ryan Adams; Theodore Shapiro
- Production companies: Big Indie Pictures; ShivHans Pictures
- Distributed by: Bleecker Street (United States); Mister Smith Entertainment (International)
- Release date: March 20, 2015
- Running time: 107 minutes
- Country: United States
- Language: English
- Budget: $10 million
- Box office: $10.8 million

Danny Collins is a 2015 American comedy-drama film written and directed by Dan Fogelman in his feature directorial debut. Inspired by the true story of folk singer Steve Tilston, the film stars Al Pacino, Annette Bening, Jennifer Garner, Bobby Cannavale and Christopher Plummer. The film was released in theaters on March 20, 2015.

For his performance, Pacino was nominated for the Golden Globe Award for Best Actor – Motion Picture Musical or Comedy at the 73rd Golden Globe Awards.

== Plot ==
Aging 1970s rocker Danny Collins cannot give up his hard-living ways, but his manager Frank Grubman uncovers a 40-year-old undelivered letter to him from John Lennon. After reading the letter, Danny decides to change his way of life. He travels to New Jersey to attempt to connect for the first time with his grown son, Tom Donnelly, born from a casual relationship with a woman who died 10 years earlier. Tom has a wife, Samantha, and seven-year-old daughter Hope, and is expecting a second child.

Seeking a new start, Danny forswears touring and checks into a Hilton hotel in New Jersey, much to the delight of the young staff. He begins to woo the hotel manager Mary, and tries to set up her assistant Jamie on a date.

Tom initially rejects the father who he believes abandoned him, but Danny persists, arranging for Hope, who has ADHD, to be accepted into an exclusive school for children with special needs. He learns that Tom has what doctors say may be terminal leukemia, inherited from his mother, and he begins to attend doctor's visits with him. Tom's dislike of his father gradually gives way to the need for his support.

Inspired by his feelings for Mary and his happiness from having a family, Danny begins to write new songs, and he books a one-night performance at a small club. However, when the audience demands that he play his old material, Danny loses his nerve and gives a rote performance. Ashamed, he resumes doing drugs, damaging his relationship with Mary and his family. Tom confronts him, causing Danny to angrily reveal Tom's leukemia diagnosis, something of which Samantha had not been aware. Feeling betrayed, Tom tells Danny never to bother his family again.

Danny learns from Frank that his finances are in danger due to his excessive habits, and that he needs to go on tour again. Danny goes to the hotel to mend his relationship with Mary. Tom is visited by Frank, who tells him that his father, despite many flaws, is a good man. Tom finds Danny waiting at the doctor's office so that he can hear his diagnosis. Danny reassures him that everything will be all right and says that the doctor always addresses him as "Mr. Donnelly" before giving him bad news and "Tom" before giving him good news. The doctor arrives, calling him "Tom".

== Cast ==
- Al Pacino as Danny Collins
- Annette Bening as Mary Sinclair
- Jennifer Garner as Samantha Leigh Donnelly
- Bobby Cannavale as Tom Donnelly
- Christopher Plummer as Frank Grubman
- Nick Offerman as Guy DeLoach
- Cesar Evora as Gabriel
- Josh Peck as Nicky Ernst
- Scott Lawrence as Dr. Kurtz
- Fernando Colunga as Fernando
- Michelle Vieth as Selena
- Katarina Čas as Sophie
- Brian Thomas Smith as Judd (Busy Work)
- Melissa Benoist as Jamie
- Giselle Eisenberg as Hope Donnelly
- Eric Michael Roy as Young Danny Collins

== Background ==
The story is based on a real-life situation in which John Lennon and Yoko Ono wrote a letter to the English folk singer Steve Tilston in 1971, but it remained unknown to him for 34 years. The real letter was signed "John + Yoko", while the letter in the movie was signed "John".

== Production ==
In November 2010, Steve Carell was attached to star in the film, then titled Imagine, as the rocker's son, but he ultimately dropped out due to scheduling conflicts. In June 2011, Al Pacino was in discussions to star in the film. In October 2012, Jeremy Renner was announced as Carell's replacement, and Julianne Moore also joined the film. Both were eventually also replaced by Bobby Cannavale and Annette Bening, respectively.

Filming began in July 2013 in Los Angeles. The crew filmed a scene with Pacino during a concert of the band Chicago in Los Angeles. In November 2014, it was reported that the film had been retitled Danny Collins, and that Ryan Adams would compose the score with Theodore Shapiro. The film also switched distributors from Warner Bros. Pictures to Bleecker Street.

== Reception ==
On Rotten Tomatoes, the film has an approval rating of 77%, based on 133 reviews, with an average rating of 6.44/10. The site's critical consensus reads: "Thanks to Al Pacino's stirring central performance — and excellent work from an esteemed supporting cast — Danny Collins manages to overcome its more predictable and heavy-handed moments to deliver a heartfelt tale of redemption." On Metacritic, the film has a score of 58 out of 100, based on 31 critics, indicating "mixed or average" reviews"

Entertainment Weekly's Chris Nashawaty named the film one of 2015's "overlooked gems".

In addition to Pacino's Golden Globe Award nomination, two of the film's original songs, "Don't Look Down" and "Hey Baby Doll", were long-listed for the 2015 Academy Award for Best Original Song.
