= Max Charles =

American actor (born 2003)

- Born: Max Joseph Charles; August 18, 2003 (age 23); Dayton, Ohio, U.S.
- Occupations: Actor; photographer
- Years active: 2010–present
- Spouse: Emma Tyni (m. 2026)

External image
- Charles at an event for The Strain in the 2017, San Diego Comic-Con

Max Joseph Charles (born August 18, 2003) is an American actor. He appeared in the 2012 film The Three Stooges, as young Peter Parker in The Amazing Spider-Man, and had a role in the ABC comedy science fiction series The Neighbors.

In 2014, Charles voiced Sherman in DreamWorks' Mr. Peabody & Sherman, and reprised the role in The Mr. Peabody & Sherman Show. He played the recurring role of Spin in Disney XD's Lab Rats: Bionic Island. He voiced Kion on the Disney Junior series The Lion Guard, and Harvey Beaks on the Nickelodeon series of the same name. He also played Zach Goodweather on seasons two through four of the TV series The Strain, replacing Ben Hyland from the first season. Max Charles also voiced Buddy G in the direct-to-video Scooby-Doo film Scooby-Doo! Shaggy's Showdown.

== Early life ==
Charles was born Max Joseph Charles in Dayton, Ohio on August 18, 2003. He has three older brothers, Logan, Brock, and Mason, who are also actors.

== Career ==
He first appeared in a third-season episode of the HBO series True Blood in August 2010. His later television guest starring work includes the Fox series Raising Hope, the NBC series Community, the TV Land series Hot in Cleveland, and the Disney Channel series Jessie. Charles has also had roles in the 2010 television film November Christmas and the 2011 direct-to-DVD film Spooky Buddies.

In early 2012, Charles appeared in The Three Stooges as Peezer, a young orphan who encounters the three title characters. That year, he also appeared in the films Least Among Saints and White Space. In 2012, Charles played a young Peter Parker in The Amazing Spider-Man, a role whose adult counterpart was Andrew Garfield. In fall 2012, Charles began co-starring in the ABC comedy science fiction series The Neighbors. Charles voiced Sherman in DreamWorks Animation's Mr. Peabody & Sherman (2014).

Charles has four brothers, and received his first audition after a producer asked one of his brothers to audition for a role; Charles asked his mother if he could accompany his brother, and was hired for his first acting role. In The Three Stooges, Charles can be seen in a scene with all three brothers. Charles is represented by CESD Talent Agency and Symington Talent Management. In January 2015, he was cast as Zach Goodweather, on the television series The Strain.

He voiced the title character in the Nickelodeon series Harvey Beaks.

He also had a recurring role in the Disney XD TV series Lab Rats as Spin.

Charles voiced Kion on the Disney Channel television film The Lion Guard: Return of the Roar and its subsequent Disney Junior TV series The Lion Guard.

Charles was cast as Ali's best friend in the independent imaginary reality film, Ali’s Realm, which was released in 2020.

Charles was cast as the voice of "Young Long" in the Sony Pictures Animation film, Wish Dragon, which was released in 2021.

=== Photography ===
In November 2023, Charles began a photography business entitled MJCCREATIVE.

== Filmography ==
=== Television ===
Year	Title	Role	Notes
2010	True Blood	Hunter Savoy	Episode: "Everything Is Broken"
2010	Raising Hope	Male Student	Episode: "Blue Dots"
2010	November Christmas	Gordon Marks	Television film
2011	Spooky Buddies	Joseph	Direct-to-video film
2011	My Life As an Experiment	Cooper	Television film
2011	Community	Young Pierce	Episode: "Celebrity Pharmacology 212"
2011	Hot in Cleveland	Marcus	Episode: "Elka's Snowbird"
2011–2015	Super Spies	Jake	Seasons 2-4
2012	Jessie	Axel	Episode: "World Wide Web of Lies"
2012	Robot Chicken	School Kid, Cruel Kid	Voice, episode: "Executed by the State"
2012	Scent of the Missing	Charlie Johnson	Television film
2012–2014	The Neighbors	Max Weaver	44 episodes
2012–2016	Adventure Time	Young Jay, Terry, Hugo	Voice, 4 episodes
2012–2022	Family Guy	Additional voices	11 episodes
2013	The Haunted Hathaways	Teddy Munroe	Episode: "Haunted Cookie Jar"
2013–2019	American Dad!	Boy, Camper	Voice 5 episodes
2014	Rizzoli & Isles	Kevin Silver	Episode: "Tears of a Clown"
2014	The Legend of Korra	Skeptical Spirit	Voice, episode: "Korra Alone"
2014	Constantine	Henry	Episode: "Rage of Caliban"
2014	Elf: Buddy's Musical Christmas	Michael Hobbs	Voice, television special
2014	Northpole	Kevin Hastings	Television film
2015	Lab Rats	Spin	7 episodes
2015	Childrens Hospital	Billy	Episode: "With Great Power..."
2015	The Lion Guard: Return of the Roar	Kion	Voice, television film
2015–2017	The Strain	Zach Goodweather	33 episodes
2015–2017	Harvey Beaks	Harvey Beaks	Voice, 52 episodes
2015–2017	The Mr. Peabody & Sherman Show	Sherman	Voice, 52 episodes
2016–2019	The Lion Guard	Kion	Voice, 74 episodes
2017	The Lion Guard: The Rise of Scar	Kion	Voice, television film

=== Film ===
Year	Title	Role	Notes
2012	Unstable	Oliver March	
2012	The Three Stooges	Peezer	
2012	Least Among Saints	Dylan	
2012	The Amazing Spider-Man	Young Peter Parker	
2014	The Amazing Spider-Man 2	Young Peter Parker	
2014	Mr. Peabody & Sherman	Sherman	Voice
2014	The Last Survivors	Alby	
2014	American Sniper	Colton Kyle	
2016	The Angry Birds Movie	Bobby	Voice cameo
2017	Scooby-Doo! Shaggy's Showdown	Buddy G.	Voice, direct-to-video
2020	Ali's Realm	Charlie	
2021	Wish Dragon	Young Long	Voice

== Accolades ==
Year	Award	Category	Work	Result	Ref.
2013	Young Artist Award	Best Performance in a TV Series - Supporting Young Actor	The Neighbors	Nominated	
2013	Young Artist Award	Outstanding Young Ensemble in a TV Series (shared with Isabella Cramp and Ian Patrick)	The Neighbors	Won	
2016	42nd Saturn Awards	Best Performance by a Younger Actor in a Television Series	The Strain	Nominated	
2017	43rd Saturn Awards	Best Performance by a Younger Actor in a Television Series	The Strain	Nominated	
2018	44th Saturn Awards	Best Performance by a Younger Actor in a Television Series	The Strain	Nominated	

== Personal life ==
On July 31, 2026, Charles married his long-time girlfriend, Emma Tyni.
