= Tim Jo =

American television and film actor (born 1984)

- Born: Timothy William Jo; April 20, 1984 (age 42); Dallas, Texas, U.S.
- Education: Trinity University (BA)
- Occupation: Actor
- Years active: 2009-present
- Height: 172 cm (5 ft 8 in)
- Children: 2

Timothy William Jo (born April 20, 1984) is an American television and film actor, he is most famous for playing "Reggie Jackson" on the ABC comedy, The Neighbors.

== Early life and education ==
Jo was born in Dallas in 1984. As a child, he appeared as a model in catalogues and acted in television commercials. He studied computer science at Trinity University before switching his major to drama and communications, graduating in 2006.

== Career ==
Jo made his debut in The 2 Bobs in 2009, a few weeks later, he was cast in Bandslam. He joined a band after the release of the movie along with other actors, Ryan Donowho and Sarah Roemer called Animals of Kin. In 2010, he was cast in two episodes of Greek. He was later cast in a lead role in TBS, Glory Daze playing Alex Chang. In 2011, he appeared on an episode of Castle. In December 2011, he was cast in a Dan Fogelman pilot, The Neighbors. His character name in the pilot was "Joe Montana" but it was changed to "Reggie Jackson" before filming.

== Filmography ==
=== Film ===
Year	Title	Role	Notes
2009	The 2 Bobs	Moustached Gamer	
2009	Bandslam	Omar	
2009	Fame	Korean Boy	
2012	I Am Ben	David	Short
2012	Fratervention: The End of Bro'ing Out	Dr. Winer	Short
2013	Vampire Riderz	Jeff	
2015	Danny Collins	Tim	
2016	A One and a Two	Sang Yup	Short
2017	Division 19	Alden	
2017	Hook It Up!	Tommy Pak	Short
2019	Mack of all Trades	Lucas	Short
2020	Jk	Derrick	Short
2023	About Alice	Captain Choi	Short
2024	Art of a Hit	Timmy	

=== Television ===
Year	Title	Role	Notes
2010	Greek	Dewey	Recurring Cast: Season 3
2010–11	Glory Daze	Alex Chang	Main Cast
2011	Castle	Ben Lee	Episode: "Kick the Ballistics"
2012–14	The Neighbors	Reggie Jackson	Main Cast
2016	Pitch	Eliot	Main Cast
2017	Mystic Cosmic Patrol	Leo / Red Patrolman	Episode: "Potty Mouth: Part 1"
2017	SEAL Team	Evan	Episode: "Collapse"
2018–22	This Is Us	Jae-won Yoo	Recurring Cast: Season 3–5, Guest: Season 6
2021	For All Mankind	Steve Pomeranz	Recurring Cast: Season 2
2022–25	Reasonable Doubt	Daniel Kim	Main Cast
2023	Beef	Praise Band Team Member	Recurring Cast
