= The Neighbors (2012 TV series) =

American sitcom television series

- Genre: Science fiction; Sitcom; Metafiction
- Created by: Dan Fogelman
- Showrunner: Dan Fogelman
- Starring: Jami Gertz; Lenny Venito; Simon Templeman; Toks Olagundoye; Clara Mamet; Tim Jo; Ian Patrick; Max Charles; Isabella Cramp
- Theme music composer: Chris Koch; Kirker Butler
- Composers: Chris Koch; Jim Murphy; Siddhartha Khosla
- Country of origin: United States
- Original language: English
- No. of seasons: 2
- No. of episodes: 44 (list of episodes)

Production
- Executive producers: Dan Fogelman; Chris Koch; Aaron Kaplan; Jeffrey Morton
- Producers: Bari Halle; Scott Weinger
- Editors: David L. Bertman; Jonathan Schwartz; Liza Cardinale
- Camera setup: Single-camera setup
- Running time: 22 minutes
- Production companies: 17-28 Black, Inc.; Kapital Entertainment; ABC Studios

Original release
- Network: ABC
- Release: September 26, 2012 – April 11, 2014

The Neighbors is an American television science fiction sitcom that aired from September 26, 2012, to April 11, 2014, on ABC. The story line revolves around a family of humans living in a community of extraterrestrials. The series was created by Dan Fogelman, who also served as executive producer. Chris Koch, Jeffrey Morton, and Aaron Kaplan served as co-producers, and the first season was produced by ABC Studios and Kapital Entertainment.

On October 29, 2012, The Neighbors was given a full-season order of 22 episodes.

Its first season aired on ABC on Wednesdays at 8:30 pm Eastern/7:30 pm Central in the 2012–2013 television season. On May 11, 2013, The Neighbors was officially renewed for a second season, which aired on Fridays at 8:30 pm Eastern/7:30 pm Central.

On May 9, 2014, ABC canceled the series after two seasons.

== Synopsis ==
The series, set in New Jersey, revolves around a family that has relocated to a gated townhouse community called "Hidden Hills". Upon their arrival, they discover that the entire community is populated by residents from another planet. Amongst their myriad quirks, these aliens identify themselves by the names of sports celebrities, patrol the community in golf carts, dress alike, receive nourishment through their eyes and mind by reading books rather than eating, and cry green goo from their ears. The aliens have assumed human form, but they can revert to their natural appearance by clapping their hands above their heads. They have been stuck on Earth for 10 years, still awaiting instructions to return home.

== Cast and characters ==
- Jami Gertz as Debbie Weaver
- Lenny Venito as Marty Weaver
- Simon Templeman as Larry Bird
- Toks Olagundoye as Jackie Joyner-Kersee
- Clara Mamet as Amber Weaver
- Tim Jo as Reggie Jackson
- Ian Patrick as Dick Butkus
- Max Charles as Max Weaver
- Isabella Cramp as Abby Weaver

== Episodes ==
Season	Episodes	Originally released	
Season	Episodes	First released	Last released
1	22	September 26, 2012	March 27, 2013
2	22	September 20, 2013	April 11, 2014

== Development and production ==
=== Conception ===
Dan Fogelman devised the concept of the series, which was previously entitled Down to Earth. It was described as a sitcom about "a New Jersey family that moves into a gated community occupied exclusively by extraterrestrials." The American Broadcasting Company (ABC) picked up the pilot episode of The Neighbors in October 2011, with a pilot commitment. In May 2012, the show renamed to The Neighbors, and production of the program was green-lit.

Fogelman conceived The Neighbors after visiting his mother, who lived in a gated townhouse community, and stated, "you could reach out my mom's bathroom window and touch her neighbor's bathroom window", but they never spoke to or knew each other, and the idea was "who are these people that she's living between?", and what if they were all aliens? He claimed that family is the best part of humanity, and he kept "exploring stuff". Fogelman wants The Neighbors to be a show that "the whole family can watch together". He said, "It's high concept but I do want to ground it as a family sitcom".

The show's premise has been described as "goofy", and has been considered as a "high-concept" show by Entertainment Weekly. At the semi-annual press tour in Beverly Hills, ABC Entertainment President Paul Lee stated that The Neighbors has "high-concept nature", but "love[d]" it. The Neighbors was originally stated to premiere at 9:30 p.m. on Wednesday, but ABC decided to air it in 8:30 time interval. In response to this, Lee claimed that "8:30 p.m. suited the show better" as "there's so much pressure [to perform] after Modern Family". The 9:30 p.m. slot was replaced with Suburgatory. Lee wants it to be on the air for a long time, and claimed that Suburgatory would better fit in the 9:30 slot. Lee praised Fogelman, calling him a "wondering writer"; he thinks he will give a "smart piece of storytelling".

=== Production team ===
The single-camera comedy was originally produced for ABC Studios and Warner Bros. Television, but Warner Bros. Television was replaced by company Kapital Entertainment. Dan Fogelman, Chris Koch, Jeff Morton, and Aaron Kaplan executive produce the series. Chris Koch signed on to direct the pilot episode, which was written by Fogelman.

=== Casting ===
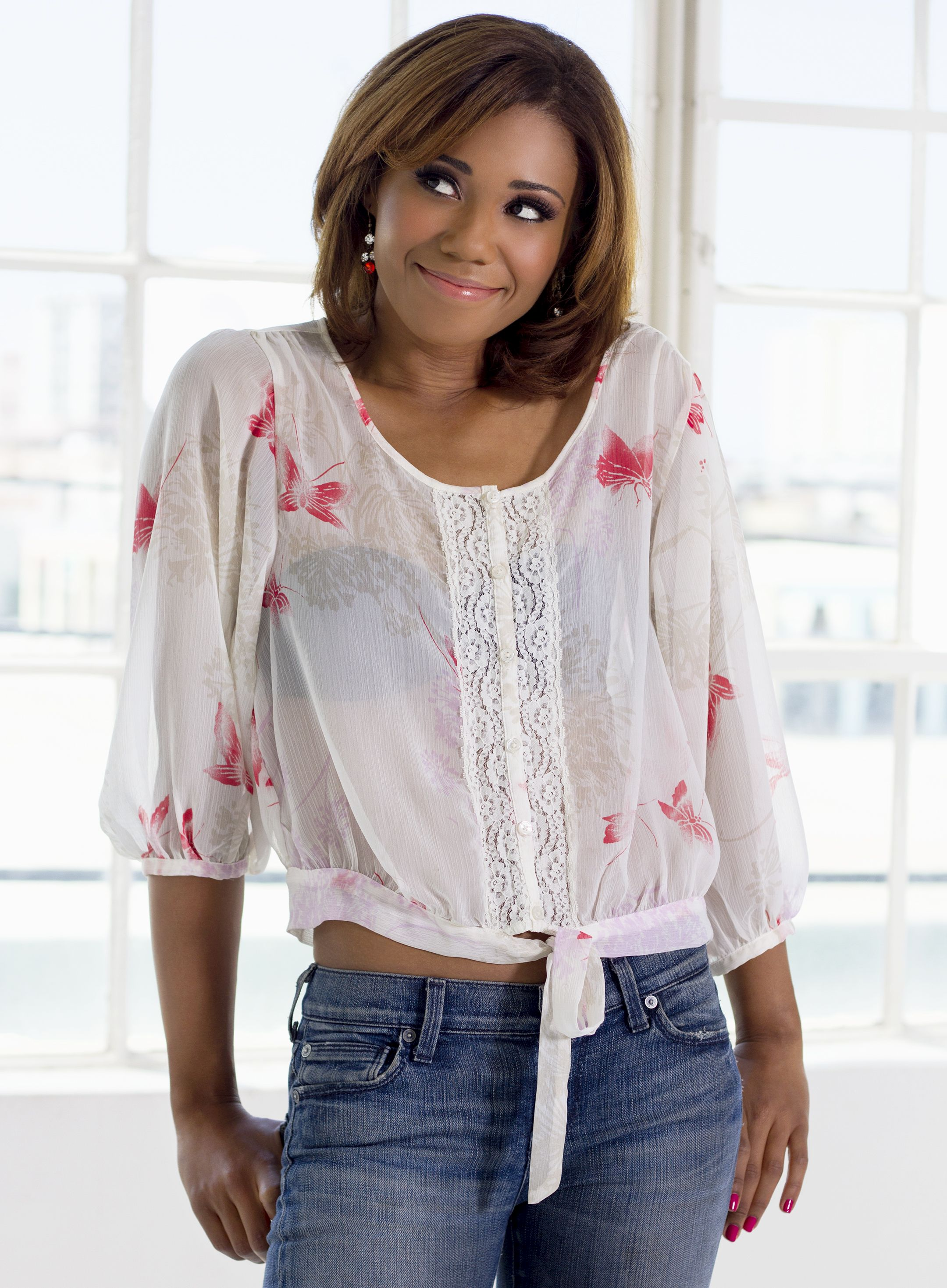
Simon Templeman (left) portrays alien leader Larry Bird. Toks Olagundoye (right) portrays Jackie Joyner-Kersee, Larry's wife.

In December 2011, Jami Gertz, Simon Templeman, Toks Olagundoye, and Tim Jo obtained roles in the series. It was announced that Gertz would play Debbie Weaver, the matriarch of the human family; Templeman would play Larry Bird, the leader of the aliens; Olagundoye was cast as Jackie Joyner Kersee, the matriarch of the lead alien family; and Jo would appear as Reggie Jackson, the son of the alien family. Larry Bird, the lead alien, was originally to be named Wilt Chamberlain.

In January 2012, Clara Mamet, Max Charles, and Isabella Cramp garnered roles in the series, Mamet as the teenage daughter and Charles and Cramp as her younger siblings. Later that month, Lenny Venito obtained the lead role as Marty Weaver, the father of the human family.

== Reception ==
=== Critical response ===
The Neighbors initially received negative treatment from critics, but gained increasing critical praise as the season aired. Writing for the San Francisco Chronicle, David Wiegand thought that it did not look "promising" as it was a high-concept show. He compared it to the NBC science fiction comedy series 3rd Rock from the Sun, claiming that the series' creator made it so different from 3rd Rock from the Sun, that it is "weird". He stated that if The Neighbors garnered low ratings, it could possibly be replaced with Family Tools, an ABC comedy that is scheduled to air in mid-season. He compared it to other comedies set to air on the same channel, writing that those are better. According to Wiegand, The Neighbors seems like Outsourced, which aired for one season on NBC.

Other reviews were somewhat more positive. Dave Walker from The Times-Picayune thought that The Neighbors was a "fish-out-of-water"; he called it a "potentially comedic" show. Rob Owen, a Pittsburgh Post-Gazette critic, claimed that he has "interest in high-concept shows"; he also "laughed a good bit at the pilot episode". His concern was "how long they can keep up the jokes. Seeing the unusual way aliens do the dishes in the pilot is hilarious. But that gag only works the first time. After that, it's stale."

=== Awards ===
Year	Award	Category	Recipient	Result	Ref.
2013	People's Choice Award	Favorite New Comedy		Nominated	
2013	Young Artist Award	Best Performance in a TV Series - Supporting Young Actor	Max Charles	Nominated	
2013	Young Artist Award	Best Performance in a TV Series - Supporting Young Actor	Ian Patrick	Nominated	
2013	Young Artist Award	Best Performance in a TV Series - Supporting Young Actress	Isabella Cramp	Nominated	
2013	Young Artist Award	Outstanding Young Ensemble in a TV Series	Max Charles, Isabella Cramp, Ian Patrick	Won	
2013	Primetime Emmy Award	Outstanding Original Music and Lyrics	Alan Menken & Glenn Slater ("More or Less the Kind of Thing You May or May Not Possibly See on Broadway")	Nominated	
2014	Young Artist Award	Best Performance in a TV Series - Supporting Young Actress	Isabella Cramp	Won	

== Broadcasts ==
The Neighbors premiered at 9:30 pm approximately on September 26, 2012, on ABC after Modern Family, before moving to its regular time slot at 8:30 p.m. after The Middle, the following week. Disney Channel aired four episodes (maybe to gain more viewers) which in fact is also owned by The Walt Disney Company.

In Canada, it originally aired on Saturday at 10:00 pm on CTV network in the fall of 2012 after the Crimetime Saturday block. It has since moved to sister network CTV Two on Wednesday nights at 8:30 p.m., allowing simsubbing over the ABC broadcast.

In Australia, The Neighbors premiered on September 28, 2013, on Seven Network. In India, The Neighbors season aired from September 24 only on Star World Premiere. In the Netherlands, Comedy Central shows and repeats the series. In Portugal, FX airs the series subtitled in Portuguese.

In Italy, the series aired on FOX under the name Vincini de terzo tipo (Neighbors of the Third Kind) in 2013.

== See also ==
- My Favorite Martian
- Mork & Mindy
- ALF
- 3rd Rock from the Sun
