= Joe Pennella =

American cinematographer and television director

- Occupation(s): Cinematographer, television director
- Years active: 1983–present

Joseph Pennella is an American cinematographer and television director.

== Career ==
Pennella's career began as a documentary filmmaker in Denver, Colorado. He is a graduate of the University of Denver and received a bachelor's degree in mass communications.

Beginning in the 1980s, Pennella worked on as a second unit director of photography on the films Bad Boys (1983) and Blueberry Hill (1988).

From 1985, he focused primarily on cinematography, working on the films Happy Together (1989) and Wife, Mother, Murderer (1991), both directed by Mel Damski. Moving to television, he worked on shows including Life Goes On, The Drew Carey Show, The Wayans Bros., Jack & Jill, Ed, Kitchen Condential, Pepper Dennis, and What About Brian.

In 1997, he made his directorial debut with an episode of Clueless. His other directing credits include Jake in Progress, Everwood and Monk, also working as a cinematographer on the latter.
