= Lenny Venito =

American actor

- Occupation: Actor
- Years active: 1988–present

Lenny Venito is an American actor, who has made appearances in films such as Gigli, Men in Black 3, and War of the Worlds. He also starred as Marty Weaver in the ABC comedy The Neighbors and James "Murmur" Zancone on The Sopranos.

== Career ==
Venito appeared in a recurring role in The Sopranos as "Murmur." He also appeared as John, an incompetent mugger, in two episodes, "Mugged" and "Wingmen", of another HBO Series, Flight of the Conchords. Venito was cast in one episode of Ugly Betty, as well as in two episodes of Bored to Death.

Venito participated in the 2008 Celebrity Poker Invitational.

Venito appeared in five episodes of NYPD Blue, most notably as Julian Pisano, a snitch with a heart of gold, a role he reprised in Blind Justice.

Venito played Detective Wade in Law & Order season 12 episode 7 "Finger Prints of Myth" and he also played Jake Nathan and Dom Fabrigazzi in Criminal Intent.

In 2007, he starred in the short-lived ABC sitcom The Knights of Prosperity as "Squatch."

From 2012 to 2014, Venito starred as Marty Weaver in the ABC comedy The Neighbors.

From 2014 to 2017, Venito voiced the recurring character Uncle Chuck on the Disney XD animated series Penn Zero: Part-Time Hero.

In 2016, Venito began co-starring in the CBS series Kevin Can Wait, portraying the role of Kevin Gable's friend Duffy.

Since 2019, he has been featured as "Uncle Cooper" in an ad campaign for Cooper Tires.

In 2022, Venito had a recurring role in Showtime's Flatbush Misdemeanors, as Franklin, Dan's Narcotics Anonymous sponsor.

== Filmography ==
=== Film ===
Year	Title	Role	Notes
1991	The Good Policeman	Joe Barbarossa	
1993	Money for Nothing	Hrbek	
1996	Layin' Low	Vince	
1998	Rounders	Moogie	
1998	Above Freezing	Kos	
1999	Just the Ticket	Stanley	
2002	Men in Black II	New York Guy	
2003	Gigli	Louis	
2004	Tony n' Tina's Wedding	Sal	
2004	Shark Tale	Giuseppe, Great White #1	Voice
2005	Duane Hopwood	Cop	
2005	The Honeymooners	Lenny	
2005	War of the Worlds	Manny the Mechanic	
2006	The Wild	Stan	Voice
2007	The Brave One	Mortelli	
2008	Return to Sleepaway Camp	Micky	Video
2009	Solitary Man	Todd The Building Manager	
2010	How Do You Know	Al	
2012	Men in Black 3	Bowling Ball Head	
2014	God's Pocket	Little Eddie	
2014	St. Vincent	Coach Mitchell	
2016	Money Monster	Lenny the cameraman	
2018	Who's Jenna...?	Dominick Grillo	
2021	This Is the Night	Carmine Cacioppo	

=== Television ===
Year	Title	Role	Notes
1988	The Equalizer	Devin	Episode: "Target of Choice"
1992	Here and Now	Bo	Episode: "A.J.'s Big Leap"
1995	The Cosby Mysteries	Ears	Episode: "Bakers Dozen"
1996	New York Undercover	Officer Zanfagna	Episode: "Unis"
1997–2001	NYPD Blue	Julian Pisano	6 episodes
1998	Witness to the Mob	Sal DiMaggio	Television movie
1998	Living in Captivity	Carmine Santucci	8 episodes
2001	Law & Order	Detective Wade	Episode: "Myth of Fingerprints"
2001	Law & Order: Criminal Intent	Jake Nathan	Episode: "One"
2002	The Mayor of Oyster Bay		Television movie
2002	The Job	Ozzie	Episode "Boss"
2003	Queens Supreme	Mr. Riordan	2 episodes
2003	Third Watch		Episode: "Everybody Lies"
2003	Hack		Episode: "Out of the Ashes"
2004	Law & Order	Sonny King	Episode: "Everybody Loves Raimondo's"
2004	The Practice	Eddie	Episode: "Adjourned/Cheers"
2004	The Jury	Detective Temson	2 episodes
2005	Blind Justice	Sonny Famigletti, Julian Pisano	2 episodes
2006	Rescue Me	Prison Guard	3 episodes
2006–2007	The Sopranos	James "Murmur" Zancone	9 episodes
2007	Law & Order: Special Victims Unit	Terry Donovan	Episode: "Fight"
2007	The Knights of Prosperity	Francis "Squatch" Squacieri	13 episodes
2007–2009	Flight of the Conchords	John	2 episodes
2008	Life on Mars	Nick Profaci	3 episodes
2008	Ugly Betty	Phil	Episode: "Tornado Girl"
2010	Gravity	Drunk #1	Episode: "Dogg Day Afternoon"
2010	Law & Order: Criminal Intent	Dominic "Dom" Fabrigazzi Jr.	Episode: "The Mobster Will See You Now"
2010–2011	Bored to Death	Officer Drake	3 episodes
2011	Lights Out	Officer Velez	2 episodes
2011	Curb Your Enthusiasm	One armed Man	Episode: "Car Periscope"
2011	Unforgettable	Detective Stan Moyer	Episode: "With Honor"
2012	Person of Interest	Murray Langston	Episode: "Matsya Nyaya"
2012	NYC 22	Detective Mascis	3 episodes
2012	Law & Order: Special Victims Unit	Ray Gabardelli	Episode: "Learning Curve"
2012–2014	The Neighbors	Marty Weaver	44 episodes
2014	The Good Wife	Sheriff Gibson	2 episodes
2014	Law & Order: Special Victims Unit	John Gatto	Episode: "Girls Disappeared"
2014–2017	Penn Zero: Part-Time Hero	Uncle Chuck	Voice, 8 episodes
2015	Blue Bloods	Detective Louis Weems	Episode: "The Poor Door"
2015	Benders		Episode: "Choke"
2016	The Odd Couple	Frank	Episode: "All About Eavesdropping"
2016–2017	Kevin Can Wait	Duffy	Main role, 24 episodes
2017	Billions	Slayton	Episode #2.11
2017	The Blacklist	The Mailman/Tony Pagliaro	3 episodes
2018	FBI	Lee Shalgos	Episode: "Green Birds"
2019	Law & Order: Special Victims Unit	Detective Monte	Episode: "Murdered at a Bad Address"
2019	Unbreakable Kimmy Schmidt	Rocco Scarpone	Episode: "Sliding Van Doors"
2019	The Marvelous Mrs. Maisel	Angie Calibresi	2 episodes
2025	Ghosts	Anthony	Episode: "Ghostfellas"

=== Video games ===
Year	Title	Role	Notes
2003	Manhunt	Hoods	
