= Isabella Crovetti =

American actress (born 2004)

- Born: Isabella Veneranda-Patricia Cramp; December 18, 2004 (age 21)
- Other names: Isabella Cramp; Isabella Crovetti-Cramp
- Occupation: Actress
- Years active: 2010–present
- Relatives: Cameron Crovetti (brother)

Isabella Veneranda-Patricia Cramp (born December 18, 2004), known professionally as Isabella Cramp, Isabella Crovetti-Cramp or Isabella Crovetti at various points in her career, is an American actress and voice actress.

== Career ==
Crovetti began her acting career at age five, when she started playing small roles on television and in commercials. She has acted in several television series since then, most notably her role as Abby Weaver in ABC's sitcom, The Neighbors (2012–2014). She voiced Shine in the Nick Jr. Channel program, Shimmer and Shine, which premiered in August 2015. Crovetti played young Joy in the 2015 film Joy.

== Filmography ==
=== Television ===
Year	Title	Role	Notes
2011	Mike & Molly	Cindy	Episode: "Christmas Break"
2011	Enlightened	Young Amy	Episode: "Consider Helen"
2011	The Young and the Restless	Young Avery	Episode: "Lily Convinces Cane to Visit Genevieve"
2011	CSI: Miami	Young Jan Gramercy	Episode: "Crowned"
2011	Family Album	Ruby Bronsky	Unsold TV pilot
2011	Possessing Piper Rose	Piper Maxwell	Television film
2011–2012	Happy Endings	Young Alex	Episodes: "Why Can't You Read Me?", "KickBall 2: The Kickening"
2012	In Plain Sight	Young Mary	Episode: "The Medal of Mary"
2012–2014	The Neighbors	Abby Weaver	Main role
2013	It's Always Sunny in Philadelphia	Sarah	Episode: "The Gang Saves the Day"
2014	Jessie	Wendy McMillan	Episode: "Snack Attack"
2015	Mutt & Stuff	Genie	Episode: "I Bark of Genie"
2015–2020	Shimmer and Shine	Shine	Main voice role
2016	Secrets and Lies	Rachel Voss	Episode: "The Racket"
2016–2018	Colony	Gracie Bowman	Main role
2016	Scorpion	Olivia Pearson	Episode: "Ticker"
2017	Whisker Haven	Ash	Voice role; 3 episodes
2017–2021	Vampirina	Vampirina "Vee" Hauntley	Lead voice role
2023	SuperKitties	Zsa Zsa	Voice role; Recurring role
2024	That Girl Lay Lay	Kay Kay	Episode: "Out the App 2: E-Lay-Lay-tric Boogaloo"
2025	A Star Brighter Than the Sun	Sae Iwata	Lead voice role; English dub

=== Film ===
Year	Title	Role	Notes
2015	Joy	Young Joy	Film
2020	Magic Camp	Ruth	Streaming film
2021	He's All That	Brin Kweller	Streaming film

=== Video games ===
Year	Title	Role	Notes	Source
2022	Stranger of Paradise: Final Fantasy Origin	Mia	Voice role	

== Awards and nominations ==
Year	Award	Category	Work	Result	Ref.
2013	Young Artist Award	Best Performance in a TV Series - Supporting Young Actress	The Neighbors	Nominated	
2013	Young Artist Award	Outstanding Young Ensemble in a TV Series	The Neighbors	Won	
2014	Young Artist Award	Best Performance in a TV Series - Supporting Young Actress	The Neighbors	Won	
