= Chris Koch (director) =

American film and television director

- Born: Melrose, Massachusetts
- Occupations: Film director, television director
- Years active: 1993–present

Christopher Koch is an American director of film and television.

He is known for directing the films Snow Day (2000), his feature directorial debut, and A Guy Thing (2003).

Koch's television credits include The Adventures of Pete & Pete, Malcolm in the Middle, Scrubs, My Name Is Earl, Better Off Ted, Cougar Town, Workaholics, The Middle, Modern Family, The Neighbors, Young Sheldon, A Million Little Things, American Housewife, Ordinary Joe, Reboot, Young Rock, Not Dead Yet, Animal Control, This is Us, Only Murders in the Building and the legendary British live-action Nickelodeon 1998 short-form series Race Rabbit.

In addition, Koch is the co-owner of the production company KONK, which he co-created with film producer David Kerwin.
