= Dan Fogelman =

American screenwriter and producer

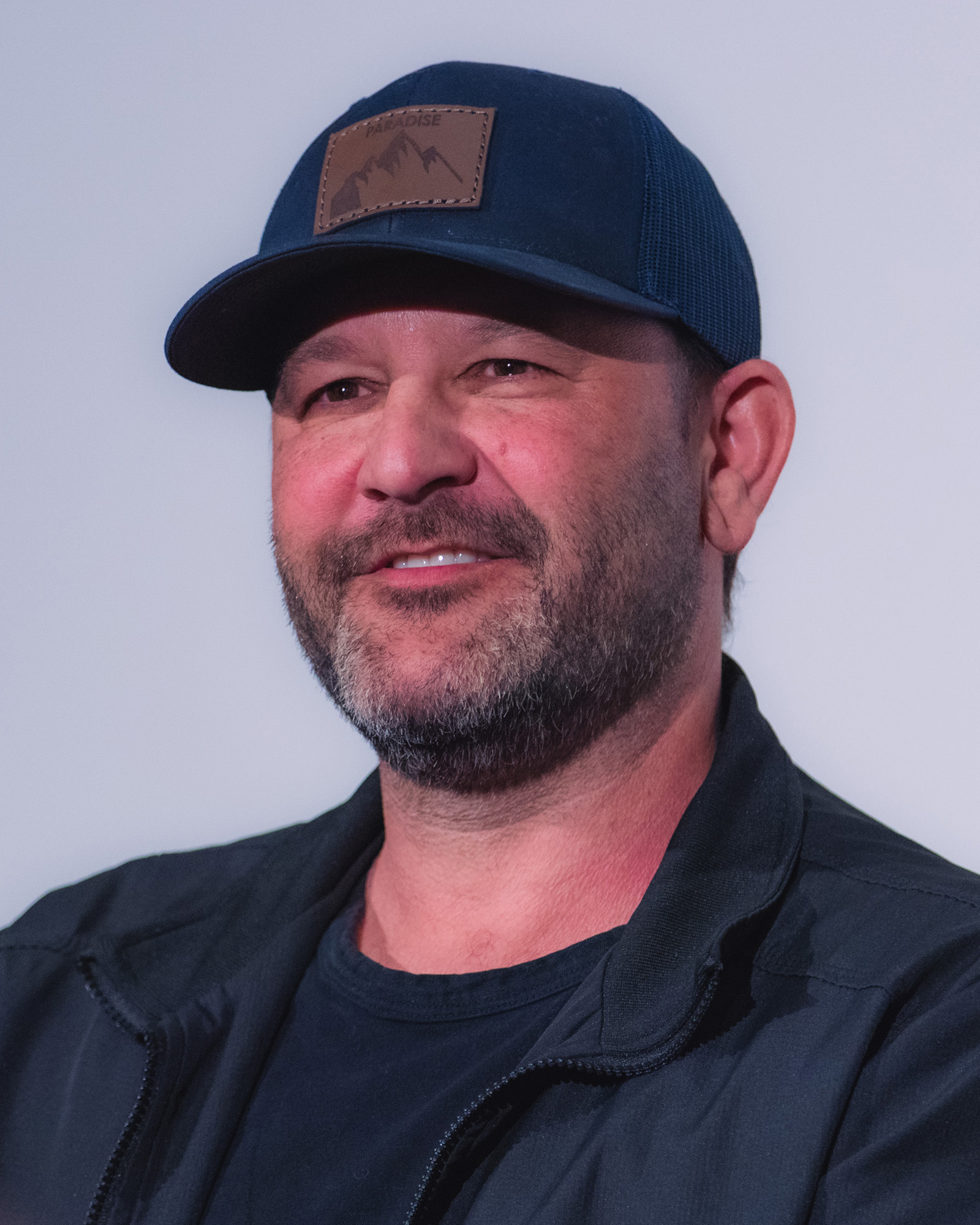
- Fogelman in 2026
- Born: River Vale, New Jersey, U.S.
- Education: University of Pennsylvania
- Occupations: screenwriter, film director, producer
- Known for: Cars; Bolt; Tangled; Crazy, Stupid, Love; This Is Us; Only Murders in the Building; Last Vegas
- Spouse: Caitlin Thompson (m. 2015)
- Children: 1

Dan Fogelman is an American filmmaker, whose screenplays include the movies Cars (2006), Bolt (2008), Tangled (2010), Crazy, Stupid, Love (2011) and Last Vegas (2013). He also created the 2012 television sitcom The Neighbors, the 2015 fairy tale-themed musical comedy series Galavant, the 2016 drama series This Is Us, the 2016 baseball drama series Pitch, and the 2025 drama series Paradise.

== Biography ==
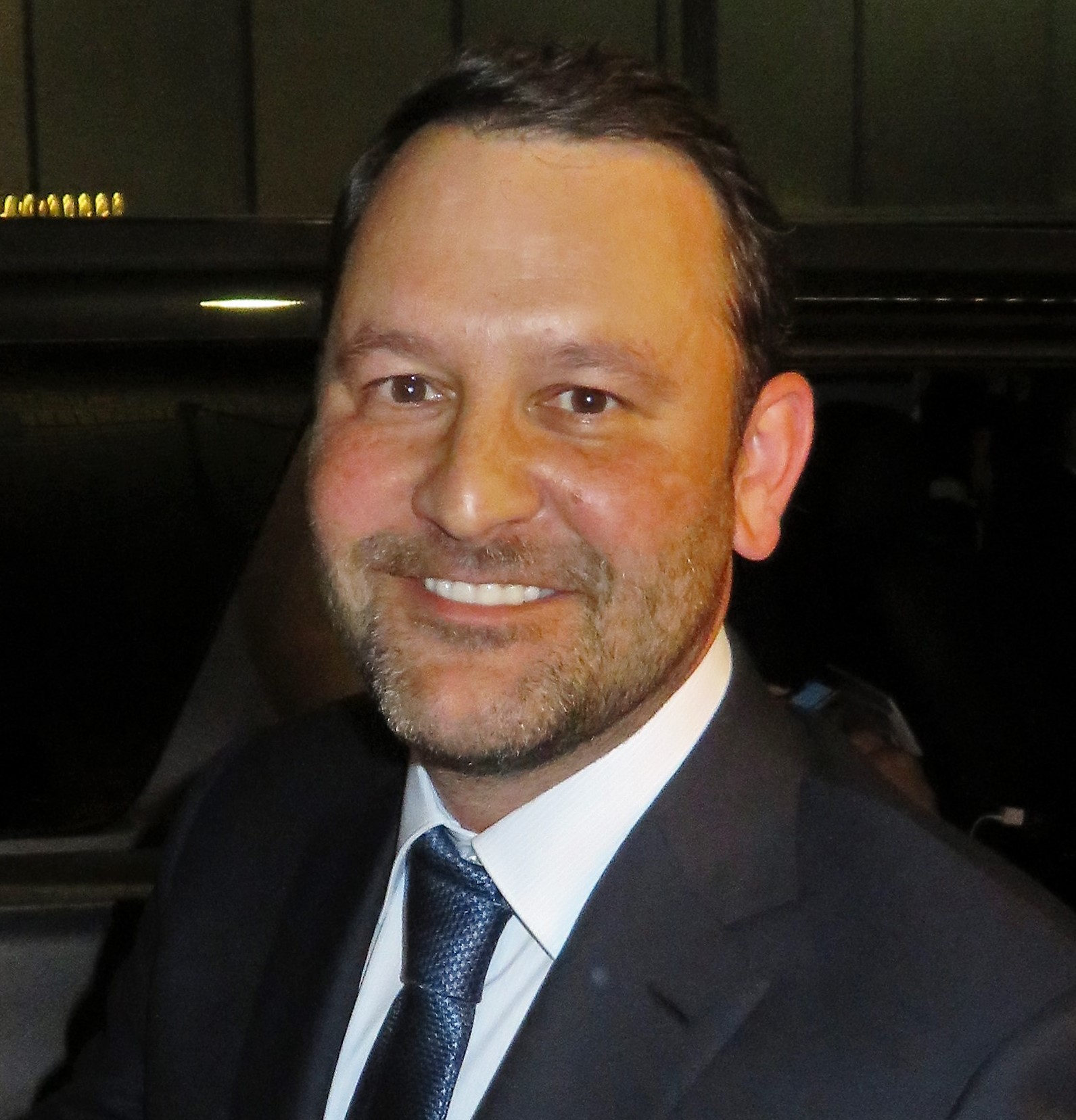
Fogelman at the premiere of Life Itself, 2018 Toronto International Film Festival

Fogelman grew up in what he has called an "endearingly dysfunctional" Jewish family in River Vale, New Jersey. He attended Pascack Valley High School in nearby Hillsdale. He attended the University of Pennsylvania and graduated in 1997. He and his mother, Joyce, took a road trip from New Jersey to Las Vegas that became the basis for his 2012 film comedy The Guilt Trip, starring Barbra Streisand and Seth Rogen as a mother and son on a cross-country road trip. His father, named Marty, became the namesake of the father in the 2012 television sitcom The Neighbors created by Fogelman, who has a sister who inspired the family daughter in this series.

=== Personal life ===
He is married to Caitlin Thompson, who stars as Madison on his family drama This Is Us. They have a son, born in 2020.

== Filmography ==
=== Films ===
Title	Year	Director	Writer	Producer	Notes
Shit Happens	2003	Yes	Yes	No	Short film
Cars	2006	No	Yes	No	Co-written with John Lasseter, Joe Ranft, Kiel Murray, Phil Lorin and Jorgen Klubien
Fred Claus	2007	No	Yes	No	
Bolt	2008	No	Yes	No	Co-written with Chris Williams; Voice role: Billy
Tangled	2010	No	Yes	No	
Cars 2	2011	No	Story	No	Story co-written with John Lasseter and Brad Lewis
Crazy, Stupid, Love	2011	No	Yes	No	
The Guilt Trip	2012	No	Yes	Executive	
Last Vegas	2013	No	Yes	No	
Me and Earl and the Dying Girl	2015	No	No	Yes	
Danny Collins	2015	Yes	Yes	No	Directorial debut
Life Itself	2018	Yes	Yes	Yes	
Honeymoon with Harry	TBA	No	Yes	Yes	Filming

Also uncredited wrote an earlier draft for Indiana Jones and the Dial of Destiny (2023).

=== Television films ===
Title	Year	Writer	Executive Producer	Notes
The 12th Man	2006	Yes	Yes	
Lipshitz Saves the World	2007	Yes	Yes	Unsold pilot
Untitled NBA Project	2015	No	Yes	
The King of 7B	2015	Yes	Yes	

=== Television series ===
Title	Year(s)	Writer	Executive Producer	Creator	Notes
Like Family	2003–2004	Yes	Yes	Yes	Creator and executive producer (23 episodes) / Writer (Episode: ''Pilot'')
The Neighbors	2012–2014	Yes	Yes	Yes	Creator and executive producer (44 episodes) / Writer (8 episodes)
Galavant	2015–2016	Yes	Yes	Yes	Creator and executive producer (18 episodes) / Writer (4 episodes)
Grandfathered	2015–2016	Yes	Yes	No	Writer (2 episodes) / Executive producer (22 episodes)
Pitch	2016	Yes	Yes	Yes	Creator and executive producer (10 episodes) / Writer (3 episodes)
This Is Us	2016–2022	Yes	Yes	Yes	Creator and executive producer (106 episodes) / Writer (19 episodes)
Only Murders in the Building	2021–present	No	Yes	No	50 episodes
Paradise	2025–present	Yes	Yes	Yes	Creator and executive producer/ Writer (3 episodes)
The Land	TBA	Yes	Yes	Yes	Creator and executive producer

== Accolades ==
Primetime Emmys
Category	Role	Work	Year	Result	Ref.
Outstanding Drama Series	Executive producer	This Is Us	2017	Nominated	
Outstanding Drama Series	Executive producer	This Is Us	2018	Nominated	
Outstanding Drama Series	Executive producer	This Is Us	2019	Nominated	
Outstanding Drama Series	Executive producer	This Is Us	2021	Nominated	
Outstanding Comedy Series	Executive producer	Only Murders in the Building	2022	Nominated	
Outstanding Comedy Series	Executive producer	Only Murders in the Building	2023	Nominated	
Outstanding Comedy Series	Executive producer	Only Murders in the Building	2024	Nominated	
Outstanding Comedy Series	Executive producer	Only Murders in the Building	2025	Nominated	
Outstanding Drama Series	Executive producer	Paradise	2025	Nominated	
