= Reefer Madness (musical) =

Stage musical satire of the 1936 film of the same name

- Logo
- Music: Dan Studney
- Lyrics: Kevin Murphy
- Book: Kevin Murphy
- Basis: Reefer Madness by Arthur Hoerl; Lawrence Meade
- Premiere: 1998
- Productions: 1998 Los Angeles; 2001 Off-Broadway; 2004 St. Louis; 2006 Long Island; 2008 Australian Premiere; 2013 Australia; 2024 Los Angeles Revival

Reefer Madness is a musical satire of the 1936 cult classic propaganda film of the same name. With book and lyrics by Kevin Murphy and book and music by Dan Studney, the musical debuted in Los Angeles in 1998.

== Productions ==
Directed by Andy Fickman, it was initially shown at the Hudson Theater on Santa Monica Boulevard in Los Angeles. The Off-Broadway production ran from September 15 to October 28, 2001, at the Variety Arts Theatre. Rodgers and Hammerstein Theatricals now administers the stock/amateur rights, and the show has been produced by local theater groups in several cities, including Long Island, Toronto, Seattle, Philadelphia, Charleston, Sacramento, Raleigh, Norfolk, Minneapolis, and London. The 2008 production at the Studio Theater in Washington, D.C. won two Helen Hayes Awards, for directing and outstanding Resident Production.

An all-star benefit concert version of the musical was presented at New World Stages on April 20, 2014, featuring Alan Cumming, Christian Campbell, Thomas Dekker, Andrea McArdle, Lesli Margherita, James Snyder, Harry S. Murphy, John Kassir, Amy Spanger, Jenna Leigh Green, and Lea Delaria. Directed by Ilana Ransom Toeplitz and produced by Shoshana Feinstein, it was a benefit for the BabyQuest Foundation.

A 25th anniversary revival was staged in Los Angeles, directed and choreographed by Spencer Liff, and produced by Christian Campbell, Alan Cumming, Kristen Bell, Andy Fickman, Dan Studney, Kevin Murphy, and America Olivo Campbell. The production team included Maia Falconi-Sachs, Matthew Rosenthal, and Nick Padgett as co-producers, and original cast member Wendy Parker as executive producer. The LA revival opened May 30, 2024, and received all around rave reviews; due to popular demand, the production was extended beyond its planned 8-week-run. Due to multiple cases of COVID-19 in the cast, Bell filled in for Darcy Rose Byrnes as Mary for two performances on August 10 and 11, reprising the role for the first time in twenty years.

=== International productions ===
The Canadian premiere was produced by Hart House Theatre in September 2006 with both Kevin Murphy and Dan Studney in attendance. The show returned to Canada during The Lower Ossington Theatre's Toronto production, June 9–18, 2011.

The Squabblogic production was mounted as the Australian premiere, opening July 24, 2008 at Cleveland Street Theatre in Sydney, running for four weeks. This small, boutique production starred Australian TV legend Barry Crocker as The Lecturer, Brad Facey as Jimmy, and Jess Burns as Mary Lane.

The UK premiere was staged at the Bridewell Theatre in London, opening March 24, 2009.

== Synopsis ==
This synopsis reflects the current version of the show as licensed. For information about other versions of the show, and cut songs, see below.

=== Act I ===
The year is 1936. As the play opens, the Lecturer, a stern, conservative authority figure, informs a group of parents (the audience) of the new drug menace, "marihuana", which threatens the American way of life. (His warnings are reinforced by the Placard Girl, who throughout the play holds up large signs that clearly state scenes' moral lessons.) From his podium, the Lecturer warns the audience that action must be taken immediately before the children of America succumb to the Demon Weed ("Reefer Madness"). The Lecturer illustrates his point by re-enacting "the Harper Affair", which he claims is a true and horrific scandal. He begins by introducing us to Jimmy Harper and Mary Lane, a lovable pair of wholesome teens who hold hands, sip hot cocoa, and think pure thoughts while studying Shakespeare for English class ("Romeo and Juliet").

The Lecturer then shows us the seamier side of life at the Reefer Den, populated by drug-addled denizens. We meet Mae, the Reefer Den hostess, who is abused by her slick, pusher boyfriend Jack. She'd leave him, but Jack keeps her supplied with the marijuana she craves ("The Stuff"), despite his physical and sexual abuse.

The Lecturer brings us now to the five and dime, a local teen hangout where wholesome kids indulge in the risqué rhythms of swing-jazz music, as performed by Duke Ellington, Dizzy Gillespie, and other "ginger-colored agents of evil" ("Down at the Ol' Five and Dime"). The Lecturer assumes the guise of kindly Mr. Poppy, the singing and dancing proprietor.

Jack, trawling for youthful victims, arrives at the five and dime, where he meets Jimmy and lures him back to the Reefer Den under the pretense of offering him swing dancing lessons. There, Jimmy encounters Ralph, a psychotic ex-college student who communicates primarily with cackling, maniacal laughter. He also meets Sally, a marijuana-addicted prostitute who works to support herself and her baby. Jimmy is pressured into taking his first hit of marijuana ("Jimmy Takes a Hit") and tastes the forbidden fruits of sensual abandon in a wild hallucinatory dance sequence featuring weird sex, belly dancers, fire eaters, and Goat-Man, a frightening satyr played by the Lecturer ("The Orgy").

Over the next few weeks, we watch Jimmy make a terrifying transition from "good egg" to "bad apple". He mouths off to his parents, brutalizes a puppy, and even attempts to tongue-kiss a shocked Mary, sending her running off in tears. Alone in church, Mary prays that her sweetheart will regain his senses and return to her ("Lonely Pew").

Later, Jimmy and Ralph break into the church to steal from the poor box. While Ralph goes off to smoke some frankincense, Jimmy receives a vision of Jesus Christ! Jesus (played by Jack) warns Jimmy (in a Tom Jones-style production number) to kick his reefer habit or suffer eternal damnation ("Listen to Jesus, Jimmy"), but Jimmy ultimately refuses to heed Jesus's warning.

Back at the Reefer Den, Jimmy is completely out of control. A desperate Mae warns Jimmy to avoid her own mistakes – he must escape the Reefer Den while he is still able. The drug-addled Jimmy won't listen. Even the revelation that Sally has sold her baby for drug money fails to snap him out of it. Sally's baby (played by Ralph) appears and sings a plaintive solo ("Lullaby").

Jimmy's misbehavior culminates with his stealing Mary's Packard and taking it for a reckless, marijuana-induced joyride with Sally. His joy, however, proves short-lived – Sally, who is driving, runs over a helpless old man crossing the street, killing him.

Finally regaining his senses, Jimmy returns the stolen Packard to Mary's house and apologizes to her, pledging his love ("Mary Jane/Mary Lane".) Before he can give her his school ring as a token of his undying love, a siren sounds in the distance. Jimmy, now wanted for a hit-and-run, realizes that he must get far away from Mary lest he bring her down with him. He runs off into the night with no explanation. Mary doesn't know the exact nature of Jimmy's demons, but she vows he will not face them alone. She drives her Packard into the night in search of "her poor lost Romeo".

Meanwhile, back at the Reefer Den, Jack and Mae hear a radio broadcast announcing the hit-and-run accident. Police are looking for a young man in a late-model Packard. Jack, fearing Jimmy will be arrested and lead the cops back to him, grabs a pistol and ominously vows to bring Jimmy back to the Reefer Den "one way or another" ("Act I Finale").

=== Act II ===
As the act begins, hallucinatory visions of Ralph, Sally and Mae appear as Jazz Trio Backup Girls ("Jimmy on the Lam"). The Lecturer brings us up to date – Jimmy's on the lam and Mary's "combing the rain-spattered streets in search of her wayward young man." Jimmy arrives at the local train station and attempts to purchase a one-way ticket for "Parts Unknown".

Before Jimmy can board the train, Jack appears and tries to convince Jimmy to return to the Reefer Den with him. Jimmy refuses; he promised himself he'd never smoke marijuana again. Jack tricks Jimmy by offering him a seemingly innocent brownie. Jimmy thinks this is the best brownie he's ever eaten in his life. The train station patrons join him in a song extolling the many virtues of said brownie ("The Brownie Song"). Jimmy is hooked once again.

Meanwhile, Mary makes inquiries at the five and dime. Kindly Mr. Poppy provides Mary with the address of the Reefer Den. The naive Mary leaves, grateful for Mr. Poppy's assistance. As soon as Mary is out of earshot, Mr. Poppy telephones the Reefer Den and tells Ralph to inform Jack that an unsuspecting new "client" is on her way over. We learn that Mr. Poppy is secretly on Jack's payroll. He helps Jack "trundle little children off to pay the wages of sin" ("Five and Dime" reprise).

Back at the Reefer Den, Sally drags Jimmy upstairs for a weed-whacked sexual liaison. When Mary arrives looking for Jimmy, the lecherous Ralph is lying in wait. He tries to seduce Mary by tricking her into smoking marijuana herself ("Little Mary Sunshine"). The plan backfires – the power of the weed is so great, it immediately transforms the virginal Mary into a whip-cracking sadomasochist who enslaves the frightened Ralph. Upon discovering Mary and Ralph in a compromising position, a smoke-addled Jimmy attacks Ralph. A scuffle ensues. Jimmy is knocked unconscious and Jack accidentally shoots Mary through the heart. The villainous Jack places the gun in the unconscious Jimmy's hand. Jimmy, who remembers nothing, is convinced that he has murdered his beloved "Juliet". Mary regains consciousness long enough for Jimmy to finally give her his school ring. She dies in his arms ("Mary's Death").

As the police pull up in front of the house, Mae tells Jimmy that he's innocent of the crime and that Jack is planning to frame him. A police inspector (played by the Lecturer) bursts in. Jack accuses Jimmy of murdering Mary while "hopped up" on reefer. Jimmy begs Mae to tell the truth and exonerate him. Mae, however, is too weak and too dependent on the "stuff" Jack gives her. She remains silent and Jimmy is dragged away to stand trial.

A few weeks later. Ralph, Mae, and Sally are racked with guilt as they listen to Winchell announce Jimmy Harper's conviction and death sentence. Ralph, who has been smoking non-stop, is becoming seriously unhinged. He sees hallucinatory visions: the ghost of doomed Jimmy, dead Mary in Hell being sodomized by the Devil, and the zombie remnants of all the kids destroyed by reefer. Imaginary reefer vines drop from the ceiling, ensnaring him. All the while, Ralph, stricken with a severe case of the munchies, moans about starving to death. Fearing that Ralph's insane caterwauling will prompt a neighbor to call the cops, Jack and Mae leave to get Ralph something to eat. Sally is instructed to remain behind and keep Ralph quiet. When Jack and Mae return with Chinese food, they catch Ralph in the act of gnawing on Sally's severed arm – he has eaten Sally alive! Ralph, now a cackling reefer-fueled cannibal, turns on Mae and Jack. Jack shoots Ralph repeatedly. He dies laughing. The shock of all this causes Mae's mind to snap – she's surrounded by the angry visions of Ralph, Sally, Mary, Goat-Man, Jimmy, and the Zombies ("Murder!"). Jack warns the unhinged Mae that the world is kill or be killed; "the winner is the last one left alive."

Mae decides the only way to find inner peace is to turn herself in and save Jimmy from the electric chair. Jack tries to bring Mae back to her senses in his usual fashion – by giving her a smoke. Mae stubs it out. An angry Jack slaps her for wasting "half a jay of good mootah". Mae reacts with cold fury and picks up a hoe from the victory garden. Frightened by Mae's intensity, Jack tries to shoot her – alas, he expended all his bullets on Ralph! Mae sings as she slashes Jack with the garden hoe, avenging the deaths of Sally, Ralph, Mary, and every other poor kid Jack has ever hooked on marijuana ("The Stuff" reprise). Fountains of blood spray over the stage. Finally, Mae runs off to save Jimmy.

Meanwhile, in an execution chamber, Jimmy walks the last mile and is strapped into the electric chair. Just as the Switch-Puller (played by Ralph) prepares to fry Jimmy, he is interrupted by a second visit from Jesus and his backup angels! They sing and dance ("Listen to Jesus, Jimmy" reprise). Jimmy's immense relief is short-lived. It turns out Jesus has only come to gloat and watch the execution. Jimmy prepares to meet his fate – when a second interruption occurs.

This time it is Mae who has obtained a presidential pardon. President FDR (played by the Lecturer) orders Jimmy to warn other children to beware the dangers of reefer. The President promises Jimmy plenty of help getting the message out. The government will use the power of radio, the papers of William Randolph Hearst, and powerful iconography: Uncle Sam, George Washington, and Lady Liberty (played by Ralph, Jack and Sally respectively). That Patriotic Trio joins the group in a rousing production number, chock-full of American iconography ("Tell 'Em the Truth"). During the song, Jimmy leads the townspeople back to the Reefer Den and builds a gigantic bonfire to immolate bales of marijuana and other "dangerous items". Mary appears dressed as an angel, freed from Hell by Jimmy's heroic destruction of property, and ascends to heaven while vowing to wait in Heaven for Jimmy until his death. The crowd sings:

And once the reefer has been destroyed
We'll start on Darwin and Sigmund Freud
And sex depicted on celluloid
And communists and queens!

The triumphant Lecturer comments:

When danger's near
Exploit their fear -
The end will justify the means!

("The Truth" Reprise)

== Musical numbers ==
=== Act I ===
1. "Reefer Madness" – Lecturer and Company
2. "Romeo and Juliet" – Jimmy and Mary
3. "The Stuff" – Mae
4. "Down at the Ol' Five and Dime" – Company
5. "Jimmy Takes a Hit/The Orgy" – Jimmy, Sally, Goat-Man, Jack, Mae and Ralph
6. "Lonely Pew" – Mary (Not in the Original L.A. Recording.)
7. "Listen to Jesus, Jimmy" – Jesus and Company
8. "Lullaby" – Sally's baby
9. "Mary Jane/Mary Lane" – Jimmy and Mary (Not in the Original L.A Recording.)
10. "Act I Finale" – Mary, Lecturer, Jack, and Company

=== Act II ===
1. "Jimmy on the Lam" – Jazz Trio Backup Girls
2. "The Brownie Song" – Jimmy
3. "Down at the Ol' Five and Dime (Reprise)" – Mr. Poppy
4. "Little Mary Sunshine" – Ralph and Mary
5. "Mary's Death" – Mary and Jimmy
6. "Murder!" – Ralph, Mae, Sally, Mary, Goat-Man, Jimmy, and Zombies
7. "The Stuff (Reprise)" – Mae
8. "Listen to Jesus, Jimmy (Reprise)" – Jesus and Company
9. "Tell 'Em the Truth" – FDR, Jimmy, Mae, Uncle Sam, George Washington, and Lady Liberty
10. "The Truth (Reprise)" – Company

=== Cut songs ===
Several songs were cut out of the show during its varying incarnations, though they have appeared on the original cast recording. They include:

- "We Know Best" – Jimmy's parents (played by the Lecturer and Mae) lecture him on the dangers of marijuana, using racially tinged examples from papers owned by William Randolph Hearst and praising the newspaperman. They then gather neighbors and other adults together to give Jimmy a dose of corporal punishment so he will remember not to think for himself. Cut two weeks into the original run in Los Angeles.
- "The Monkey Song" – Jimmy, alone on the streets, suffering from withdrawal, has a hallucination where he boxes the literal Monkey on his Back (his addiction) in a match refereed by Sally. Cut towards the end of the LA Run when the show was substantially rewritten in preparation for its move to New York and replaced with "The Brownie Song."
- "The Trial" – Jimmy's trial, where he is condemned by both the Prosecution (the Lecturer) and the Defense (Ralph) for his "Reefer Madness" and sentenced to death by the Judge (Jack). Cut towards the end of the LA Run when the show was substantially rewritten in preparation for its move to New York.
- "Dead Old Man" – Jimmy mourns the Old Man he has run down with Mary's Packard. Cut from the film version of the show, and replaced by "Mary Jane/Mary Lane" both there and in the licensing script.
- a finale reprise of "Reefer Madness" in which all the dead characters, (the entire cast, barring the Lecturer) rise from the grave and recite ridiculous morals about how Reefer has ruined them. Cut for the film version.

== Development ==
In 1998, writing partners Kevin Murphy and Dan Studney, who had met while studying at Drew University in Madison, New Jersey, were driving from Oakland to Los Angeles and listening to Frank Zappa's "Joe's Garage", when they began discussing how one might stage the piece. "So I started picturing it in my head," Studney recalled. "Frank Zappa's concept of a musical and then it just hit me. I turned to Kevin and said 'What about doing Reefer Madness as a musical?'" By the time duo reached Los Angeles, they had already written the first song.

Upon completion of the script, they approached award-winning director Andy Fickman, who accepted the project with great enthusiasm. "I was a big fan of the original movie, it always made me laugh," Fickman explained. "Then I listened to Dan and Kevin warbling away on the demo track, which didn't made me laugh, it made me cry. But the music was great and I thought, 'God, if real singers were singing that.' And then when I read the script, I fell in love with it."

The play opened in a small equity waiver theater in Los Angeles for what the producers thought might be a two-week run. Instead, it played to packed houses for over a year and a half, captivating audiences and critics alike, winning 20 theater awards and breaking records. Many devoted fans came back time and again, dressed in costumes and shouting out the lines.

Near the end of the original Los Angeles run, a number of major changes to the show were made:

- Mary's ballad, "Lonely Pew", was added to the first act.
- The Lecturer was given a bump-and-grind pole dance reprise of "Five and Dime".
- "The Trial" was deleted.
- Mary's dying moments triggered a sad reprise of "Romeo and Juliet" for the lovers.
- A long Act Two book scene in which Sally and Ralph are killed was musicalized into the up-tempo ensemble number "Murder!"
- The show's ending, in which Jimmy is electrocuted and Mae jumps out a window when she is unable to save him, followed by a scene where all the dead characters recite ridiculous-but-real quotes, was cut and replaced with the ending as described above.
- "The Orgy" was revamped with new choreography by Paula Abdul.

Soon afterward, the Los Angeles production shuttered in preparation for the move to Off-Broadway. At that point, Murphy and Studney made some additional changes to the text. The major ones were:

- "The Monkey Song", wherein a hallucinatory vision of Sally judges a boxing match between Jimmy and the literal monkey on his back, was replaced with "The Brownie Song".
- A solo counterpoint by Jack was added to the "Act One Finale" to heighten the tension at the first-act break.
- The Act Two opening "Jimmy on the Lam" was given a conceptual overhaul which added Ralph, Mae, and Sally as a jazz backup trio and set up "The Brownie Song".
- The muezzin duet in "The Orgy" was cut, due to the lack of performers who could sing that high.
- The ending of the “Jesus (Reprise)” was changed to provide a better applause button.
- The Lecturer's pole dance number was cut in New York previews, due to the absence of a pole.

Murphy and Studney adapted the musical for a film of the same name. Their screenplay made several adjustments to the plot and the score, including:

- Lyric revisions in existing songs "Five & Dime", "Orgy", "Murder", and "Tell ‘Em the Truth".
- Mr. Poppy at the Five & Dime became Miss Poppy, creating a role for Neve Campbell.
- The muezzin duet returned to "The Orgy".
- "Dead Old Man" was replaced with "Mary Jane/Mary Lane", because Kevin & Dan felt the former was a visually static solo, the kind of number that works better on stage than on film.
- "Act One Finale" and "Jimmy On the Lam" were removed, since there was no need to break the action for intermission.
- The reprise of "Listen to Jesus" was deleted (to keep things moving).
- In the stage version, the reprise of "Reefer Madness" has different lyrics. In the movie, the end credit reprise of the title song has a different arrangement, but uses the same lyrics as earlier in the film.

After the movie was released, Murphy and Studney proved unable to resist the temptation to fiddle with the show one more time. The major changes from the NYC stage version were:

- Many plot and lyric revisions made for the movie were retroactively written into the stage show. These changes include Sally driving the car that kills the old man, a happy ending (of sorts) for Mae and Jimmy, Mary's ascension to heaven, Ralph joining Jimmy for the church break-in scene, and the bonfire sequence.
- Five and Dime proprietor Mr. Poppy is played by the Lecturer.
- "Mary Jane/Mary Lane" now permanently replaces "Dead Old Man".
- "Five and Dime (Reprise)" was reinstated.
- The final reprise of "Reefer Madness" was cut; "The Truth" now ends the show.

== Cast ==
=== Original Los Angeles production ===
- The Lecturer: Harry S. Murphy
- Jimmy Harper: Christian Campbell
- Mary Lane: Jolie Jenkins
- Mae Coleman: Lori Alan
- Jack Stone/Jesus: Robert Torti
- Ralph Wiley: John Kassir
- Sally DeBanis: Erin Matthews
- Placard Girl: Samantha Harris
- Muezzin Duet: Michael Cunio, Rena Strober
- Monkey: Aukai Cain
- Ensemble: Aukai Cain, Michael Cunio, Kelly Thacker Fournier, Jeff Griggs, Erik Liberman, Lesli Margherita, Elijah Myles, Wendy Parker, Fidelia Rowe, Matt Shepard, Stacy Sibley, Rena Strober

During the run, Jolie Jenkins was replaced by Stacy Sibley, and alternates were added for a majority of the cast members, including Michael Cunio for Jimmy; Erik Liberman, J. P. Manoux and Paul Nygro for Ralph, and Larry Pointdexter for Jack/Jesus.

The Los Angeles production received five 1999 Ovation Awards, including Best Musical in a Smaller Theatre, Best Translation/Adaptation, Best Director, Best Costume Design in a Smaller Theatre, and Best Ensemble.

=== New York production ===
- The Lecturer: Gregg Edelman
- Jimmy: Christian Campbell
- Mary: Kristen Bell
- Mae: Michele Pawk
- Jack/Jesus: Robert Torti
- Ralph: John Kassir
- Sally: Erin Matthews
- Placard Girl: Roxanne Barlow
- Ensemble: Andrea Chamberlain, Robert Gallagher, Jennifer Gambatese, Paul Nygro, Michael Seelbach, Molly Zimpfer

=== Australian premiere production ===
- The Lecturer: Barry Crocker
- Jimmy: Brad Facey
- Mary: Jess Burns
- Mae: Belinda Morris
- Jack/Jesus: Richard Lovegrove
- Ralph: Jay James-Moody
- Sally: Emily Cascarino
- Placard Girl: Katie Headrick
- Ensemble: Andy Cook, Lucas Hall, Sophia Katos, Celeste O'Hara

=== 2024 Los Angeles production ===
- The Lecturer/Jack/Jesus: Bryan Daniel Porter
- Jimmy: Anthony Norman
- Mary: Darcy Rose Byrnes
- Mae: Nicole Parker
- Ralph: Thomas Dekker
- Sally: J. Elaine Marcos
- Ensemble: Jane Papageorge, Claire Crause, Alex Tho, Andre Joseph Aultmon, Natalie Holt MacDonald, David Toshiro Crane

== Recordings ==
The original cast recording was released by Madness Records in 1999, and has all the original songs (i.e. "The Monkey Song", "The Trial") plus two bonus tracks (the cut song "We Know Best", and "Weather Changes" from the musical "Valley of Kings").

In October 2008, Ghostlight Records released a soundtrack for both the original 1998 cast and the 2005 movie musical in a 2-disc CD set.

The 25th anniversary Los Angeles revival released a cast recording in January 2025.

== Film adaptation ==
Showtime produced a film adaptation in 2005; the movie musical features Kristen Bell as Mary, Christian Campbell as Jimmy, Ana Gasteyer as Mae, Steven Weber as Jack, Amy Spanger as Sally, John Kassir as Ralph, with Alan Cumming as The Lecturer, and Neve Campbell as Miss Poppy.
