= Grudge Match (disambiguation) =

Grudge Match is a 2013 film starring Sylvester Stallone and Robert De Niro.

Grudge Match may also refer to:

- The Grudge Match, a 1991 television game show
- "Grudge Match", a 2003 episode of Kim Possible
- "Grudge Match", a 2005 episode of Teenage Mutant Ninja Turtles
- "Grudge Match", a 2006 episode of Justice League Unlimited
- "Grudge Match", a 2006 episode of Ben 10
- "Grudge Match", a 2019 episode of Thomas & Friends
