= Alley Cat (film) =

1984 American action film

- Theatrical release poster
- Directed by: Victor M. Ordonez; Eduardo Palmos; Al Valletta
- Written by: Robert E. Waters
- Produced by: Victor M. Ordonez
- Starring: Karin Mani; Robert Torti
- Cinematography: Howard A. Anderson III
- Edited by: Robert Ernst
- Music by: Quito Colayco
- Production companies: Multicom Entertainment Group; Dragonfly Productions
- Distributed by: Film Ventures International (FVI)
- Release date: March 1984
- Running time: 82 minutes
- Country: United States
- Language: English

Alley Cat is a 1984 American exploitation action film directed by Victor M. Ordonez, Eduardo Palmos, and Al Valletta (all under the alias Edward Victor) and starring Karin Mani and Robert Torti.

== Plot ==
Billie, a Los Angeles black-belt karate expert, becomes the target of local gangster Scarface. After her grandparents are brutally assaulted, Billie personally sets out to make Scarface and his thugs pay.

== Cast ==
- Karin Mani as Billie
- Robert Torti as Johnny
- Michael Wayne as Scarface
- Jon Greene as Boyle
- Jay Fisher as Charles Clark
- Claudia Decea as Rose
- Tim Cutt as Thomas Vernon
- Jay Walker as Judge Taylor
- Moriah Shannon as Sam
- Marla Stone as Karen Stride
- Tony Oliver as Bob Mertel

== Reception ==
DVD Talk gave it 3 out of 5.
