= John Kassir =

American actor and comedian (b. 1957)

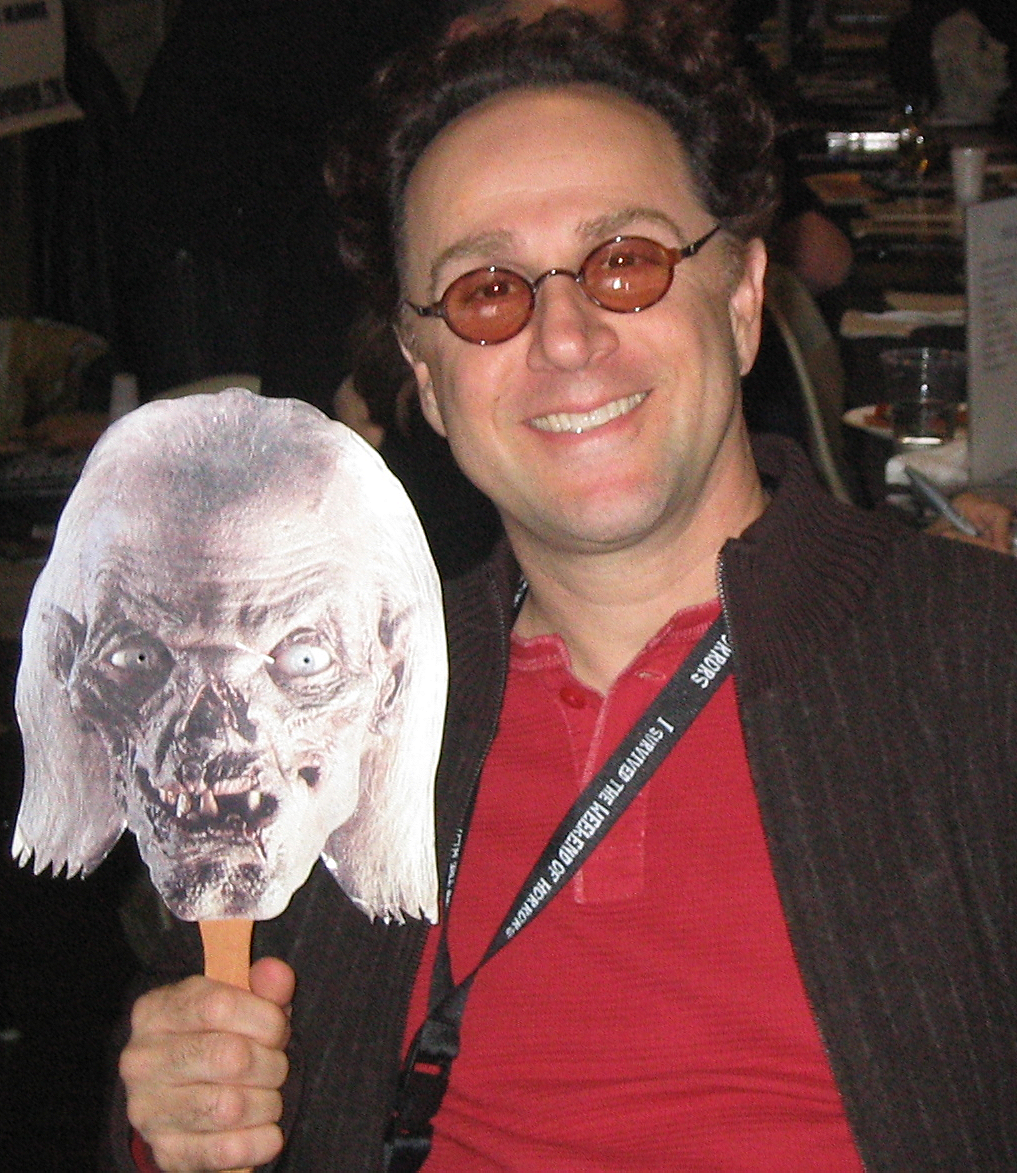
- Kassir holding a picture of the Cryptkeeper in 2006
- Born: October 24, 1957 (age 69); Baltimore, Maryland, U.S.
- Education: Towson State University
- Occupations: Actor; comedian
- Years active: 1983–present
- Spouse: Julie Benz (m. 1998; div. 2007)

John Kassir (born October 24, 1957) is an American actor and comedian. He is known for his work as the voice of the Cryptkeeper in HBO's Tales from the Crypt franchise. He also appeared in the role of Ralph in the off-Broadway show Reefer Madness and its 2005 film adaptation. He is also the first voice actor to take over Disney comics character Scrooge McDuck following the death of Alan Young.

== Early life and education ==
John Kassir was born on October 24, 1957, in Baltimore, Maryland, to an Iraqi father from Mosul and a Syrian mother from Mardin, present-day Turkey. He is of Assyrian descent.

As a child, he often did impressions in school and was described as a "class clown". His mother would often buy props for him and he would entertain customers who were shopping outside of Eudowood Plaza. He graduated from Loch Raven High School and attended Towson State University in Towson, Maryland, where he studied theatre. He and several other students formed a comedy troupe called Animal Crackers.

== Career ==
=== Stand-up comedy ===
Kassir originally began his career in stand-up comedy, he first became known in 1985, when he defeated Sinbad for best stand-up comic on Star Search.

As a stand-up comic, he has opened for the likes of Lou Rawls, Tom Jones, The Temptations and Four Tops on their TNT Tour, Bobby Vinton, Richard Belzer, U2, and Harry Blackstone Jr. among others. John has also appeared on stage performing improvisation with Robin Williams.

=== Film and television ===
His film credits include, And Then There Was Eve as G. Alexander, Flora & Ulysses as Ulysses', Hellblazers as Rick, Jack the Giant Slayer, Monster Mash as Igor, Monster Mutt as Pet Shop Pete, Reefer Madness: The Movie Musical as Ralph Wiley and Uncle Sam, Smothered and Spy Hard as Rancor Guard.

In television, he played the Bulgarian kicker, Zagreb Shkenusky, for 7 years in the HBO comedy series 1st & Ten, about a fictional football team. His other live-action credits include sketch-acting on The Amanda Show and a portrayal of Shemp Howard in the 2000 TV biopic The Three Stooges, produced by Mel Gibson, and Ralph in Reefer Madness: The Movie Musical. He was also able to get his own Pee-wee Herman style show in 1997 called Johnnytime, which aired for two seasons on the USA Network. He also appeared as The Atom in the Justice League of America pilot episode, which, despite not being picked up, was released as a film in some markets. Kassir has appeared in over a dozen feature films, starred in eight TV pilots (six of which went to series and two of which lasted on air for over six years each) and guest-starred in dozens of TV series in both comic and dramatic roles.

=== Voice acting ===
Kassir has specialized in voice-over work for animation, video games, and other productions, most notably as the voice of Crypt Keeper in Tales from the Crypt. He would later voice Ray "Raymundo" Rocket in Rocket Power. He also provided the voice for the mercenary Deadpool in the video games X-Men Legends II: Rise of Apocalypse, Marvel: Ultimate Alliance, and Marvel Ultimate Alliance 2, as well as for Sauron and Pyro, two other well-known characters. He was also featured in the very first commercial for the Nintendo cornerstone video game series The Legend of Zelda in the United States in 1987.

Kassir provided the vocal effects of the mischievous raccoon Meeko in Disney's 1995 animated feature Pocahontas and Pocahontas II: Journey to a New World. Also, he provided the voice of Buster Bunny in four Tiny Toon Adventures episodes (following Charlie Adler's departure from the role). He played the villainous Scuttlebutt in An American Tail: The Treasure of Manhattan Island. He also made one voice appearance in an episode of Ben 10, (Last Laugh) as Zombozo. He voiced the character Adam MacIntyre and provided additional voice over work in the video game Dead Rising. His voice is featured in the games Shadows of the Damned and Metal Gear Rising: Revengeance as Hell demons and Desperado Enforcement captain Monsoon, respectively. Additionally, he voiced Jibolba in the Tak and the Power of Juju video game series, Pete Puma in The Looney Tunes Show, Scissorsmith in Samurai Jack, and Mervis and Dunlap in CatDog.

In 2011, he voiced Crazy Smurf in the live-action/animated film The Smurfs, and in 2012, he voiced Jealousy as well as Gumball, Penny, Leslie, Carrie & Darwin when he possesses them in The Amazing World of Gumball episode "The Flower". Kassir appeared in Bryan Singer's Jack the Giant Slayer (2013), along with Bill Nighy, as Fallon, the two-headed leader of the giants; Nighy played the big head while Kassir played the small head. Kassir even voiced Elliot the Dragon in Disney's 2016 live-action remake of the 1977 live-action/animated movie Pete's Dragon.

Kassir also voiced Rizzo in the Spyro video game Skylanders: Spyro's Adventure, as well as Ghost Roaster and Captain Dreadbeard in Skylanders: Giants, Short Cut in Skylanders: Trap Team, and Pit Boss in Skylanders: Imaginators. He is also known for his various roles in the first season of The Amanda Show. He voiced the Ice King in the original Adventure Time pilot, but was replaced by Tom Kenny for the series. He also provided additional voice over work for Eek! The Cat, The Brothers Flub, Sonic the Hedgehog, Casper's Scare School, Spider-Man 3, Curious George 2: Follow That Monkey!, The Princess and the Frog, Diablo III, Diablo III: Reaper of Souls, Monsters University, The Prophet, Minions, Halo 5: Guardians, The Secret Life of Pets, Despicable Me 3, My Life as a Teenage Robot, The Grinch and The Secret Life of Pets 2.

=== Theatre ===
A few of his many theater credits include: originating the role of Kenny in Three Guys Naked From The Waist Down (also starring Scott Bakula), for which he was nominated for both a Drama Desk and an Outer Critics Circle award. John also originated the role of Ralph in the musical Reefer Madness, on stage and in the film version.

== Personal life ==
He married actress Julie Benz on May 30, 1998; the marriage lasted for nine years until Benz filed for divorce in December 2007.

== Filmography ==
=== Film ===
- American Scary – Himself – Crypt Keeper
- And Then There Was Eve – G. Alexander
- Beethoven's Christmas Adventure – Stray Dog
- Casper – voice of the Crypt Keeper
- Flora & Ulysses – Ulysses' vocal effects
- Hellblazers – Rick
- Jack the Giant Slayer – General Fallon's small head
- Monster Mash – Igor
- Monster Mutt – Pet Shop Pete
- Pete's Dragon – Elliot's vocals
- Race to Witch Mountain – Chuck
- Reefer Madness: The Movie Musical – Ralph Wiley and Uncle Sam in "Tell 'Em the Truth"
- Smothered – Himself
- Spy Hard – Rancor Guard at intercom
- Tales From the Crypt Presents: Bordello of Blood voice of The Crypt Keeper
- Tales From the Crypt Presents: Demon Knight voice of the Crypt Keeper

=== Television ===
- 1st & Ten – Zagreb Shkenusky
- Ask Harriet – Kenny
- Beethoven's Christmas Adventure – Stray Dog
- Bizarre Transmissions from the Bermuda Triangle – Himself
- Bones – Lawrence Melvoy
- Boston Common – Frankie
- Brotherly Love – The Crypt Keeper
- Bump and Grind (pilot) – Dick Scorvo
- Castle – Mr. Dreyfus
- Charmed – The Alchemist
- Cold Case – Kip Crowley (Episode: "Greed")
- CSI: Crime Scene Investigation – Hotel Guest (Episode: "Assume Nothing")
- Dream On – Chuck (Episode: "The Guilty Party")
- Dysfunctional with No Filter Paul and Denise – Himself (2016)
- Early Edition – Jersy Carpathian
- Friends – Stanley
- FM – Don Tupsouni
- Grounded for Life – Musgrove
- Hangin' with Mr. Cooper – Photographer
- Hot in Cleveland – The Pope
- In Living Color – Himself
- Jenny – Chaz
- Joan of Arcadia – Mime God
- Johnnytime – Johnny
- Last Chance Lloyd – Teacher
- Lenny – Max
- Love Boat: The Next Wave – Dmitri Shishtokovich
- Malcolm & Eddie – Rooster
- McBride: Tune in for Murder – Danny Doyle
- Moonlighting – Police Detective (Episode: "Yours, Very Deadly")
- Mr. Rhodes – Mr. Kotter
- Mystic Cosmic Patrol – Martini Bot
- NCIS – Perry Swan
- New Wave Comedy – Himself
- Philly – Arnie Kellogg
- Secrets of the Cryptkeeper's Haunted House – The Crypt Keeper
- Showtime at the Apollo – Himself
- Sliders – Arnold Potts
- Star Search – Himself
- Star Trek: Voyager – Gar (Episode: "Critical Care")
- Tales from the Crypt – The Crypt Keeper
- Team Knight Rider – Plato
- The Amanda Show – Regular Performer
- The Facts of Life (1 episode) – Andre
- The Handler – Charlie
- The New Mike Hammer – Ventriloquist
- The Single Guy – Maitre 'D, Waiter
- The Three Stooges – Shemp Howard
- The Visitor – Himself
- Tour of Duty – Lenny Pilchowski
- Two Minutes to Midnight – Bob

=== Animated film ===
- An American Tail: The Treasure of Manhattan Island – Scuttlebutt
- And Then There Was Eve – G. Alexander
- Bayonetta: Bloody Fate – Enzo
- Casper's Scare School – P.A. Voice, Additional voices
- Chance Manifest – Ronnie
- Channels – Walter
- Curious George 2: Follow That Monkey! – Additional voices
- Cyber-Tracker 2 – Tripwire
- Despicable Me 3 – Additional voices
- Donner Pass – James Michael Epstein
- Dr. Rage – Moe Moebius
- Encino Woman – Jean Michel
- George of the Jungle 2 – Voice of Rocky, Armando
- Ghost Cat Anzu – Voice of Master
- Heartstoppers: Horror at the Movies – Voice Over Announcer
- Jack the Giant Slayer – General Fallon's Small Head
- Justice League of America – Atom/Ray Palmer
- Minions – Additional voices
- Minions: The Rise of Gru – Additional voices
- Minkow – Jim Cowell
- Mockingbird Lane – Tim (uncredited)
- Monsters University – Additional Voices
- Nothing Special – Marty
- No York City –
- Pirate Camp – Blackbeard's Head
- Planes – Additional voices
- Pocahontas – Meeko
- Pocahontas II: Journey to a New World – Meeko
- Reefer Madness: Grass Roots – Himself
- Tales from the Crypt Presents: Ritual – The Crypt Keeper
- Sing – Additional voices
- Sing 2 – Additional voices
- Smothered – Himself
- Soccer Dog: European Cup – Quint
- Spaced Out! – Himself
- Tales from the Crypt: New Year's Shockin' Eve – The Crypt Keeper
- The Dog Days of Winter – Coffee Shop Manager
- The Glass Jar – John
- The Gunrunner Billy Kane – Machinist
- The Grinch – Additional voices
- The Horror Hall of Fame II – The Crypt Keeper
- The Midget Stays in the Picture – B List Director
- The Misunderstanding of Carl Jr. – Boots, Berko
- The Princess and the Frog – Additional Voices
- The Prophet – Additional voices
- The Secret Life of Pets – Additional voices
- The Secret Life of Pets 2 – Additional voices
- The Smurfs – Crazy Smurf
- The Smurfs 2 – Crazy Smurf
- The Taker – John
- The Tale of Tillie's Dragon – Herman
- The Wild – Additional voices
- The Wild Thornberrys Movie – Squirrel #1
- Tiny Toons' Night Ghoulery – Buster Bunny
- Tiny Toons Spring Break – Buster Bunny
- Vidiots – Lester Plotz

=== Animation ===
- Aaahh!!! Real Monsters – Additional voices
- Adventure Time – Additional voices
- Afro Samurai – Soshun
- As Told by Ginger – Winston, Additional voices
- Avatar: The Last Airbender – Chey
- Back at the Barnyard – Winky
- Ben 10 – Zombozo, Thief #1
- Bonkers – Additional voices
- Breadwinners – Additional voices
- Bunnicula – Ash
- Buzz Lightyear of Star Command – Marl, Evan Zarl, Snark, Zinko
- CatDog – Mervis, Dunglap, Additional voices
- Danger Rangers – Fallbot
- DC Super Friends – Joker's Playhouse – Joker
- Dexter's Laboratory – Additional voices
- Dota: Dragon's Blood – Vahdrak
- Duckman – Additional voices
- Earthworm Jim – Snott, Henchrat
- Eek! The Cat – Mittens, Additional voices
- Hercules – Charon
- JJ Villard's Fairy Tales – Pinocchio, Gelato
- Johnny Bravo – Additional voices
- Kim Possible – Additional voices
- Kung Fu Panda: Legends of Awesomeness – Sai So, Sanzu
- Mickey Mouse (holiday specials) – Scrooge McDuck (replacing Alan Young)
- Mighty Ducks – Beldar
- My Life as a Teenage Robot – Additional voices
- New Looney Tunes – Pete Puma
- Oh Yeah! Cartoons – Randy, Aunt Broth, Hobart, The Fisherman, Riot Man #1
- Problem Child – Yoji, Murph
- Random! Cartoons – Ice King, Fire Elemental, Bone, The Soldier Flies, Dugly Uckling, Kung Pao Bunny
- Rick and Morty – Blim Blam
- Rocket Power – Ray "Raymundo" Rocket, Additional voices
- Samurai Jack – Scissorsmith
- Scooby-Doo! in Arabian Nights – Haman
- Solar Opposites – The Crypt Keeper
- Super Robot Monkey Team Hyperforce Go! – Wigglenog, Short Mercenary
- Tales from the Cryptkeeper – The Crypt Keeper
- Teamo Supremo – Cheapskate
- Teenage Mutant Ninja Turtles – Dark Beaver, Dave Beaver
- The Adventures of Jimmy Neutron: Boy Genius – Seymour, Student #2, Pants (Ep. When Pants Attack)
- The Brothers Flub – Additional voices
- The Cartoon Cartoon Show – Leopard
- The Flintstones: On the Rocks – Additional voices
- The Grim Adventures of Billy & Mandy – Additional voices
- The Little Mermaid – Rats
- The Looney Tunes Show – Pete Puma, Nametag Guy, Craig, Cop #2
- The Mummy: Secrets of the Medjai – Sub Pilot Dimitri
- The Plucky Duck Show – Buster Bunny (archive footage)
- The Simpsons – Additional voices
- The Weekenders – Tripp Nickerson
- The Wild Thornberrys – El Gordita
- Time Squad – Alfred Nobel, Rasputin, Thomas Jefferson
- Timon & Pumbaa – Additional voices
- Tiny Toon Adventures – Buster Bunny (replacing Charlie Adler)
- Totally Spies! – Additional voices
- What-a-Mess – Additional voices

=== Video games ===
- Afro Samurai – Soshun, Additional voices\
- Arknights – Friston-3
- Batman: Arkham Origins – Voice Cast
- Bayonetta 2 – Enzo
- Bayonetta 3 – Enzo
- Bouncers – Additional voices
- Dead Rising – Adam MacIntyre, Additional voices
- Diablo III – Additional Voices
- Diablo III: Reaper of Souls – Additional voices
- EverQuest II – Additional Voices
- Final Fantasy XV – Ifrit
- Freelancer – Additional voices
- Halo 2 – Marines
- Halo 5: Guardians – Additional voices
- Halo: The Master Chief Collection – Marine (archive sound)
- Icewind Dale – Belhifet, Poquelin, Additional voices
- Lego Jurassic World – Additional voices
- Madagascar – Additional voices
- Marvel: Ultimate Alliance – Deadpool
- Marvel: Ultimate Alliance 2 – Deadpool, Venom (Wii / PS2)
- Master of Orion: Conquer the Stars – Alkari Advisor, Additional voices
- Metal Gear Rising: Revengeance – Monsoon
- MySims Kingdom – Sim
- Ninety-Nine Nights II – Galdo, Zign, Villager
- PlayStation Move Heroes – Toucan
- République – Noam Peretz
- Rocket Power: Team Rocket Rescue – Ray "Raymundo" Rocket
- Rocket Power: Beach Bandits – Ray "Raymundo" Rocket, Cyrax
- Sacrifice – Additional voices
- Shadows of the Damned – Demons
- Shrek SuperSlam – Announcer, Humpty Dumpty
- Sorcerers of the Magic Kingdom – Meeko
- Skylanders: Giants – Ghost Roaster, Captain Dreadbeard
- Skylanders: Imaginators – Ghost Roaster, Pit Boss, Short Cut, Rizzo
- Skylanders: Spyro's Adventure – Ghost Roaster, Captain Dreadbeard, Rizzo
- Skylanders: SuperChargers – Ghost Roaster, Short Cut, Captain Frightbeard, Spellslamzer
- Skylanders: Swap Force – Ghost Roaster
- Skylanders: Trap Team – Ghost Roaster, Short Cut, Rizzo, Captain Dreadbeard
- Spider-Man: Shattered Dimensions – Scorpion 2099, Kron Stone, Deadpool's fans
- Spider-Man 3 – Additional voices
- Syphon Filter: The Omega Strain – Birchim, Co-Pilot, FBI Officer B, Officer A, Zohar
- T'ai Fu: Wrath of the Tiger – Monkey Master, Rat Pirate
- Tak: The Great Juju Challenge – Jibolba
- Tak 2: The Staff of Dreams – Jibolba
- Tak and the Power of Juju – Jibolba
- The Punisher – Additional voices
- Tiny Toon Adventures: Buster and the Beanstalk – Buster Bunny
- Ultimate Spider-Man – Additional voices
- Universe at War: Earth Assault – Additional voices
- X-Men Legends II: Rise of Apocalypse – Deadpool, Pyro, Sauron

== Theatre ==
- 3 Guys Naked from the Waist Down – Kenny Brewster
- Room Service – Faker Englund
- La Fiaca – Nester
- Reefer Madness – Ralph Wiley
- The Glorious Ones – Dottore
- Safe – Danny Green
- Man of La Mancha – Malachi Stack
- Silence! The Musical – Jack Crawford
- A Midsummer Night's Dream – Puck
- The New American Theatre Festival of New One Act Plays – Performer
