= Vinnie & Bobby =

American television series

- Genre: Sitcom
- Created by: Arthur Silver; Ron Leavitt
- Written by: Marjorie Gross; Ron Leavitt; Ron Zimmerman; Ellen L. Fogle
- Directed by: James Widdoes; Howard Murray
- Starring: Matt LeBlanc; Robert Torti; John Pinette; Joey Lauren Adams; Sharyn Leavitt; Ron Taylor; Fred Stoller
- Opening theme: "Vinnie & Bobby" performed by Jimmy Thrill Quill & Danny Harvey
- Composer: Jonathan Wolff
- Country of origin: United States
- Original language: English
- No. of seasons: 1
- No. of episodes: 7

Production
- Cinematography: Mark J. Levin
- Camera setup: Multi-camera
- Running time: 30 minutes
- Production companies: ELP Communications; Columbia Pictures Television

Original release
- Network: Fox
- Release: May 30 – July 11, 1992

Related
- Top of the Heap; Married... with Children

Vinnie & Bobby is an American television sitcom that aired on Fox from May 30 to July 11, 1992. The series was a spin-off of the 1991 sitcom Top of the Heap, which was itself a spin-off of Married... with Children. Series star Matt LeBlanc played the character of Vinnie Verducci on all three shows, as did Joey Lauren Adams as Mona Mullins, although she only appeared in the backdoor pilot of the Married... with Children episode.

As of November 2020, Canadian residents can stream the series on CTV's website.

== Premise ==
Set in Chicago, Illinois, the series centers on Vinnie Verducci (Matt LeBlanc), a construction worker, and his roommate, Bobby Grazzo (Robert Torti), who share the same apartment Vinnie and his father once shared. Vinnie's father Charlie (Joseph Bologna) has apparently moved away, Vinnie's cat Mr. Fluffy has disappeared, and Bobby is moving his way in and has gotten Vinnie a job at a construction site. Others shown were Mona Mullins (Joey Lauren Adams), their 17-year-old neighbor, who still has a crush on Vinnie and is repulsed by her new neighbor Bobby. Other characters include fellow construction workers Bill Belli (John Pinette), Stanley (Ron Taylor), and Fred Slacker (Fred Stoller). One theme this show added to its predecessor is at the end of two episodes, the cast would begin an a cappella rendition of a song; for example, in episode five, Vinnie, Bobby, Bill, Stanley, and Fred begin to sing "Get a Job" by the Silhouettes before the end credits roll.

== Cast ==
- Note: This table counts the pilot of Top of the Heap, and the same-titled episode of Married... with Children as two different episodes. Without this change, Mona Mullins would not be in any Married... with Children episodes and Vinnie Verducci would be in two ("Old Ones But Young'ns" and "Kelly Takes Hollywood: Part 1").

Actor	Role	Appearances in other shows	Episodes appeared
Matt LeBlanc	Vinnie Verducci	10, 3 episodes of Married... with Children, all of Top of the Heap	1-7
Robert Torti	Bobby Grazzo	1 episode of Top of the Heap	1-7
Joey Lauren Adams	Mona Mullins	10, 3 episodes of Married... with Children, all of Top of the Heap	1-7
John Pinette	Bill Belli	—N/a	1-7
Ron Taylor	Stanley	—N/a	2-7
Sharyn Leavitt	Winnie	—N/a	2-7
Fred Stoller	Fred Slacker	—N/a	3-7
Mike Genovese	Jim Wotowski	—N/a	1-2

== Episodes ==
No.	Title	Directed by	Written by	Original release date
1	"Full Heap"	James Widdoes	Ron Leavitt & Ellen L. Fogle	May 30, 1992
Dull-witted Vinnie Verducci, no longer living with his father, moves into another apartment in the building and takes a new job at a construction site, where he meets Bobby Grazzo, a fellow construction worker whom he asks to become his roommate to help in paying the rent. Meanwhile, Mona Mullins is still pursuing Vinnie on whom she still has a world-sized crush.
2	"It's in the Bag"	James Widdoes	Marjorie Gross & Ron Zimmerman	June 6, 1992
Bobby starts dating Vinnie's night-school teacher. Guest appearances: Colleen Morris, Mike Genovese, and Barbara Alyn Woods
3	"Killer Shiller"	James Widdoes	Ron Zimmerman	June 13, 1992
A co-worker tells Vinnie that his date looks like a wanted serial killer. Guest: Robin Christopher
4	"Vinnie Gets Sued"	James Widdoes	Marjorie Gross	June 20, 1992
When Vinnie rescues an old guy from muggers, one of the attackers sues him. Guests: Kevin Cart as Denny, Rocky Giordani as Gus, Debbe Dunning, Monica Lacy, Frank Lloyd as Frankie, Vidal Peter, Meg Register, and William Smith as Bean
5	"The Belli Ache"	James Widdoes	Calvin Brown, Jr. & Kim Weiskopf	June 27, 1992
Vinnie and Bobby try to get rid of Bill when he moves in with them. Guest: Robyn Killian
6	"Spring Is In The Air"	James Widdoes	Ron Zimmerman & Eddie Gorodetsky	July 4, 1992
Vinnie must learn to write poetry, and Bobby must become a physics professor to get dates with their high-school girlfriends. Guests: Lori Butler, Mark J. Goodman, Vidal Peterson as Carl Sweetwater, John Pinette as William Melvin Belli, Jennifer Runyon as Hillary Bomgarden, Julie Uribe, and Kym Whitley
7	"The Credit Card"	Howard Murray	Eddie Gorodetsky	July 11, 1992
Bobby's shopping spree ruins Vinnie's plans of buying a motorcycle. Guests: Cosie Costa, Colleen Morris as Casey, and Hiram Kasten
