= Show Me the Buffet =

Show Me The Buffet

Live album by John Pinette
- Released: 1998
- Recorded: April 14, 1998, Vernon Hills, IL
- Genre: Stand-up comedy
- Length: 48:41
- Label: Uproar Entertainment
- Producer: David Drozen

John Pinette chronology
Show Me The Buffet (1998)	Making Lite of Myself (2007)

Show Me The Buffet is stand-up comedian John Pinette's first comedy album. It is a recording of a performance in Vernon Hills, Illinois.

== Track listing ==
1. "Weight Watcher Friends" – 1:46
2. "Halloween" – 1:36
3. "The Great Meat Recall" – 2:23
4. "Disneyworld In August / The Character Buffet" – 3:53
5. "All You Can Eat" – 2:16
6. "Grab and Move" – 1:55
7. "The Wonderful Wizard Of Oz Buffet" – 2:37
8. "Chinese Buffet/You Go Now" – 3:28
9. "Japanese Food/Free Willy" – 6:07
10. "The Water Park, The Slide & The Tube" – 7:42
11. "Bungee Jump" – 0:53
12. "World Hunger" – 2:03
13. "Send'um Wheat" – 1:24
14. "Indian Food" – 1:30
15. "Sonna a Formato" – 2:50
16. "A Gas Problem" – 1:57
17. "When the Spice Hits" – 1:47
18. "Chipmunk Funk" – 1:28
19. "Elvis" – 1:06
