= Duets (film) =

- Theatrical release poster
- Directed by: Bruce Paltrow
- Screenplay by: John Byrum
- Produced by: John Byrum; Kevin Jones; Bruce Paltrow
- Starring: Maria Bello; Andre Braugher; Paul Giamatti; Huey Lewis; Gwyneth Paltrow; Scott Speedman
- Cinematography: Paul Sarossy
- Edited by: Gerald B. Greenberg
- Music by: David Newman
- Production companies: Seven Arts Pictures; Beacon Pictures
- Distributed by: Buena Vista Pictures Distribution (Note: Distributed under the Hollywood Pictures banner.)
- Release dates: September 9, 2000 (TIFF); September 15, 2000 (United States)
- Running time: 112 minutes
- Country: United States
- Language: English
- Budget: $21 million
- Box office: $6.6 million

Duets is a 2000 American road musical comedy drama film co-produced and directed by Bruce Paltrow, and written by John Byrum. The motion picture features an ensemble cast with Gwyneth Paltrow, Huey Lewis, Paul Giamatti, Maria Bello, Angie Dickinson, Scott Speedman, and Andre Braugher among others. The movie "revolves around the little known world of karaoke competitions and the wayward characters who inhabit it." Duets premiered at TIFF on September 9, 2000 before being released by Hollywood Pictures (through Buena Vista Pictures Distribution) on September 15, 2000. The film received negative reviews from critics and grossed $6.6 million against a $21 million budget, making it a box office bomb.

== Plot ==
The story revolves around unrelated pairs of people who spend time in karaoke bars across the United States in the week leading up to a big contest in Omaha.

Ricky Dean, a hustler on the karaoke circuit, travels from town to town feigning ambivalence of karaoke, then winning both the contests and side bets with locals. Detoured by a phone call, he travels to Las Vegas for the funeral of an ex; while there, he meets his daughter Liv, with whom he has not had contact for many years. Seeking a father figure after her mother's death, Liv joins him on the road against his wishes, both singing solos at karaoke bars. They are involved in a bar fight when one of Ricky's marks retaliates.

Depressed California salesman Todd Woods is so exhausted from business travel he does not even know what city he is in. When he arrives home, his wife Candy and two children are too self-absorbed to even say hello. He walks out on his family and his old life, driving aimlessly. He wanders into a karaoke bar in New Mexico, where a fellow participant offers beta blockers to help him overcome his anxiety and stage fright. Todd gets hooked on the drugs as he keeps driving.

In Utah, Todd picks up hitchhiker Reggie Kane, a charismatic but violent fugitive convict, who recently robbed at gunpoint a truck driver who gave him a lift. They form an unlikely friendship after Reggie reveals a beautiful singing voice during a duet at a karaoke bar. Todd's mental health deteriorates further as Reggie tries to keep him out of trouble; he first has to drag Todd out of a hotel when he threatens the clerk with a gun; then, after he causes a standoff at a service station, Reggie shoots and kills the attendant. Reggie arranges for Candy to meet them in Omaha, but an emotionless Todd rejects her, insisting he is finished with his former life.

Cincinnati-based underachieving cab driver and once aspiring priest Billy Hannan goes on a drinking binge after catching his partner cheating on him. He meets Suzi Loomis, a broke drifter who gets by on karaoke contest prizes and sexual favors. Neither respects the other's lifestyle, but Billy nonetheless agrees to drive her to California, stopping at karaoke bars for her to compete along the way.

All three pairs end up at the Omaha contest, each having won the right to compete there for $5,000 after winning in a smaller town. Finally accepting his daughter, Ricky invites her to perform a duet of her mother's favorite song, "Cruisin'". Billy discovers that Suzi has stage fright when he finds her in the ladies' room, vomiting, but he convinces her to compete. Reggie sees the police arrive, investigating the service station shooting. Performing an a cappella version of "Free Bird", he pulls his gun on stage, prompting police to shoot him; putting the full blame for the service station shooting on Reggie, and freeing Todd to return to his family.

After the contest, Billy and Suzi continue on their way to California. Billy invites Liv (with whom he had been flirting at the contest) and Ricky to join them, and they resolve to take a slight detour to another karaoke contest in Nevada. Todd and Candy fly home together on his frequent flyer miles.

== Cast ==
- Maria Bello as Suzi Loomis
- Andre Braugher as Reggie Kane
- Paul Giamatti as Todd Woods
- Huey Lewis as Ricky Dean
- Gwyneth Paltrow as Liv Dean
- Scott Speedman as Billy Hannan
- Marian Seldes as Harriet Gahagan
- Angie Dickinson as Blair
- Kiersten Warren as Candy Woods
- Angie Phillips as Arlene
- Lochlyn Munro as Ronny Jackson
- John Pinette as Finals singer
- Michael Bublé as Finals singer
- Maya Rudolph as Omaha Hostess
- Keegan Connor Tracy as Shelia
- Brent Butt as Hotel clerk
- Aaron Pearl as Buddy
- Steve Oatway as Ralph Beckerman

== Production ==
Bruce Paltrow spent several years trying to get the project started. The film was produced outside Disney's main production channels and was acquired and financed by Buena Vista Film Sales and was distributed through Hollywood Pictures.

This was the only time Gwyneth Paltrow and her producer/director father Bruce Paltrow worked together on a film project, and it was also Bruce Paltrow's last production before his death.

Brad Pitt was first cast in Speedman's role, but, after he and Gwyneth Paltrow announced the end of their off-camera romance, Pitt decided not to take the role.

=== Film locations ===
The film locations include Las Vegas, Nevada; British Columbia, Canada; and Los Angeles, California.

== Reception ==
The film received a 21% on Rotten Tomatoes according to 92 critics, with the consensus being "Duets suffers from sloppy direction and stretches credibility. Also, the characters are uninteresting and it's hard to care about what happens to them." Metacritic, which uses a weighted average, assigned the film a score of 40 out of 100, based on 29 critics, indicating "mixed or average" reviews.

Film critic Roger Ebert gave the film a thumbs down on his television program, and wrote on his newspaper review, "Duets has little islands of humor and even perfection, floating in a sea of missed marks and murky intentions." Kenneth Turan, film critic for the Los Angeles Times, described the film as "six characters in search of a movie. Any movie will do..."

Critic Bob Graham, writing for the San Francisco Chronicle, liked the spirit of the film and the acting, and he wrote, "Cut 'Duets' some slack. This is an appealing, and ultimately moving, ensemble comedy/drama about ordinary folks whose one chance at anything resembling stardom is a karaoke contest...The fable style is a fragile one. The Ally McBeal test probably applies here. Fans of that show are likely to give themselves over to Duets, too."

Variety critic Todd McCarthy singled out Giamatti's work and character, writing, "Giamatti gets the lion's share of Byrum's good lines and if the film is to go over with auds, it will be largely due to this character and performance, which reps one of the funniest sustained rants against the lowest common denominator in American culture that has been seen in ages."

Overall, many critics echoed Stephanie Zacharek's review in Salon.com. She wrote, "Its three interlocking stories don't find the right rhythmic balance, and some of the dialogue is stiff and mannered." Zacharek did praise the acting and the film's message. She added, "In that respect, the way Duets treats its characters is refreshing. There are brief moments when it reminds us that plenty of people enjoy karaoke at the expense of their audience (during one scene an Asian businessman warbles tunelessly in the background), but Duets isn't out to make anyone look ridiculous."

== Distribution ==
The producers marketed the film using the following tagline:

Six lost souls in search of a little harmony.

The film was first presented at the 2000 Toronto International Film Festival on September 9, 2000. When released nationwide on September 15, 2000, it suffered at the box office. The first week's gross sales at the box office was $2,002,588 (581 screens) and the total receipts for the run were $4,734,235.

In its widest release the film was featured in 583 theaters and the film was in circulation for seven weeks. The production budget was $16,000,000.

== Home media ==
A VHS videocassette and DVD of the film was released on May 8, 2001 by Hollywood Pictures Home Entertainment. The DVD contained additional features: a commentary track by director Bruce Paltrow and producer Kevin Jones, additional scenes, conversations with director Bruce Paltrow, and a multi-angle music video of "Cruisin'."

A bare bones Blu-ray version of the film was released on May 15, 2012 from Mill Creek Entertainment. Kino Lorber, porting over the bonus material on the DVD, re-released it on Blu-ray on May 5, 2019.

== Soundtrack ==
Duets: Original Soundtrack

Soundtrack album
- Released: September 12, 2000
- Genre: Various
- Label: Hollywood

An original motion picture soundtrack album was released on September 12, 2000, by Hollywood Records. The CD contained twelve tracks, including original music composed for the film by David Newman. Actors Huey Lewis, Gwyneth Paltrow, Paul Giamatti, and Maria Bello all performed the songs featured in the film, while professional vocalist Arnold McCuller sings all of Andre Braugher's parts including the a cappella version of Lynyrd Skynyrd's "Free Bird".

The soundtrack spawned two hit singles in Australia, including Gwyneth Paltrow and Huey Lewis' "Cruisin'" which spent two weeks at No. 1. and Paltrow's "Bette Davis Eyes" which hit # 3 there. "Cruisin'" did even better in New Zealand, spending five weeks at No. 1.

Michael Bublé has a cameo singing "Strangers in the Night", but the song is not included on the soundtrack.

No.	Title	Writer(s)	Performer(s)	Length
1.	"Feeling Alright"	Dave Mason	Huey Lewis	4:03
2.	"Bette Davis Eyes"	Donna Weiss, Jackie DeShannon	Gwyneth Paltrow	4:20
3.	"Cruisin'"	Smokey Robinson, Marv Tarplin	Gwyneth Paltrow, Huey Lewis	4:52
4.	"Just My Imagination (Running Away with Me)"	Norman Whitfield, Barrett Strong	Babyface, Gwyneth Paltrow	4:10
5.	"Try a Little Tenderness"	Jimmy Campbell, Reg Connelly, Harry M. Woods	Paul Giamatti, Arnold McCuller	3:36
6.	"Hello It's Me"	Todd Rundgren	Paul Giamatti	4:12
7.	"I Can't Make You Love Me"	Mike Reid, Allen Shamblin	Maria Bello	4:22
8.	"Sweet Dreams (Are Made of This)"	Annie Lennox, David A. Stewart	Maria Bello	4:31
9.	"Lonely Teardrops"	Berry Gordy, Tyran Carlo, Gwendolyn Gordy	Huey Lewis	3:01
10.	"Copacabana (At the Copa)"	Barry Manilow, Bruce Sussman, Jack Feldman	John Pinette	3:46
11.	"Free Bird"	Allen Collins, Ronnie Van Zant	Arnold McCuller	1:23
12.	"Beginnings/Endings"	David Newman	David Newman	1:59

=== Certifications ===
Certifications for Duets: Original Soundtrack
Region	Certification	Certified units/sales
Australia (ARIA)	Gold	35,000^{^}
United States (RIAA)	Gold	500,000^{^}
^{^} Shipments figures based on certification alone.
