= Reefer Madness: The Movie Musical =

2005 American musical comedy film

- DVD cover
- Genre: Musical; Comedy
- Based on: Reefer Madness by Kevin Murphy; Dan Studney
- Screenplay by: Kevin Murphy; Dan Studney
- Directed by: Andy Fickman
- Starring: Kristen Bell; Christian Campbell; Neve Campbell; Alan Cumming; Ana Gasteyer; John Kassir; Amy Spanger; Robert Torti; Steven Weber
- Narrated by: Alan Cumming
- Music by: Dan Studney; David Manning; Nathan Wang
- Countries of origin: United States; Canada; Germany
- Original language: English

Production
- Producers: Andy Fickman; Kevin Murphy; Dan Studney
- Cinematography: Jan Kiesser
- Editor: Jeff Freeman
- Running time: 108 minutes
- Production company: Dead Old Man Productions
- Budget: $25 million

Original release
- Network: Showtime
- Release: April 16, 2005

Reefer Madness: The Movie Musical, also known as Reefer Madness, is a 2005 American made-for-television musical comedy film directed by Andy Fickman, written by Kevin Murphy and Dan Studney, and produced by the three. A film adaptation of the trio's 1998 musical of the same name, itself based on the 1936 exploitation film also of the same title, it premiered on Showtime on April 16, 2005. The film also received a limited theatrical release overseas, and grossed $8,972 in its short run.

The film stars Kristen Bell, Christian Campbell, and John Kassir reprising their stage roles, with the notable addition of Alan Cumming and Ana Gasteyer in other lead roles. Robert Torti, who played both Jack and Jesus onstage, portrays only the latter in this version.

== Plot ==
In a small middle-America town in 1936, a group of parents have been gathered by a mysterious Lecturer for an assembly. The ominous Lecturer informs the parents that he has come to warn them about the evils of marijuana on their youth ("Reefer Madness") through the tragic tale of one boy's struggles with the demon weed in a film titled "Tell Your Children". Throughout the film, the Lecturer stops to detail a political point or to condescend anyone questioning his credibility.

Jimmy Harper and Mary Lane, a joyful teen couple, blissfully enjoy each other's company ("Romeo & Juliet"), unaware of the seedy goings-on in The Reefer Den across town. This is the residence of Mae, who is abused by her boyfriend, Jack, a street tough who supplies her and others with dope ("The Stuff"). Mary, Jimmy and their schoolmates head to Miss Poppy's Five and Dime, ("Down at the Ol' Five and Dime"). Jack arrives at the hangout to corrupt more young people, offering Jimmy swing lessons to impress Mary.

Jimmy is taken to the Reefer Den, where Jack, Mae, college dropout Ralph, and neighborhood prostitute Sally pressure him into smoking his first joint, leading him to a hallucination of an insidious bacchanal. ("Jimmy Takes a Hit/ The Orgy"). Jimmy turns into a crazed addict and neglects Mary, leading her to pray for him ("Lonely Pew"). While breaking into a church to steal collection money, Jimmy has a vision of Jesus Christ in a Vegas-esque Heaven, telling him to change his ways or be sent to eternal damnation ("Listen to Jesus, Jimmy"). Jimmy refuses to heed the word of God and continues to spiral into sin.

One night, Jimmy and Sally take a joyride in Mary's stolen Packard while buzzed, running over an old man. Jimmy runs to Mary, debating whether to continue being under the influence or repent ("Mary Jane/ Mary Lane"). Jimmy returns to Mary romantically, but he realizes that he is putting her in danger and tells her that he must leave town without her. Jack brings him back to the Reefer Den with a pot-brownie, putting him in a cartoonized trip ("The Brownie Song"). Mary follows Jimmy to the Den where Ralph seduces her by convincing her that Jimmy has joined his "fraternity". He suggests that they celebrate with a smoke, which turns out to be a toke. This intro to reefer immediately turns Mary into a sadistic dominatrix who terrorizes Ralph for pleasure ("Little Mary Sunshine"). Jimmy enters and a fight ensues. Jack stops the fight, knocks out Jimmy and accidentally shoots Mary. He frames an unconscious Jimmy for the crime. Jimmy gives Mary his class ring, and comforts her as she dies in his arms ("Mary's Death").

Jimmy is taken away by police. Racked with guilt, Ralph has pot-induced hallucinations of Jimmy as a ghost, Mary as Satan's sodomy pal and the children who got hooked on the Reefer Gang's dope as the living dead. Ralph gets an extreme case of the munchies and ends up killing and cannibalizing Sally. Jack shoots Ralph to stop him ("Murder!"). Seeing similar visions, Mae realizes the error of her ways and implores Jack to do the same. He rejects her pleas and she bludgeons him to death with a garden hoe, gaining her much-needed empowerment ("The Stuff (Reprise)").

Mae pleads to the visiting President about Jimmy's case, earning the boy a presidential pardon. Jimmy, Mae, the President and Jimmy's fellow prisoners, Ralph, Jack, and Sally (reincarnated as Uncle Sam, George Washington, and Lady Liberty respectively) raise the American justice system and patriotism ("Tell 'Em the Truth"). Jimmy burns down the Reefer Den's weed garden, freeing Mary from both Hell and Satan before everyone's eyes. The Lecturer's film ends with Mary entering Heaven, greeted by Jesus and other Holy souls.

The entire audience joins the cast to hold a huge anti-reefer book burning, pledging to join the fight against marijuana, sex, racial and ethnic minorities, and other things harmful to their dear country ("Finale"). The Lecturer drives off, pleased that he has succeeded in exploiting everyone's biases.

== Cast ==
=== Principal cast ===
- Alan Cumming as The Lecturer, The Goat Man, Franklin Delano Roosevelt, and other minor characters
- Christian Campbell as James Fenimore "Jimmy" Harper
- Kristen Bell as Mary Lane
- Steven Weber as Jack Stone / George Washington in "Tell 'Em the Truth"
- Ana Gasteyer as Mae Coleman
- John Kassir as Ralph Wiley / Uncle Sam in "Tell 'Em the Truth"
- Amy Spanger as Sally DeBanis / Statue of Liberty in "Tell 'Em the Truth"
- Robert Torti as Jesus
- Neve Campbell as Miss Poppy

=== Supporting cast ===
- Abraham Jedidiah as Dead Old Man
- Christine Lakin as Joan of Arc
- John Mann as Satan
- Harry S. Murphy as Warden Harrah
- Tom Arntzen as Officer D.J. Sordelet
- Ken Kirzinger as Secret Service Agent Matthews
- Chang Tseng as Asian Man
- Britt Irvin and Alexz Johnson as Arc-ettes

=== Lecture assembly ===
- Kevin McNulty as Mayor Harris Macdonald
- Stephen Sisk as Blumsack, the Lecturer's projectionist assistant
- Robert Clarke as Principal Poindexter Short
- Lynda Boyd as Mrs. Deidre Greevey
- Ruth Nichol as Mrs. Roxanne MacDonald
- Michael Goorjian as Mickey Druther

== Musical numbers ==
- "Reefer Madness" – Lecturer, Parents, Zombie Ensemble
- "Romeo and Juliet" – Jimmy, Mary
- "The Stuff" – Mae
- "Down at the Ol' Five and Dime" – Mary, Miss Poppy, Lecturer, Youth Ensemble
- "Jimmy Takes a Hit/ The Orgy" – Sally, Jimmy, Jack, Mae, Ralph, Exotic Ensemble
- "Lonely Pew" – Mary, Lecturer (Organist), Ensemble
- "Listen to Jesus, Jimmy" – Jesus Christ, Joan of Arc and Arc-ettes, Satan, Heaven Ensemble
- "Mary Jane/Mary Lane" – Jimmy, Mary, Full Company (Mae, Jack, Singing Clams, Miss Poppy, Dead Old Man, Officer Sordelet, Jesus, Joan, Satan, Ralph, Sally, Asian Man)
- "The Brownie Song" – (animated) Jimmy, Mae, Sally, Jack, Ralph
- "Little Mary Sunshine" – Ralph, Mary
- "Mary's Death" – Jimmy, Mary
- "Murder!" – Jimmy, Ralph, Mary, Satan, Sally, Jack, Mae, Zombies Ensemble
- "The Stuff (Reprise)" – Mae
- "Tell 'Em the Truth" (Finale) – Mae, Jimmy, Lecturer (FDR), Mary, Jack, Sally, Ralph, Prisoner Ensemble
- "Romeo and Juliet (Reprise)" (Finale) – Mary, Jimmy
- "Reefer Madness (Finale)" – Company
- "Reefer Madness (End Credits)" – Full Cast
- "Mary Lane (End Credits)" – Mary, Jimmy, Company

A soundtrack CD was first released by Showtime in their "stash box" press package. Mixed from the 5.1 audio masters, this version has several anomalies including a few sound effects.

On October 28, 2008, Ghostlight Records released a double CD of the film soundtrack and the original Los Angeles cast recording. The night before, The Public Theater's Joe's Pub hosted a release party concert featuring a four-person ensemble and leads Cumming, Gasteyer, Campbell, Kassir, Torti, Spanger, and Jenna Leigh Green doing an abbreviated concert version with introductions to each song by Kevin Murphy.

The two versions of the soundtrack differ in quite a few places, both from each other and from the film, but it is most noticeable during the song Murder!. The Showtime CD features a longer version, sans all spoken dialogue. The Ghostlight CD features a truncated version of the track littered with dialogue from the film.

== Production ==
In 1998, writing partners Kevin Murphy and Dan Studney, who had met while studying at Drew University in Madison, New Jersey, were driving from Oakland to Los Angeles and listening to Frank Zappa's Joe's Garage, when they began discussing how one might stage the piece. "So I started picturing it in my head," Studney recalls. "Frank Zappa's concept of a musical and then it just hit me. I turned to Kevin and said 'What about doing Reefer Madness as a musical?'" By the time duo reached L.A., they had already written the first song.

The high school is named after Harry J. Anslinger, the first Commissioner of the U.S. Bureau of Narcotics, known as the Father of the Drug War.

== Release ==
Reefer Madness premiered at the 2005 Sundance Film Festival. It also screened in competition at the 2005 Deauville Film Festival and won the Premiere Audience Award. On April 20, four days following the initial television premiere, Showtime aired the musical back-to-back with the 1936 exploitation film that inspired it.

A limited theatrical release occurred internationally in the Czech Republic and Slovakia, wherein the film grossed $8,972 in its short run.

== Reception ==
On the review aggregator website Rotten Tomatoes, 75% of 8 critics' reviews are positive, with an average rating of 7.2/10.

=== Accolades ===
The film won the 2005 Emmy Award for Music and Lyrics (for "Mary Jane/Mary Lane", written specially for the film, and later incorporated into future stage productions). It also received Emmy nominations for Choreography and Make-Up Effects.

=== Home media ===
Showtime released the DVD on November 9, 2005. The DVD includes the original film and an audio commentary by director Fickman with several cast members. It was released on Blu-ray on June 30, 2009, including a German-language dub.

It some territories, it can be downloaded or streamed in HD via Vudu, Redbox, Amazon, Google Play, Microsoft, and YouTube.
