= Top of the Heap =

American sitcom

- Genre: Sitcom
- Created by: Ron Leavitt; Arthur Silver
- Starring: Joseph Bologna; Matt LeBlanc; Joey Lauren Adams; Rita Moreno; Leslie Jordan
- Opening theme: "Puttin' On the Ritz" performed by Kenny Yarbrough
- Composers: Michael Andreas; Kelly Brown
- Country of origin: United States
- Original language: English
- No. of seasons: 1
- No. of episodes: 6 (7 including pilot)

Production
- Executive producers: Arthur Silver; Ron Leavitt
- Running time: 22 minutes
- Production companies: ELP Communications; Columbia Pictures Television

Original release
- Network: Fox
- Release: April 7 – May 19, 1991

Related
- Vinnie & Bobby; Married... with Children

Top of the Heap is an American sitcom that ran for seven episodes on Fox from April 7 until May 19, 1991, the most successful (as it was the only one to make it to series) of three attempted spin-offs of Married... with Children that started as backdoor pilots (the other two being Radio Free Trumaine and Enemies). The pilot was episode 20 of the fifth season of Married... with Children. The series aired on Sundays at 9:30 p.m.

== Synopsis ==
Top of the Heap focused on the attempts of two minor Married... with Children characters—Charlie Verducci (Joseph Bologna) and his son Vinnie (Matt LeBlanc)—to get rich. Charlie's "master plan" is for Vinnie to marry into a wealthy family; to this end, the two Chicago slum residents try to get into high society. Vinnie also owns a cat, Mr. Fluffy, who is despised by Charlie. Mona Mullins (Joey Lauren Adams) is a girl from the Verduccis' neighborhood who has a crush on Vinnie, who tries to fend her off. Alixandra Stone (Rita Moreno) is the manager of a country club, and the object of Charlie's affections. Vinnie gets a job at a country club, which also employs a security guard, Emmet Lefebvre.

In some episodes actors from Married... with Children made guest appearances as their characters from the show, thus reinforcing the connection between the two series. Al Bundy (Ed O'Neill) appeared in the pilot (which itself was an episode of Married... with Children), Bud Bundy (David Faustino) made an appearance in an episode in the country club, and Kelly Bundy (Christina Applegate) appeared twice on the show in cameo appearances.

In 1992, there was a continuation of this series entitled Vinnie & Bobby; it also lasted for only seven episodes. The only characters returning in this version were the eponymous Vinnie (Matt LeBlanc), Mona Mullins (Joey Lauren Adams) and Bobby Grazzo (Robert Torti), who only appeared in the last episode of Top of the Heap.

== Characters ==
Actor	Role	Appearances in other shows	Episodes appeared
Joseph Bologna	Charlie Verducci	2 of Married... with Children	1–7
Matt LeBlanc	Vinnie Verducci	10, three episodes of Married... with Children, all of Vinnie & Bobby	1–7
Joey Lauren Adams	Mona Mullins	8, three episodes of Married... with Children, all of Vinnie & Bobby	1–7
Mr. Fluffy the Cat	Mr. Fluffy the Cat	1 episode of Married... with Children	1–7
Rita Moreno	Alixandra Stone	—N/a	2, 4–7
Leslie Jordan	Emmet Lefebvre	—N/a	2, 4–7
Christina Applegate	Kelly Bundy	255 of Married... with Children	3, 5
David Faustino	Bud Bundy	257 of Married... with Children	2
Ed O'Neill	Al Bundy	259, all of Married... with Children	1
Robert Torti	Bobby Grazzo	7, all of Vinnie & Bobby	7
Note: This table counts the backdoor pilot on Married... with Children as both the first episode and as an appearance on another show.

== Episodes ==
=== Backdoor pilot (1991) ===
No. overall	No. in season	Title	Directed by	Written by	Original release date
100	20	"Top of the Heap"	Gerry Cohen	Ron Leavitt & Arthur Silver	April 7, 1991
Pilot episode: After Vinnie loses his last boxing match (and Charlie wins Al's TV in a bet), Charlie comes up with a plan to get Vinnie to marry a rich woman, so they crash a high society party. Guest appearance by Ed O'Neill as Al Bundy. Originally an episode of Married... with Children, and retains the opening theme of that show ("Love and Marriage" by Frank Sinatra) rather than Puttin' on the Ritz

=== Season 1 (1991) ===
No.	Title	Directed by	Written by	Original release date
1	"The Agony and the Agony"	Linda Day	Mike Scully & Lenny Ripps	April 14, 1991
Vinnie gets a job working at a country club as an assistant to the manager, and Charlie gets the hots for her. Guest appearance by David Faustino as Bud Bundy. First appearance of both Alixandra and Emmet, as well as the show's theme song and opening credits, "Puttin' on the Ritz"
2	"Behind the Eight Ball"	Linda Day	Kimberly Young	April 21, 1991
Charlie overhears that a guy he is hustling at pool is a godfather. Guest appearance by Christina Applegate as Kelly Bundy.
3	"Stocks and Bondages"	Linda Day	Jonathan Collier	April 28, 1991
A hot stock tip sends Charlie to a loan shark, where he gets $10,000, but Vinnie doesn't get the money invested.
4	"The Last Temptation of Charlie"	Gerry Cohen	Lenny Ripps & Arthur Silver	May 5, 1991
Charlie has a hard time convincing Vinnie that he didn't sell their cat, Mr. Fluffy, to pay for the television he claims to have won. Guest appearance by Christina Applegate as Kelly Bundy.
5	"The Marrying Guy"	Tony Singletary	Jonathan Collier & Wayne Kline & Mike Scully & Kimberly Young	May 12, 1991
Vinnie meets his first girlfriend on her wedding day, but Vinnie catches the groom with another woman.
6	"Mona by Moonlight"	Tony Singletary	Kimberly Young & Mike Scully & Wayne Kline & Jonathan Collier	May 19, 1991
Vinnie must take the owner's stepdaughter (a high fashion model) to a prom held at the club, but Mona also wants Vinnie to take her. Guest appearance by Robert Torti as Bobby Grazzo. Last Appearances of Charlie, Alixandra, Emmet and Fluffy. The series would continue in Vinnie & Bobby.
