= Hellblazers =

- Promotional release poster
- Directed by: Justin Lee
- Written by: Justin Lee
- Produced by: Daemon Hillin; Melanie Young; Justin Lee
- Starring: Bruce Dern; Billy Zane; Tony Todd; Adrienne Barbeau
- Music by: Christopher Cano
- Distributed by: Tubi
- Release date: January 21, 2022
- Running time: 84 minutes
- Country: United States
- Language: English

Hellblazers is a 2022 American action horror film directed by Justin Lee, and starring Bruce Dern, Billy Zane, Tony Todd and Adrienne Barbeau.

== Plot ==
Set in the late 1980s, a satanic cult has a singular focus of unleashing hell on Earth. With the help of an ancient incantation, they conjure a demon, and its members are tasked with feeding it the populace of a nearby small southwestern town.

== Cast ==
- Bruce Dern as Bill Unger
- Billy Zane as Joshua
- Tony Todd as Harry
- Adrienne Barbeau as Georgia
- John Kassir as Rick
- Meg Foster as Mary
- Courtney Gains as Bernard
- Danielle Gross as Deanna
- Crash Buist as Teddy
- Ed Morrone as Joe Anderson
- Paige Sturges as Liz

== Production ==
Filming occurred in California and wrapped in February 2020.

== Release ==
The film was released on Tubi on January 21, 2022.
