= The Last Godfather =

- Film poster
- Directed by: Shim Hyung-rae
- Written by: Shim Hyung-rae
- Produced by: Choi Dooho; Choi Sung-ho; Lee Sang-moo
- Starring: Shim Hyung-rae
- Cinematography: Mark Irwin
- Edited by: Jeff Freeman
- Music by: John Lissauer
- Production company: Younggu Art
- Distributed by: CJ Entertainment
- Release date: October 29, 2010 (South Korea)
- Running time: 103 minutes
- Country: South Korea
- Language: English

The Last Godfather (Korean: 라스트 갓파더) is a 2010 mafia comedy film directed by Shim Hyung-rae.

== Synopsis ==
Yong-Gu (Shim Hyung-rae) is the illegitimate child of the infamous mafia boss Don Carini (Harvey Keitel), who is based in New York. Carini shocks everyone by stating that he wants Yong-Gu to take over the operation, something that seems to be a bad choice when the man in question shows himself to be a poor candidate to be a mafia don.

== Cast ==
- Shim Hyung-rae as Young-Gu
- Harvey Keitel as Don Carini
- Blake Clark as Captain O'Brian
- Michael Rispoli as Tony "Tony V"
- Jason Mewes as Vinnie
- Jocelin Donahue as Nancy Bonfante
- Jon Polito as Don Bonfante
- Michele Specht as Burlesque Hostess
- John Pinette as "Macho"
- Paul Hipp as Rocco
- Josh Rosenthal as Fabrizio
- Debra Mooney as Sister Theresa
- Jack Kehler as Cabbie

== Reception ==
The Los Angeles Times and The National both panned The Last Godfather, and the Los Angeles Times wrote that the film was "more harmlessly amiable than outright awful, though it might still be best to just forget about it."
