= John Pinette =

American comedian and actor (1964–2014)

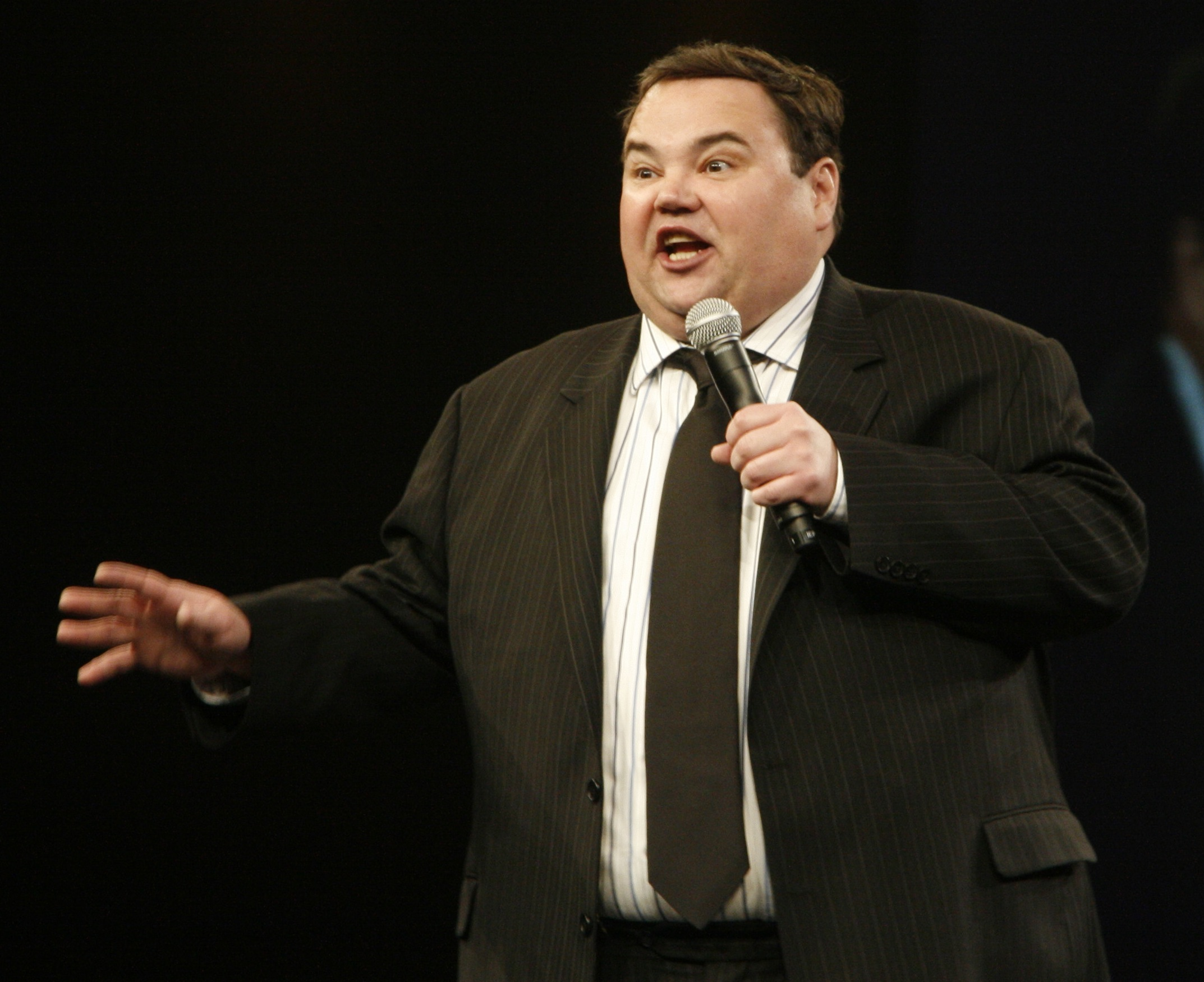
- Pinette in 2010
- Born: John Paul Pinette; March 23, 1964; Boston, Massachusetts, U.S.
- Died: April 5, 2014 (aged 50); Pittsburgh, Pennsylvania, U.S.
- Education: University of Massachusetts Lowell (BS)

Comedy career
- Medium: Stand-up; television; film
- Genre: Observational comedy
- Subjects: Impressions; self-deprecation; everyday life; obesity; world travel; food

John Paul Pinette (/pɪˈnɛt/ pi-NET; March 23, 1964 – April 5, 2014) was an American stand-up comedian, actor, and Broadway performer. He toured the comedy club circuit beginning in the 1980s and appeared in cinema and on television. Besides stand-up, Pinette did various impressions, among them Michael Jackson, The Chipmunks, Elvis Presley, Gollum from The Lord of the Rings, Hervé Villechaize (Tattoo from Fantasy Island), an Ewok, actor Marlon Brando (notably Brando's role in The Godfather), as well as a range of regional accents. He occasionally sang in his stand-up routines, working in songs such as "Over the Rainbow" from The Wizard of Oz, "Will You Be There" from Free Willy, and "Don't Cry for Me Argentina".

A graduate of the University of Massachusetts Lowell, Pinette was originally an accountant before he chose to pursue a career in comedy on the advice of his friends. He had an early break in 1991 when he opened for Frank Sinatra's shows. The following year, he was cast in the television shows Parker Lewis Can't Lose and Vinnie & Bobby. In 1998, he would record and release his first CD, Show Me the Buffet, and appear in the finale of Seinfeld.

Pinette would go on to star in dozens of films and TV shows including, Junior (1994), Dear God (1996), Simon Sez (1999), Duets (2000), The Punisher (2004), and The Last Godfather (2010). He would also star in the Broadway musical Hairspray as Edna Turnblad in 2004, and host the TV series All You Can Eat on H2. In 1999, he was named Stand-Up Comedian of the Year by the American Comedy Awards and was nominated for a Gemini Award.

== Early life ==
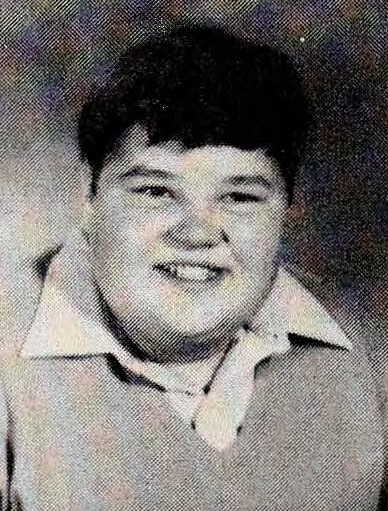
Pinette's sophomore yearbook photo at Malden Catholic High School

Pinette was born in Boston, Massachusetts, on March 23, 1964, the son of Robert Pinette Sr. (1929–1988) and Louise Pinette (née Petrie; 1927–1982). He graduated from Malden Catholic High School in 1982. During his time there, he partook in the Massachusetts high school drama festival, where he was named to the All-State cast for his excellency in acting. In 1986, he graduated from the University of Massachusetts Lowell with a degree in accounting.

== Career ==
After graduating, he worked in accounting but, after just six months, and on the advice of friends, left to pursue a career in comedy, telling the Montreal Gazette in 2006 that he "knew the book theory but [he] didn't have the heart for it" and that "[his] job was to distract the auditors with jokes".

An early break for Pinette occurred in 1991 when he was asked to open for Frank Sinatra, doing so on and off for a year and a half. Originally hired to perform three sets, Sinatra invited him to dinner and chose to keep him on for more shows, including one at the Desert Inn in Las Vegas.

That same year, he was cast in the reality show The Grudge Match as the referee on the series and had regular roles on the final season of teen sitcom Parker Lewis Can't Lose and the Married... with Children second-generation spin-off Vinnie & Bobby, both airing in 1992.

He was a recurring guest on The Tonight Show and The View, and in 1998 played the carjacking victim in the final episode of the sitcom Seinfeld.

Pinette was named Stand-Up Comedian of the Year by the American Comedy Awards in 1999 and received a Gemini Award nomination for his televised performance at Montreal's Just for Laughs Comedy Festival in 2000. He held the record for the highest-selling one-person show series in the history of Just for Laughs for 16 years, being surpassed by Sugar Sammy in 2016.

Pinette appeared in the films Duets, Simon Sez, The Last Godfather, Dear God, and Junior, and played Nathaniel Bumpo in Artisan Entertainment's 2004 film The Punisher, starring Thomas Jane and John Travolta.

In 2004, he joined the touring cast of the musical Hairspray in the role of Edna Turnblad, remarking to The Globe and Mail that "The irony is having to work my ass off six days a week on the treadmill in order to play a fat old woman." He later went on to the Broadway production in 2005, and continued in the role until May 28, 2006. In his 2006 concert I'm Starvin', he said that was the first musical theater production he had been in since high school.

Pinette was on board the cruise ship MS Monarch (formerly Monarch of the Seas) during a grounding incident off the coast of St. Maarten, referencing it in his 2005 DVD special I Say Nay Nay.

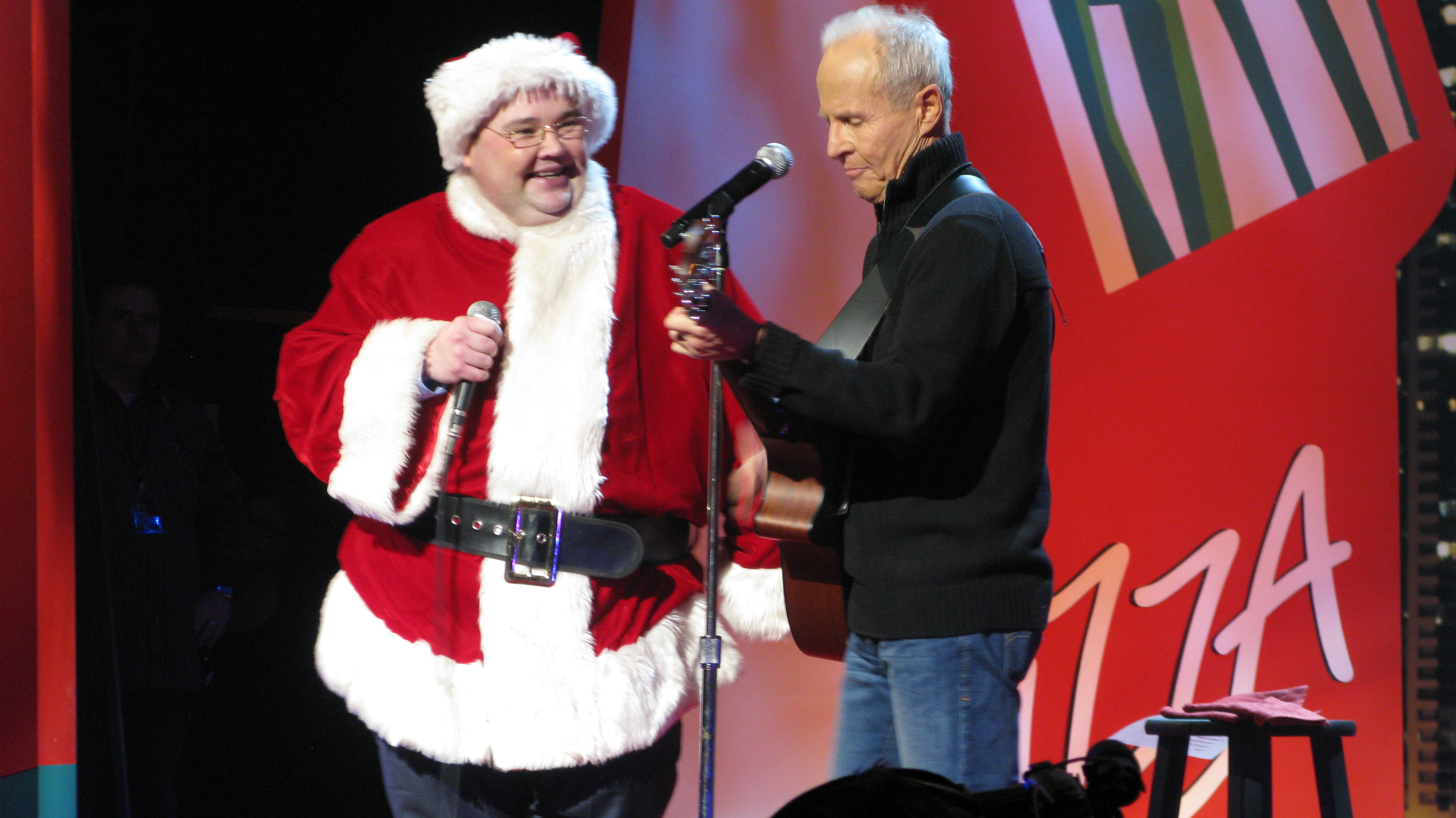
Pinette (left) performing with Elmo Shropshire (right) in December, 2010

Pinette's stand-up material was featured in Comedy Central's 2004 animated series Shorties Watchin' Shorties. In 2007, Pinette performed at the 42nd annual Jerry Lewis MDA Telethon. He performed at the Edinburgh Comedy Festival in Edinburgh, Scotland, in 2008, and toured in cities in 2010 beginning in April. During this tour, Pinette recorded a Comedy Central special titled John Pinette: Still Hungry. The taping took place at the Vic Theatre in Chicago and the world premiere of Still Hungry was on July 29, 2011, on Comedy Central.

In 2012, he was one of the comedy acts in Ron White's Comedy Salute to the Troops on CMT.

He was the host of All You Can Eat, a TV series taking a humorous look at American cuisine. The show debuted on the H2 network in the United States in late June 2013.

In August 2013, Pinette cancelled a nationwide tour of Canada and checked into a rehabilitation facility after developing a dependency on prescription pain medication, telling his fans on Twitter the following January that he was "physically spent" after "losing a bunch of weight and several small surgical procedures" and would be taking three-and-a-half months off to recover. He later resumed touring the U.S. comedy circuit in March, performing shows in California.

== Style and influences ==
Pinette often turned to his experiences with his weight as a key element of his comedy and challenges posed by his size in everyday life became a regular source of humour on stage alongside his takes on different foods and regional cuisines.

When explaining his approach to stand-up comedy onstage, in interviews, and on social media, Pinette often, though sometimes only partially, restated a mantra: "I talk about my life, it's the funniest thing I can think of. For some reason, people enjoy seeing me lose my cherub-like demeanor."

Pinette cited Jackie Gleason, Jonathan Winters, Buddy Hackett, and Bill Cosby as the main comedians that shaped him as a comic. In response to critics of his chosen subject, he stated in 1998: "Why should that be any different from a comic that says, 'I was an alcoholic,' or, 'I was in a bad relationship'? I want to talk about being a big guy... it's not a fat joke. It's a joke about living the way you live."

Chortle founder Steve Bennett described the experience of watching Pinette's I Say Nay Nay set at the Edinburgh Fringe in 2008 by saying: "It's not until you leave the show and get your breath back that you realise that you have learned nothing, no boundary has been pushed, no preconception questioned. There is no theme, no grand point other than to make the audience laugh hard and laugh solidly, and Pinette hammers this point home masterfully."

The Guardian wrote in 2012: "Yes, Pinette is indeed a fat man making fat jokes, which may seem to you a touch predictable, yet the joy of his comedy is in his superb technique", describing him as "a comic fantasist instead of an observer".

== Personal life ==
Pinette readily shared details of his weight journey both on stage as part of his act and in interviews, with his weight fluctuating dramatically throughout his life from a high of 452 pounds in the late 1990s to a low of 225 pounds in the time before his death, having undergone gastric-bypass surgery in 1999 due to health concerns.

In preparation to meet the demands of his Broadway role in Hairspray, Pinette lost 100 pounds from his high (something he did several times during his career) and wore a fat suit on stage. In his comedy show Still Hungry, Pinette detailed how he was diagnosed with a wheat allergy.

When asked in 1998 by the Las Vegas Sun what would be on his plate if he could build his own buffet, in reference to the central theme of his then-touring comedy show Show Me The Buffet, Pinette responded: "There's a lot of life out there; you can grab and move."

As of October 2006, he had moved to Pennsylvania to live part-time in close proximity to his family, in between periods he spent touring.

== Death ==
Pinette's grave in SS. Peter and Paul Cemetery, Springfield, Pennsylvania in August, 2026

Pinette died on April 5, 2014, at the age of 50, in Pittsburgh, Pennsylvania, where he had been attending a family wedding. Pinette's personal doctor determined the cause of death to be pulmonary embolism. Pinette's funeral services were held near his home in Springfield, Pennsylvania.

In a memorandum following his death, Just For Laughs revealed that it had been working with Pinette's team in preparation for another cross-Canada tour that would have been centered on a belated 25th anniversary celebration of his 28-year-long career in stand-up, highlighting his most famous catchphrases and routines, with the festival organizers going on to describe him as "a master of his craft and a true legend".

== Discography ==
- Show Me the Buffet (CD, 1998)
- I Say Nay Nay (DVD, 2005)
- I'm Starvin'! (DVD, 2006)
- Making Lite of Myself (CD, 2007)
- Still Hungry (DVD/CD, 2011)

== Filmography ==
=== Films ===
Year	Title	Role	Notes
1990	Thanksgiving Day	Delivery person	Television film
1992	Revenge of the Nerds III: The Next Generation	Trevor Gulf	Television film
1993	Reckless Kelly	Sam Delance	Feature film
1994	Junior	Clerk	Feature film
1995	Hart to Hart: Secrets of the Hart		Television film
1996	Dear God	Junior	Feature film
1999	Simon Sez	Micro	Feature film
2000	Duets	John	Feature film
2000	My 5 Wives	Stewart	Feature film
2002	Do It for Uncle Manny	Sammy Levine	Feature film
2003	Piece a' Cake	Sammy	Short film
2004	The Punisher	Bumpo	Feature film
2010	The Last Godfather	Macho	Feature film

=== Television series ===
Year	Title	Role	Notes
1988	Smart Guys	Nick Byrd	Television series; episode: "Pilot"
1990	ALF	Howie Anderson	Television series; episode: "Make 'em Laugh"
1991	The Grudge Match	Himself (referee)	Game show
1991	Studio 59	Various roles	Television series
1992	Vinnie & Bobby	William Melvin Belli	Television series; 7 episodes
1992–1993	Parker Lewis Can't Lose	Coach Hank Kohler	Television series; 15 episodes
1995–1996	High Tide	Bob-O DiBella	Television series; 4 episodes
1998	Dr. Katz, Professional Therapist	John	Television series; voice; episode: "Phone Luv"
1998	Life's Work	John the Bellhop	Television series; episode: "Pregnancy"
1998	Seinfeld	Howie	Television series; episode: "The Finale"
2013	All You Can Eat	Himself (host)	Television series; 19 episodes

=== Video games ===
Year	Title	Role	Notes
2013	Impire	Ba'al-Abaddon	Video game; voice

== See also ==
- List of stand-up comedians
