= Robert Torti =

American actor (born 1961)

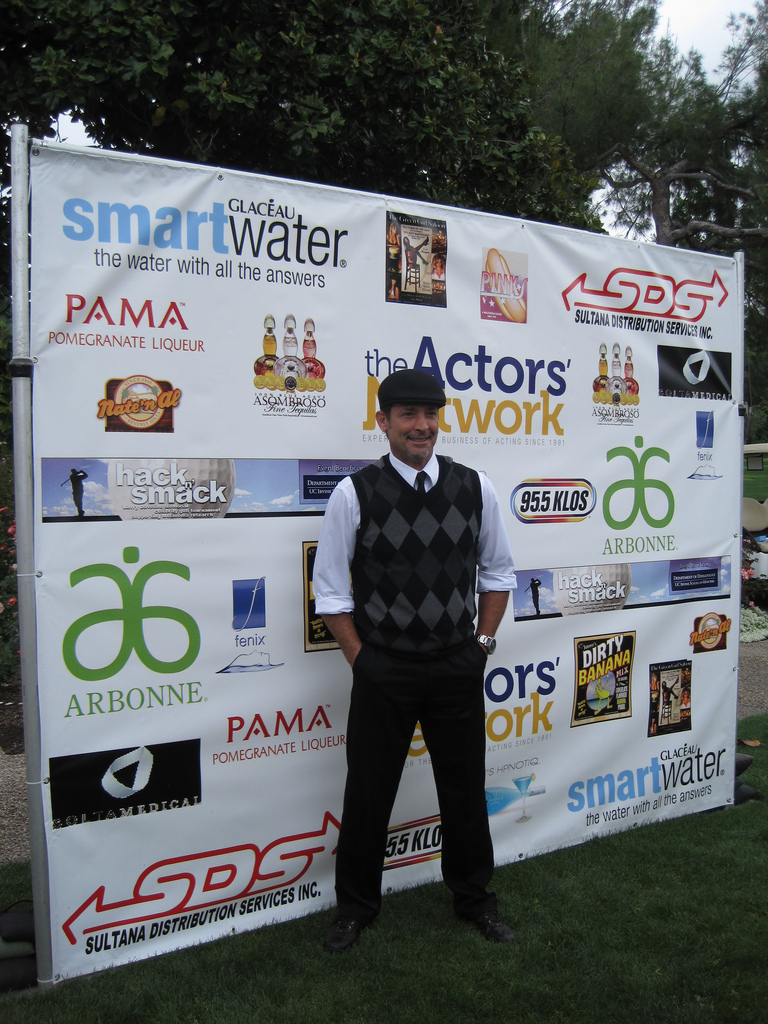
- Torti at the 2011 Hack n' Smack Celebrity Golf Tournament
- Born: Robert Felix Torti; October 22, 1961 (age 64); Van Nuys, California, U.S.
- Occupation: Actor
- Years active: 1980–present
- Spouse: DeLee Lively (m. 1999)
- Children: 4

Robert Felix Torti (born October 22, 1961) is an American actor.

Torti was honored with a Tony Award nomination for his Broadway debut as Greaseball in Starlight Express (1984). He returned to Broadway as the Pharaoh in the 1993 revival of Joseph and the Amazing Technicolor Dreamcoat, a role he reprised in the 1999 film adaptation. Torti originated the roles of Jesus and Jack in the (1998) Los Angeles and (2001) New York City stage productions of the musical Reefer Madness. He also appeared in the London and Los Angeles productions of Smokey Joe's Cafe.

On screen, Torti appeared in the Tom Hanks film That Thing You Do! as singer Freddy Fredrickson. Other film credits include Who's Your Daddy, Submerged, and Reefer Madness: The Movie Musical.

Torti has appeared in regular and recurring television roles on series such as The Drew Carey Show, Vinnie & Bobby, Generations, The Young and the Restless, The Suite Life of Zack & Cody, and The Suite Life on Deck

In August 2020, Torti was featured on the soundtrack Broadway Sings Blood Rock: The Musical with Andy Mientus, Damon Daunno, and Jennifer DiNoia.

== Personal life ==
Torti was born in Van Nuys, California. He married DeLee Lively on June 24, 1999. Together they have four children, three daughters and one son.

== Filmography ==
- Quincy, M.E. (1980) (Lance Sullivan)
- Little House on the Prairie (1981) (Stefano Gambini)
- Alley Cat (1984) (Johnny)
- Throb (1987) (Fabian)
- P.I. Private Investigations (1987) (Burglar)
- Family Ties (1989) (Jack)
- Father Dowling Mysteries (1989) (Sean)
- One of the Boys (1989) (Jack)
- Generations (1989) (Lt. Kyle Masters)
- Quantum Leap (1989) (Jimmy Giovani)
- Out of This World (1990) (Flash)
- Top of the Heap (1991) (Bobby Grazzo)
- She-Wolf of London (1991) (Larabee Link)
- Murder, She Wrote (1992) (Damian Bolo)
- Vinnie & Bobby (1992) (Bobby Grazzo)
- The Fresh Prince of Bel-Air (1992) (Frank)
- Days of Our Lives (1993) (Charlie Van Dieter)
- Hangin' with Mr. Cooper (1993)
- Melrose Place (1995) (Jim Stone)
- The Drew Carey Show (1995–2001) (Jay Clemens / Nick)
- That Thing You Do! (1996) (Freddy Fredrickson)
- The Guardian (1997) (Pintor)
- Honey, I Shrunk the Kids: The TV Show (1997)
- Beverly Hills, 90210 (1997) (Everett Sands)
- Clueless (1998) (Joe Pizzulo)
- Joseph and the Amazing Technicolor Dreamcoat (1999) (Pharaoh)
- Good vs. Evil (2000) (Joey Dimarcola)
- Cover Me (2000) (Mr. Zito)
- Submerged (2000) (Dr. Frank Ewing)
- Any Day Now (2001) (Stage Manager)
- Spyder Games (2001) (Jimmy)
- Sabrina, the Teenage Witch (2001) (Even Steven)
- V.I.P. (2001) (Jeremy Harmetz)
- Hey Arnold! (2002) (Voices)
- Do Over (2002) (Bobby Kindler)
- The Young and the Restless (2003–2004) (Salvatore Staley)
- Quintuplets (2004) (Jake)
- Reefer Madness: The Movie Musical (2005) (Jesus)
- The Suite Life of Zack & Cody (2005–2008) (Kurt Martin, 5 episodes)
- Numb3rs (2005) (Arthur Rimbelli)
- She's the Man (2006) (Coach Pistonek)
- Players' Club (2006) (video short)
- The Game Plan (2007) (Samuel Blake)
- Half Past Dead 2 (2007) (Assistant Warden)
- Monk
- Lovely Evening (2009) (Lucy)
- Race to Witch Mountain (2009) (Jack's Boss Dominick)
- The Suite Life on Deck (2009-2011) (Kurt Martin)
- Criminal Minds (2017) (Sheriff Scott Paseo)

== Theater ==
- Little Fish (as Robert)
- Jesus Christ Superstar (as Judas)
- Godspell (as Jesus)
- West Side Story (as Bernardo)
- Grease (as Danny)
- To Sir with Love (as Santo)
- Starlight Express (as Greaseball)
- Joseph and the Amazing Technicolour Dreamcoat (as Pharaoh)
- Smokey Joe's Cafe (as Bob)
- The Gift (as Don)
- Sneaux (as Larry, Bob)
- Reefer Madness (as Jesus, Jack)
- Rock of Ages (as Hertz)

== Accolades ==
- Nominated as Best Featured Actor in a Musical at the 41st Tony Awards for Starlight Express.
- Drama-Logue Award winner for his performance in Godspell.
- Ovation Award winner for his performance in Reefer Madness.
