= Submerged (2000 film) =

- DVD cover
- Directed by: Fred Olen Ray (as Ed Raymond)
- Written by: Steve Latshaw
- Produced by: Alison Semenza; Jim Wynorski (as Noble Henry)
- Starring: Coolio; Nicole Eggert
- Cinematography: Thomas L. Callaway
- Edited by: Michael Kuge
- Release date: October 24, 2000
- Running time: 95 minutes
- Country: United States
- Language: English

Submerged is a 2000 American direct-to-video action disaster thriller film directed by Fred Olen Ray and starring Coolio and Nicole Eggert. The film follows a group of people who become trapped in a plane underwater after their pilot purposefully crash lands them in the ocean for reasons concerning a missile-destroying satellite that one of the passengers owns.

== Plot ==
The Thunderstrike, a satellite designed to destroy missiles before they hit their target, is launched into space. Buck Stevens, the owner of the satellite, his daughter Tiffany, Tiffany's estranged boyfriend Kevin Thomas, who's also the designer of the satellite, security advisor Frank Ewing, and Judy Campbell, Buck's pregnant employee, are flying to Hawaii for further tests on a private Boeing 747-100. CIA agent Jim Carpenter is hired to escort them to Hawaii. The pilot of the flight is killed, and is replaced by his murderer Richard Layton. As the 747 takes off, Layton kills the copilot, and crashes the 747 into the ocean. It sinks to the ocean floor, and a crew member is killed in the chaos, although all of the passengers survive. A group of divers then arrive, led by Jeff Cort, although they're revealed to be Layton's accomplices who plan on stealing the computer that will be used to launch the Thunderstrike in the cargo hold. Cort betrays Layton, and fatally shoots him with a spear, and also shoots Jim. The divers then leave along with Ewing, who is Cort's accomplice. They then begin to fly back to the mansion of arms dealer Owen Cantrell, although during the flight, Cantrell betrays Cort by fatally shooting him.

Meanwhile, ATF agent Wendy Robbins tracks down Cantrell's accomplice Karen, although Karen escapes, resulting in a car chase that ends with Karen's car crashing. Karen escapes, although Wendy, and her colleague Mack Taylor believe her to be dead. Back on the 747, the others tend to Jim's wound, as well as Judy who is going into premature labor due to the accident. The group manages to send an emergency beacon to the surface, which reaches a nearby US Navy aircraft carrier. Taylor arrives on the aircraft carrier to assist a team of divers who dive down into the 747 to help the survivors. The captain of the ship, Masters, soon initiates a rescue operation where the 747 will be lifted by attaching large balloons to the sides of the 747. While the 747 is being lifted, Judy gives birth to a baby boy, and most of the group is rescued. However, the balloons begin to break, and the 747 sinks back down into the ocean, taking Buck with it, devastating Tiffany. Jim begins a relationship with Judy afterwards. In the meantime, Cantrell and Ewing find Karen, and the trio arrive at Cantrell's mission. Taylor flies back to land in order to assist in the raid of the mansion. Cantrell, Ewing, and Karen attempt to use Thunderstrike to blow up various locations, although the group flees when Taylor fights his way inside. Taylor manages to stop the firing sequence, Cantrell, Ewing, and Karen attempt to escape in a truck. However, Taylor goes back outside, and kills Cantrell, Ewing, and Karen by exploding the truck with a bazooka. The ATF then retrieves the computer device. Taylor begins a relationship with Wendy.

== Cast ==
- Coolio as Jeff Cort, a man assisting in the raid of the Thunderstrike launch computer.
- Maxwell Caulfield as ATF Agent Jim Carpenter, an ATF agent who has recently lost his family.
- Nicole Eggert as Tiffany Stevens, Buck's stubborn daughter.
- Brent Huff as ATF Agent Mack Taylor, Jim's colleague.
- Fredric Lehne as Richard Layton, a man who's part of the computer raid.
- Dennis Weaver as Buck Stevens, Tiffany's father, and the owner of the Thunderstrike.
- Hannes Jaenicke as Dr. Kevin Thomas, the designer of the Thunderstrike, and Tiffany's estranged boyfriend.
- Fred Williamson as Captain Masters, the captain of a battleship that leads the rescue of the passengers.
- Tim Thomerson as Owen Cantrell, a marine colonel turned arms dealer who's the leader of the computer raid.
- Robert Torti as Dr. Frank Ewing, a member of security for the Thunderstrike who's secretly part of the computer raid.
- Yvette Nipar as ATF Agent Wendy Robbins, an ATF agent who's attempting to track down Cantrell.
- Stacey Travis as Cindy Kenner, the stewardess of the flight.
- Art Hindle as ATF Agent Sam, Jim and Taylor's boss.
- Meredyth Hunt as Judy Campbell, a pregnant employee of Buck.
- Michael B. Silver as Dr. Wilson, a doctor who assists in the rescue of the passengers.
- Meliani Paul as Karen, Cantrell's accomplice.
- Michael Bailey Smith as Lieutenant Nick Stuart, one of Masters' lieutenants who assists in the rescue of the passengers.

== Reception ==
The film received a negative review at the Dutch website Cinemagazine, while the French B-movie website Nanarland stated, "The imperturbable conviction of the actors brings a high sympathy coefficient to their characters, who are also so stereotypical that they become paradoxically endearing."
