= Kevin Murphy (screenwriter) =

American composer and writer

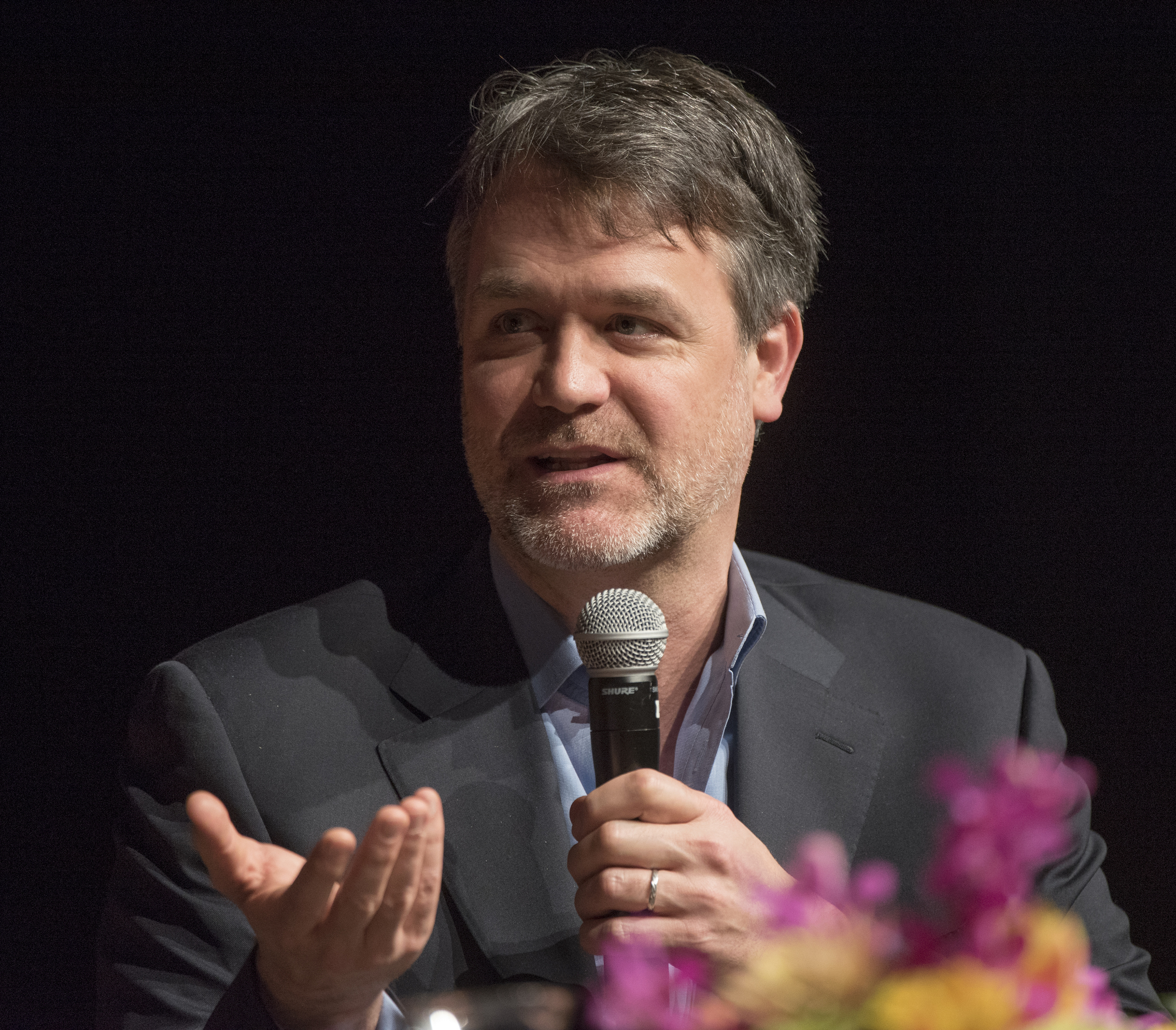
- Murphy in 2017
- Born: November 3, 1966 (age 60); River Forest, Illinois, U.S.
- Education: Drew University
- Occupations: Screenwriter; television producer; lyricist; composer
- Notable work: Reefer Madness; Heathers: The Musical; Desperate Housewives

Kevin Wagner Murphy is an American screenwriter, television producer, lyricist and composer. He wrote the book and lyrics of the musical Reefer Madness, as well as its television adaptation. For television, he has worked as a writer and producer for many series, most notably Desperate Housewives. He also co-wrote the stage musical Heathers: The Musical.

== Television ==
Murphy's television career began as a writer for the family sitcom Big Brother Jake. He went on to write for the animated series Adventures of Sonic the Hedgehog, Sabrina: The Animated Series and Phantom Investigators; the science fiction-themed family programs Weird Science, Honey, I Shrunk the Kids: The TV Show and So Weird; the action series Martial Law; the romantic comedy-dramas Jack & Jill and Ed; and the family dramas Get Real and The O'Keefes. From its premiere in 2004 to 2007, he worked as head writer and co-executive producer for the hit comedy-drama Desperate Housewives. Desperate Housewives was nominated for an Emmy Award in 2005, when Murphy was its head writer.

In 2007, Murphy wrote and produced an original TV movie titled Nobody. In the same year, he worked as a writer and co-executive producer for the supernatural-themed comedy-drama Reaper. He also contributed original songs to Nobody and Reaper. In 2008, Murphy created the short-lived comedy-drama Valentine. In October 2009, Murphy joined the staff of the Battlestar Galactica prequel Caprica. A month later, he became the showrunner for the Syfy drama, taking over from Jane Espenson.

As of 2009, Murphy has been working with Tom Welling to develop the September 2010 series Hellcats television series for The CW, based on the book Cheer: Inside the Secret World of College Cheerleaders by Kate Torgovnick. He was also working on a drama titled Velvet Hammer for USA Network.

Murphy was the producer for the Syfy series Defiance.

From 2017 to 2019, he was the showrunner and writer of The Son on AMC, which ran for two seasons.

== Stage ==
Murphy wrote the lyrics and co-wrote the book for the musical Reefer Madness. It was his third collaboration with writer-composer Dan Studney, but the first to be professionally produced. For the off-Broadway production of Reefer Madness, Murphy was nominated for a Drama Desk Award for "Outstanding Lyrics". In 2005, Murphy and Studney adapted their stage musical for television for Showtime. The song "Mary Jane/Mary Lane", which they composed for the television adaptation, won an Emmy Award for Music and Lyrics.

In 2009, Murphy began developing a musical adaptation of the 1988 film Heathers. Murphy wrote the book and lyrics, and the score was written by Laurence O'Keefe, composer of Legally Blonde: The Musical. Three staged readings of Heathers: The Musical took place, with Kristen Bell in the starring role; the creators hoped for a regional production in 2010, to be followed by a Broadway run in 2011. In 2013, the musical began a run September 21 at the Hudson Backstage Theatre in Los Angeles. The musical then began an Off-Broadway run in March 2014 and closed in August 2014. The musical later had a run at The Other Palace in London from June 2018 to August 2018, before transferring to the Theatre Royal Haymarket for a run from September 2018 to November 2018.

== Personal life ==
Murphy is a graduate of Drew University in Madison, New Jersey.
