= Making Lite of Myself =

Live album by John Pinette
- Released: August 7, 2007
- Genre: Stand-up comedy
- Length: 52:18
- Label: Uproar Entertainment
- Producer: David Drozen

John Pinette chronology
Show Me the Buffet (1998)	Making Lite of Myself (2007)	Still Hungry (2011)

Making Lite of Myself is stand-up comedian John Pinette's second comedy album.

Michael Posner of The Globe and Mail described it as "an hour and 10 minutes of the best fat jokes you'll ever hear."

== Track listing ==
1. "The Gym" – 5:19
2. "Subway Diet" – 1:03
3. "The Herbalist and the Blocked Colon" – 3:40
4. "Low Carb Diets and Dr. Phil" – 2:14
5. "Extreme Sports" – 5:15
6. "Camping" – 8:30
7. "Pennsylvania / Thanksgiving" – 7:16
8. "England" – 4:39
9. "France" – 4:07
10. "Viva El Gordo" – 4:45
11. "Get Outta the Line!" – 4:18
12. "Toilet Paper" – 1:10
