= Amy Spanger =

American actress, singer and dancer (born 1971)

- Born: May 21, 1971 (age 55); Newbury, Massachusetts, U.S.
- Occupations: Actress; singer; dancer
- Years active: 1994–present
- Spouses: Michael C. Hall (m. 2002; div. 2006) Brian Shepard (m. 2011)
- Website: amyspanger.com

Amy Spanger (born May 21, 1971) is an American actress, singer and dancer.

== Early life ==
Spanger was born in Newbury, Massachusetts.

== Career ==
Spanger made her Broadway debut in 1995 in the musical Sunset Boulevard, following a half-year run in the pre-Broadway national tour of Jekyll & Hyde. She originated the role of Lois Lane (Bianca) in the Broadway revival of Kiss Me, Kate. In Chicago she played Roxie Hart, and in Urinetown, Hope Cladwell. In 2006, she originated the role of Holly in The Wedding Singer.

Spanger also appeared in the national touring companies of Rent and Chicago. She originated the role of Susan in the off-Broadway production of the Jonathan Larson musical tick, tick... BOOM!. Other stage credits include: Lunch, and Feeling Electric, which later became Next to Normal, in which she co-starred with actor Anthony Rapp.

She originated the role of Sherrie in the Broadway musical Rock of Ages but took an extended leave from the production in early June 2009, for vocal rest, before permanently departing the production on June 29 for "personal reasons". She more recently originated the role of Jovie in the stage musical adaptation of Will Ferrell's Christmas comedy Elf, that ran on Broadway for nine weeks at the Al Hirschfeld Theatre and closed on January 2, 2011. On September 8, 2015, Spanger joined the Broadway cast of Matilda the Musical as Mrs. Wormwood.

Spanger's television credits include: Ed, Becker, Egg: The Arts Show, Six Feet Under, Law & Order: Special Victims Unit, Michael & Michael Have Issues, and Bored to Death. She also starred in the Showtime original movie musical Reefer Madness (2005), as the promiscuous Sally. She also appeared in Synecdoche, New York (2008), written and directed by Charlie Kaufman.

== Personal life ==
Spanger married actor Michael C. Hall on May 1, 2002. Hall played Billy Flynn opposite Spanger's Roxie Hart in the Broadway musical Chicago the summer after their wedding. The couple separated in 2005 and divorced in 2006.

== Filmography ==
=== Film ===
Year	Title	Role	Notes
2008	Synecdoche, New York	Soap Actress Nurse	
2008	Every Little Step	—N/a	Documentary
2016	No Beast So Fierce	Gina	

=== Television ===
Year	Title	Role	Notes
2001	Ed	Barbara	Episode: "Windows of Opportunity"
2003	Becker	Susan	Episode: "Chris' Ex"
2003	EGG, the Arts Show	Amy Corbett	Episode: "Broadway Workshop"
2003	Traps! The Musical	Amy Corbett	Television film
2005	Reefer Madness: The Movie Musical	Sally DeBains / Statue of Liberty	Television film
2005	Six Feet Under	Holly Duncan	Episode: "Static"
2008, 2016	Law & Order: Special Victims Unit	Helen Turner / Marlene Rosten	2 episodes
2009	Michael & Michael Have Issues	Martha Black	2 episodes
2010	Royal Pains	Kerry	Episode: "Medusa"
2011	Bored to Death	Kitty	2 episodes
2014	Submissions Only	Nina	Episode: "Expectations"
2017	The Blacklist	Tammy Lynn Thompson	Episode: "Smokey Putnum (No. 30)"
2018	Chicago Med	Pam Barker	Episode: "Crisis of Confidence"
