= The Grudge Match =

1991 syndicated television game show

- Genre: Game show
- Created by: Rich Melcombe
- Showrunner: Mark Johnson
- Directed by: Bob Dunphy
- Presented by: Steve Albert and Jesse Ventura
- Starring: Paula McClure, John Pinette
- Announcer: Michael Buffer
- Theme music composer: Michael Cruz
- Country of origin: United States
- Original language: English
- No. of seasons: 1

Production
- Running time: approx. 44 minutes
- Production companies: Richmel Productions, Genesis Entertainment

Original release
- Network: Syndication
- Release: September 7, 1991 – September 6, 1992

The Grudge Match is an American television game show. Contestants with disagreements or "grudges" between each other competed to settle their issues in a boxing ring using various stunts and props. The show was hosted by Steve Albert and Jesse Ventura, with Michael Buffer as the ring announcer, comedian John Pinette as referee, and then-Entertainment Tonight correspondent Paula McClure as a reporter. The Grudge Match aired from September 1991 to September 1992 in broadcast syndication. It was generally met with negative reception for its concept and professional wrestling-inspired themes.

== Development ==
The Grudge Match was created by Rich Melcombe for Richmel Productions in association with Genesis Entertainment. It aired in broadcast syndication from September 7, 1991 to September 6, 1992. The show's hosts were professional wrestler Jesse Ventura and commentator Steve Albert, with Michael Buffer serving as the ring announcer. Further assistance was provided by John Pinette and Paula McClure. In a United Press International article, Albert described the show as "somewhere between 60 Minutes and Super Sloppy Double Dare." Broadcasting & Cable first reported on the show's development in December 1990, and stated that Genesis Entertainment representatives estimated a cost of $120,000 per episode and planned to air 26 episodes. Albert later recalled that producers chose him as co-host after seeing him commentate a match between Mike Tyson and Razor Ruddock despite him being cold and tripping over his lines, as Melcombe appreciated Albert's sense of humor. Producers auditioned contestants by advertising in the Los Angeles Times and searching small-claims courts in California.

== Gameplay ==
Two contestants compete to settle disagreements or "grudges" between each other. For example, one episode features a woman getting revenge on a hairdresser who gave her a bad haircut before her wedding, while the writers of The Encyclopedia of TV Game Shows noted that other "grudges" included a man whose girlfriend accidentally deleted his term paper from his computer. The players' "grudges" are then presented to the audience, and gameplay begins with three rounds each lasting for a minute. The contestants fight each other in a series of rounds held inside a boxing ring. These matches feature comedic props such as oversized boxing gloves, foam swords, and water balloons, as well as themed outfits. After the three rounds are over, the studio audience votes on a winner, who then receives a prize.

== Critical reception ==
The Grudge Match was met with generally negative reviews. Paul Lomartire of the Palm Beach Post called the show "bizarre" and also stated, "[y]ou can be sure the more the show is trashed by TV critics, the bigger the audience." Andee Beck of the Tacoma, Washington, News Tribune published a sarcastic review in which she panned the show's borrowing of attributes from professional wrestling such as ring girls and commentators. The show was also panned by Daniel M. Kimmel of the Worcester, Massachusetts, Telegram & Gazette, who wrote, "What's startling is that adults would agree to appear on television and engage in a food fight in front of an audience."
