= Kutchin =

Kutchin may refer to:

- The Kutchin or Gwichʼin, an Athabaskan-speaking First Nations people of Canada and an Alaska Native people
  - Kutchin language
- Lucius Kutchin (1901–1936), American painter

== See also ==
- Kutchins, a surname
