= Ivy Ma =

Hong Kong visual artist

- 馬琼珠
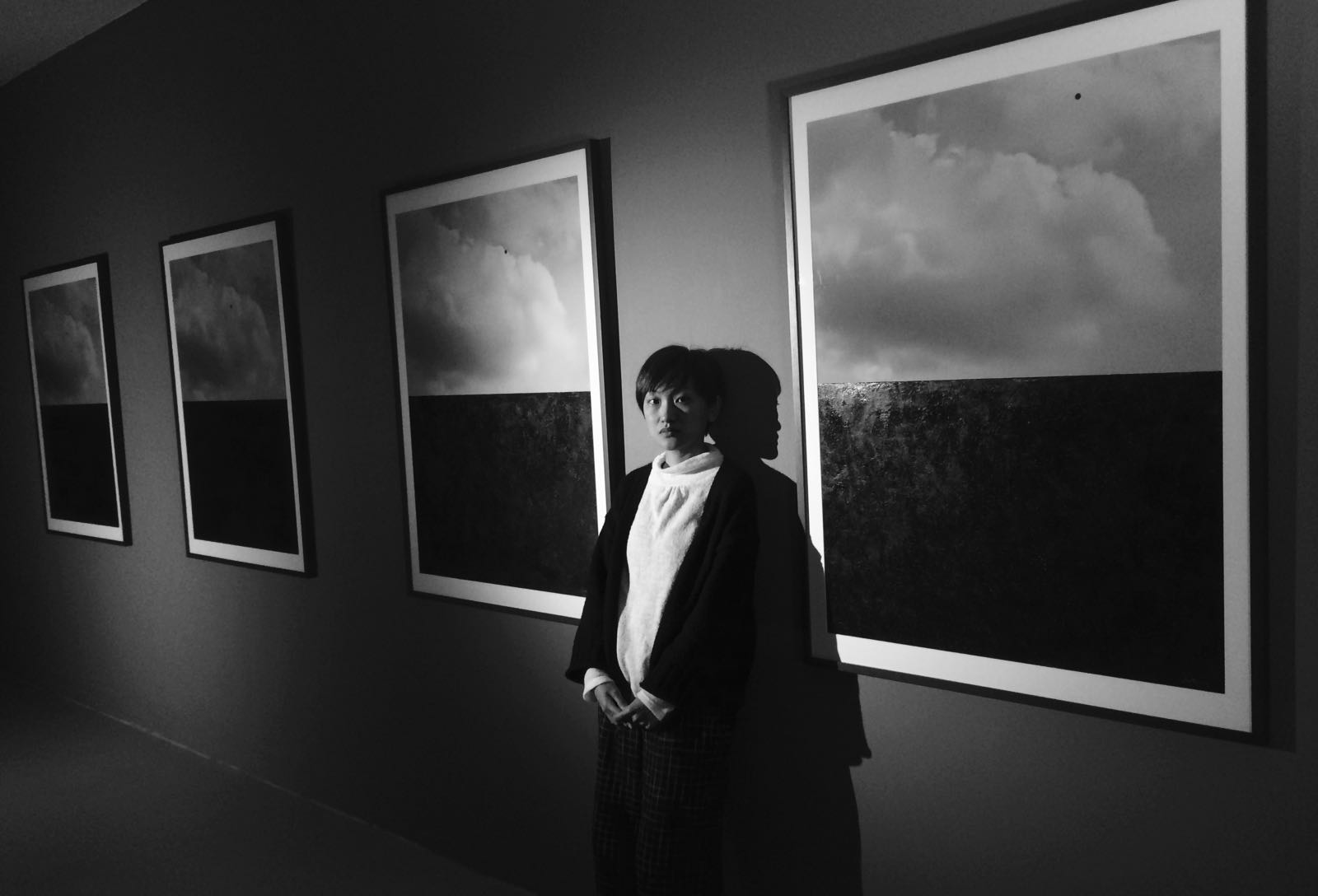
- Born: 1973 (age 52–53); Hong Kong
- Education: University of Leeds, UK; Royal Melbourne Institute of Technology (RMIT) / The Art School, Hong Kong Arts Centre
- Known for: Mixed media
- Awards: Hong Kong Contemporary Art Award; 2012 Young Artists Award
- Website: ivyma.net

Ivy Ma
- Traditional Chinese: 馬琼珠
- Simplified Chinese: 马琼珠
Transcriptions
Standard Mandarin
- Hanyu Pinyin: Mǎ Qióngzhū
Yue: Cantonese
- Jyutping: maa5 king4 zyu1

Ivy Ma (Ma King Chu; Chinese: 馬琼珠; born 1973) is a Hong Kong visual artist specializing in mixed media works. Her works were featured in the Hong Kong Art Biennial in 2005 and the Hong Kong Contemporary Art Awards in 2012. She was the winner of the Young Artist Award category of the 2012 Hong Kong Contemporary Art Awards. She was one of the fifteen artists included in the online Artshare exhibition entitled Resistance dedicated to Hong Kong artists, curated by art writer Caroline Ha Thuc. Recipients of the FCO Chevening University of Leeds Scholarship from the Hong Kong Arts Development Council and the Lee Hysan Foundation Fellowship from the Asian Cultural Council, she participated in various artist-in-residence programs and international artist workshops in Bangladesh, Finland, Åland, and the USA from 2005 to 2009. Her works are in the collection of the Hong Kong Heritage Museum and is part of the Hong Kong Legislative Council Complex Art Acquisition Project commissioned by the Hong Kong Legislative Council Commission.

== Early life and education ==
Ivy Ma was born in Hong Kong in 1973. Her academic training was originally in information science. She received a BA in Information Systems from the City University of Hong Kong in 1996. After working as a programmer and software engineer for some years, she began to study painting in 1999 at the Royal Melbourne Institute of Technology (RMIT) / The Art School, Hong Kong Arts Centre in Hong Kong and earned a BFA (Painting) in 2001. She was awarded a scholarship by the Hong Kong Arts Development Council to study for one year at the University of Leeds in the United Kingdom, where she obtained a MA in Feminist Theory and Practice in Visual Art in 2002.

== Career ==
Ma served as the Project Coordinator / Manager of 1a space, Hong Kong from 2003 to 2005. She was the curator of the exhibitions If Hong Kong, A Woman / Traveller and Schema: a Traveller's approach at 1a space and the Artist Commune in Hong Kong in 2005, two exhibitions which are part of the Bilateral Cultural Exchange Project organized by University of Leeds and 1a space, Hong Kong, showcasing artworks by eight female artists from Hong Kong. She curated the exhibition In Details at agnès b.’s LIBRAIRE GALERIE, Hong Kong in 2010, in which she is also one of the participating artist.

She taught at the HKICC Lee Shau Kee School of Creativity in Hong Kong from 2006 to 2007. She was a part-time lecturer at the Hong Kong Art School from 2004 to 2016, and has assumed the position of full-time Lecturer since September 2016. She is course instructor of Associate Degree of Arts in Visual Arts at the Academy of Visual Arts (AVA), Hong Kong Baptist University since 2015.

Her series of works ‘Numbers Standing Still’ (2012) was collected by Hong Kong Museum of Art in 2013. Another series of works, ‘Last Year’ (2015) was collected by San Francisco Museum of Modern Art (SFMOMA) in 2020.

== Selected works and exhibitions ==
=== 2001 to 2003: Transmigration of Materials ===
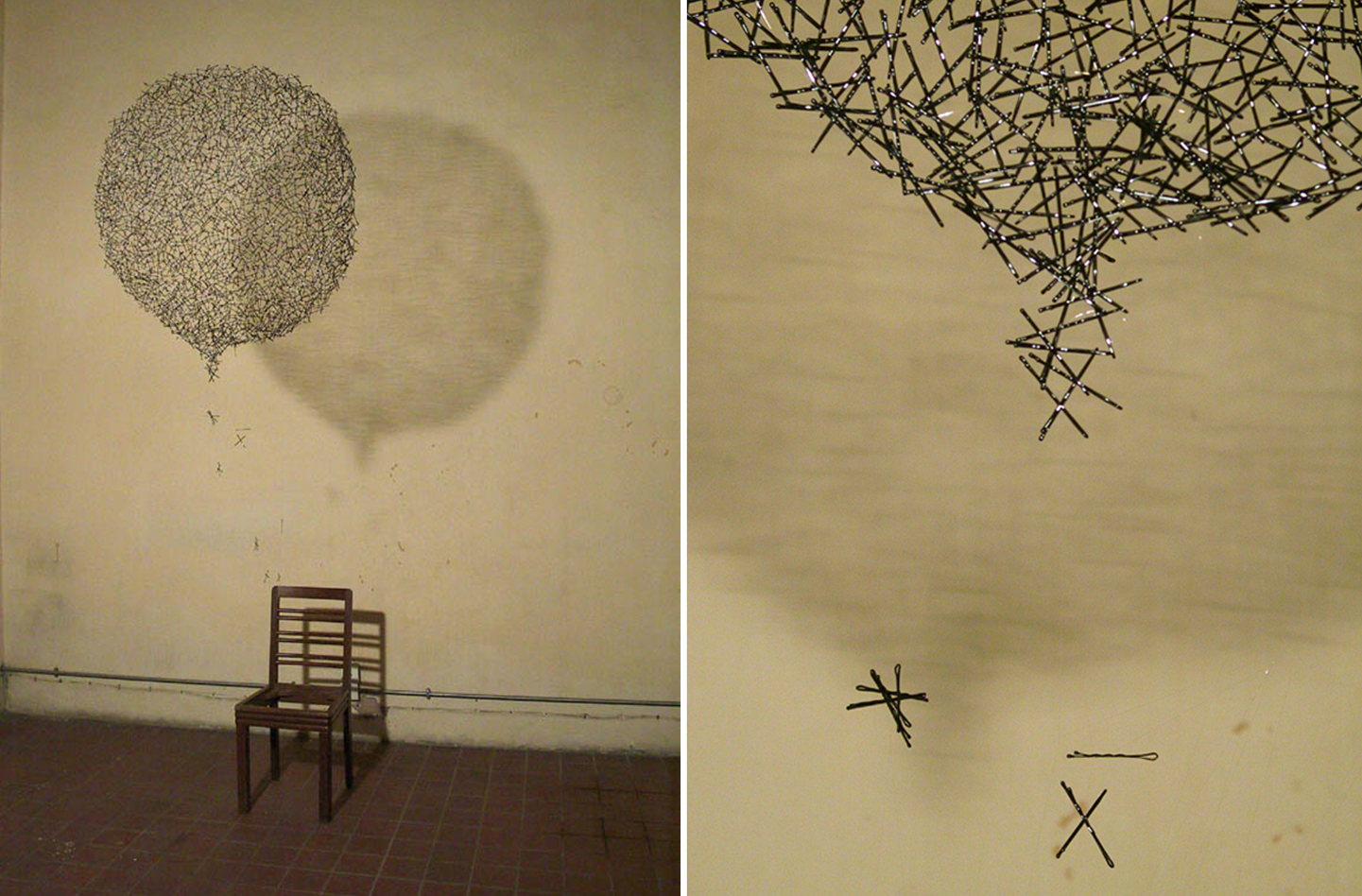
Room of Memories (2001)

Initially working in the media of painting and sculpture during her study at the Royal Melbourne Institute of Technology, Ivy Ma already shown her interest in exploring the marginality of different media and materials in her early works by using everyday materials like hairpins, thread, wood, cotton, dolls, fresh meat, and candies. She called the process "transmigration of materials".

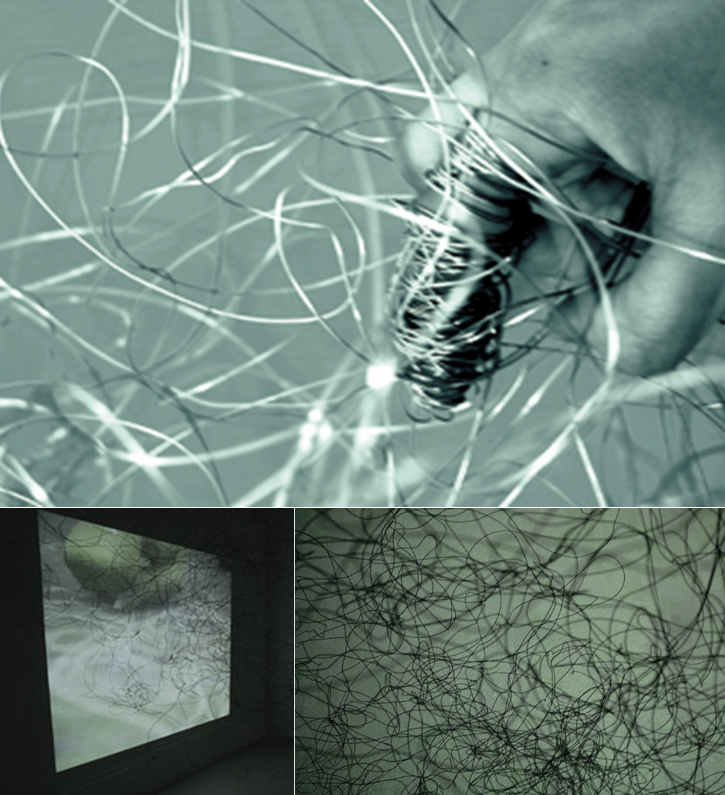
Remember How to Draw (2002)

Shown in the group exhibition entitled Wo-Man at the Old Ladies House in Macau in 2001, Room of Memories (2001) is an installation work consisted of a giant thought bubble composed of hundreds of old-fashioned women's hairpins suspended above a broken chair in a comic-strip narrative.

Remember How to Throb (2002) is an installation consisting of three works presented in the Graduation Exhibition at the University of Leeds where Ma studied with a scholarship by the Hong Kong Arts Development Council. In Remember How to Play (2002), domestic objects such as soft toys, cushions, hair were inserted inside foam and were dotted throughout the exhibition space. Combining video projection and wire, Remember How to Draw (2002) showed the artist’s impulsive reactions to her childhood experience of drawing with fingers.

=== 2003 to 2009: On-site works and overseas residencies ===
While Room of Memories (2001) already touches on memory and history of a site, Far Away, So Close (2003) installed at the Kadoorie Farm Botanic Garden in Hong Kong in the exhibition entitled Dream Garden was one of Ma's earliest site-specific works. She collected trees collapsed during the typhoon. The tree trunks were sawn into columns and mirrors were attached to the cross-section of the trunks. Images of the sky and other trees were reflected at various angles.

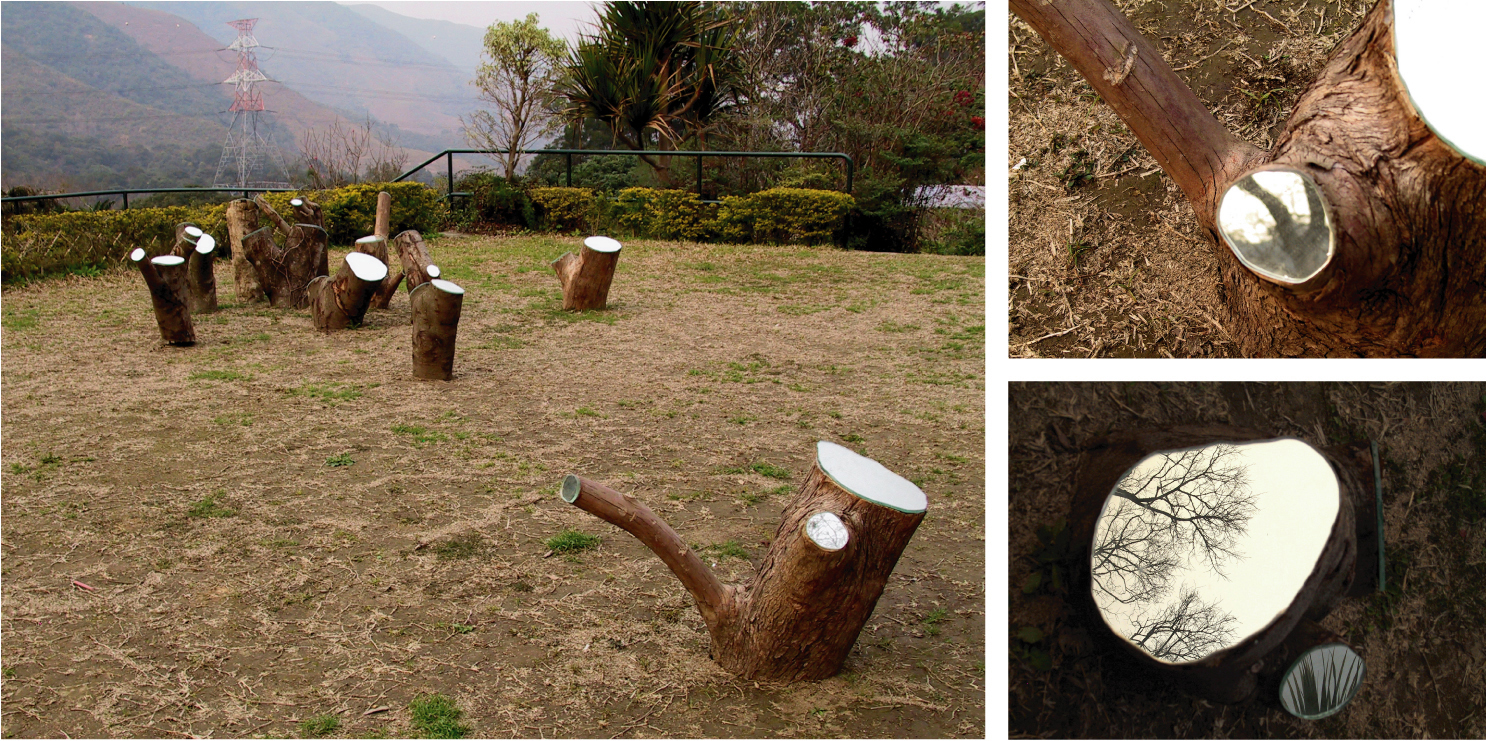
Far Away, So Close (2003), Kadoorie Farm Botanic Garden, Hong Kong

From 2005 to 2009, Ivy Ma participated in a series of artist residencies and workshops in Bangladesh, Europe and the USA. Several on-site works were realized during this period.

As in Remember How to Play and Remember How to Draw (2002), childhood memories plays an important part in A Fairy Tale (2005), a work made during the residency at the Britto International Artists’ Workshop at the Nikera Kori Center in Bangladesh. The work includes a fabricated scaled-down version of a merry-go-round, and candies in silk handkerchief. As mentioned in the artist's notes, "It is about children’s dreams, runs in the air of the playground then settles down in a room…a solitude. It is also about a person watching children play in a playground (as in the lyrics of the Rolling Stones song "As Tears Go By"), from morning to noon...This was indeed a group work and included the owner of the playground…the blacksmith who made the playground ride, his helper and the children I met in the village who gave me inspiration in thinking about the play in one’s childhood." Collaborated with Abdullah Syed (Pakistan), another participant in the workshop, Always land (2005) is an on-site work using net made with plastic thread and falling leaves.

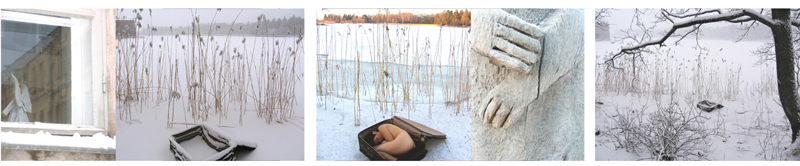
Perception of Phenomenal Soundlessness (2006)

Perception of Phenomenal Soundlessness (2006) is an on-site work produced outdoors during her residency at the Cable Factory in Helsinki, Finland. Performative acts were carried out while Ma wandered in the frosty landscape. She dragged an empty suitcase with broken wheels to the lakeside, filled it with her own curled up, unclothed body and photographed herself; she gathered tree sticks from grave land and rearranged them on the ice; and she stuffed ice into a man-shaped cloth doll and hanged it on a tree. Images and documentation of the work were presented in the exhibition entitled Stained, the eclipsed pattern at Uma-g Gallery, Hong Kong in 2006.

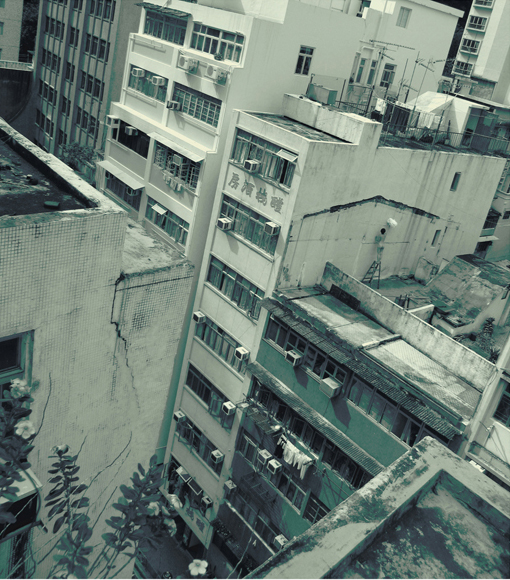
The Wayward Cloud (2006)

The Wayward Cloud (2006) follows a similar methodology. Originally an on-site work created when Ma lived in Wan Chai on the Hong Kong Island, It is about the view seen looks back at the seer, an idea already explored in Far Away, So Close (2003). In the artist's word, "I loved to look from my window and see many old buildings. Then I wanted to search for the view that looked back at my home, so I went to the opposite building, and asked the owner if I could pay her a little bit for permission to go to the top and see back to my home." A photograph depicting a naked figure holding a cotton wool cloud on a rooftop and another photograph of the rooftop without the figure taken at the scene were included in the exhibition Perhaps, Solitude at the studio of the late Jerry Kwan, teacher of Ivy Ma in Fotan in 2007.

In Another Land (2008) is an installation piece created during her residency at the Headlands Center for the Arts in San Francisco, using pebbles collected from Rodeo Beach nearby and cotton thread from a closed-down factory in Oakland.

=== 2010 to 2015: Found images and drawing-interventions ===
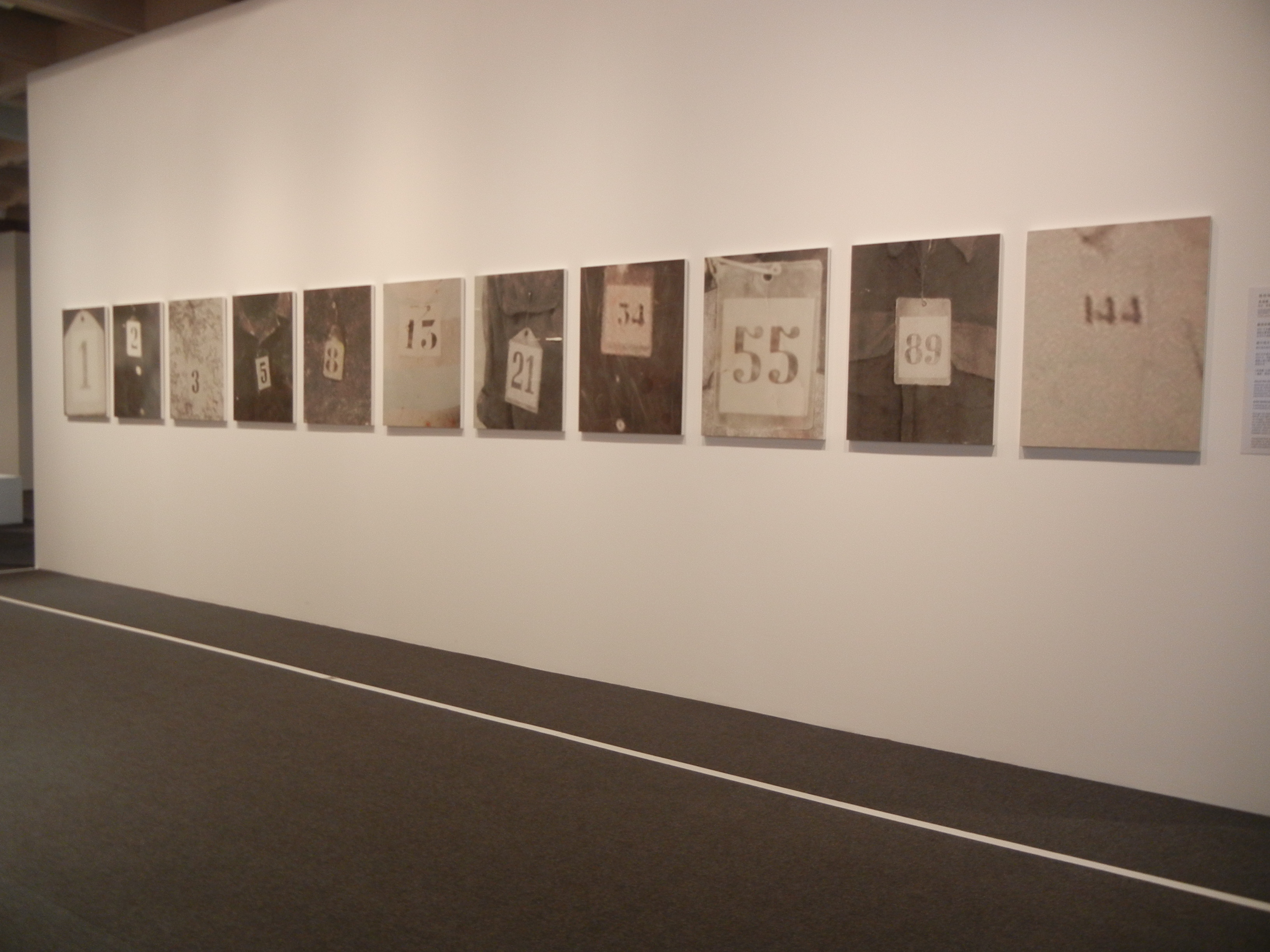
Numbers Standing Still (2012), Installation view at the Hong Kong Museum of Art

Starting in 2010 Ivy Ma began focusing on found images, both stills taken from specific films and photographs found in history museums, for an ongoing series of what she calls "drawing-interventions" where she actively erases and draws into and over the existing image. In the exhibitions In Details (2010) at agnès b.’s LIBRAIRE GALERIE, Hong Kong, Gazes (2011) at Gallery EXIT, Hong Kong, and Still Lifes and Waves (2011) at the Hong Kong Film Archive, Ma presented cinematic drawings created by magnifying and printing out film stills of objects, plants and fragments of the mise-en-scène in classic films such as Yasujiro Ozu's Tokyo Story and A Story of Floating Weeds, Yoshimitsu Morita's And Then, Fei Mu's Spring in a small town. Then she draws directly on the prints in various subtle ways.

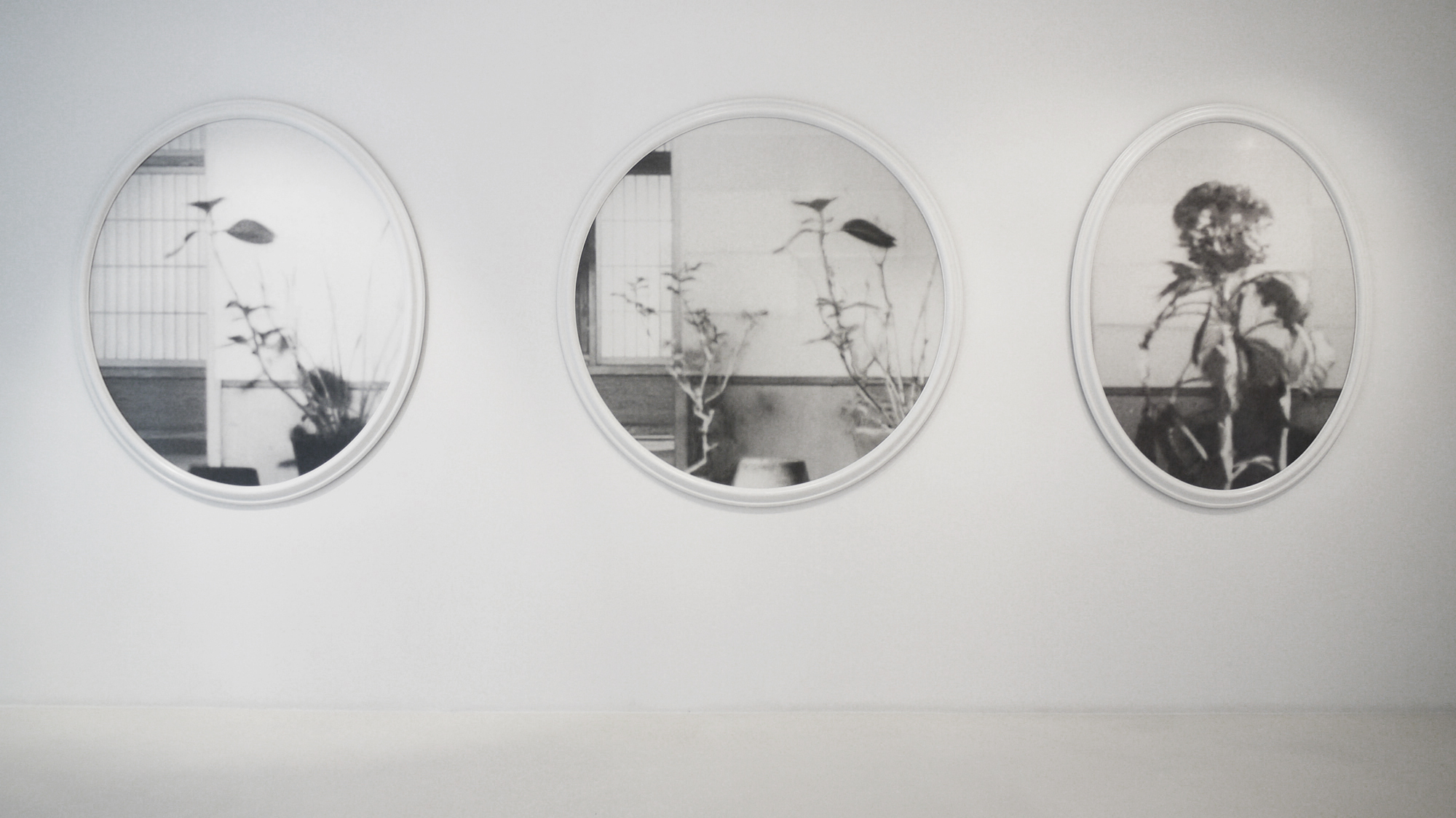
Yasujiro Ozu, Tokyo Story, Flower and Plant (2011)

In the exhibition Numbers Standing Still (2012) at Gallery EXIT, Hong Kong, the source materials are historical images instead of film stills. Re-photographing images of tragedies such as the aftermath of the Hiroshima bombing in Walking Towards (2012), the occupation of Nanjing by Japanese soldiers in Hand 001 / 002 / 003 (2012), and the mass killing by the Khmer Rouge in Cambodia in Cambodia/Tuol sleng Genocide Museum/Numbers Standing Still (2012), she erased large portion of the images and then overlapped them with pigments.

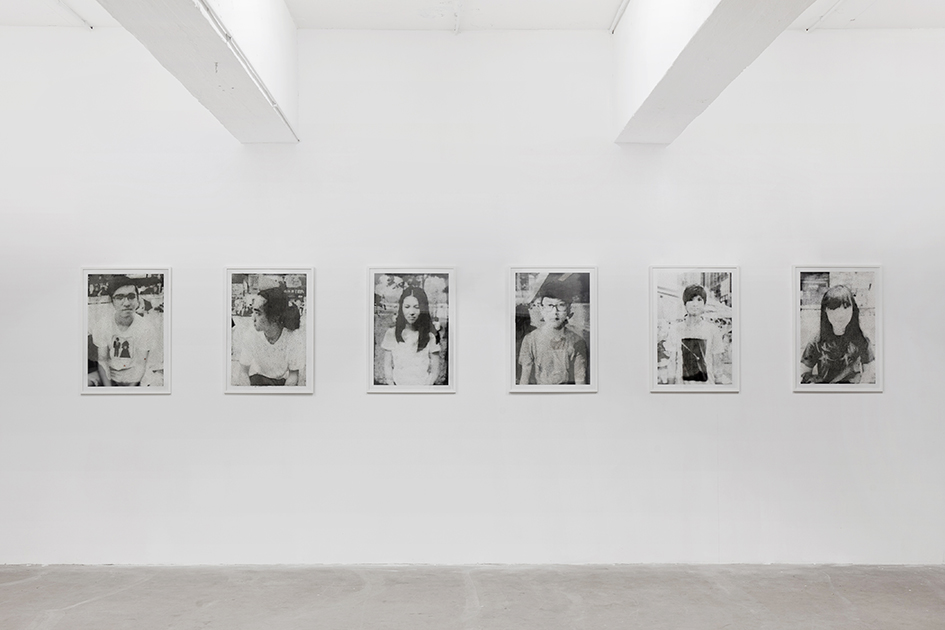
Last Year (2015)

Ma shifted her focus to people in the exhibition Someone (2014) at the Goethe-Gallery and Black Box Studio, Hong Kong. Source materials range from people in the artist's family photographs, to strangers in found photographs and antique photographs, to faces and bodies of people in historical images of war and disaster.

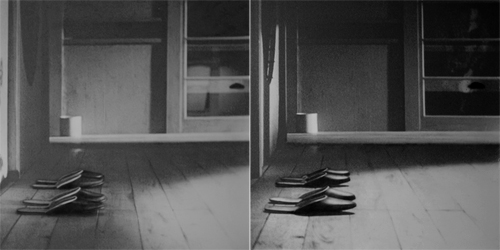
Yasujiro Ozu, Tokyo Story, Slippers (2011)

Works presented in the exhibition Last Year (2015) at Gallery EXIT, Hong Kong represents an important development in Ma's drawing-interventions which she has been developed for the past 5 years. It is the first time Ma has taken current events as the subject. "I am trying to see how a present moment will very soon be a past moment and understand what this means...I'm always fascinated by the distance between the present and the past, as well as how history is archived and presented to us in the now," Ma talked about the works in an interview with the South China Morning Post. As the title suggests, the series includes 40 black and white mixed-media portraits based on images of protesters Ma taken with a smartphone during the Occupy protest in Hong Kong in 2014.

== Full list of exhibitions ==
=== Solo exhibitions ===
2024

- Ascending and Descending, Galerie J/, Paris

2021

- Think of Wind, Touch Gallery, Hong Kong

2020

- Poems, days, death, Lumenvisum, Hong Kong

2018

- As Time Folds, Art and Culture Outreach, Hong Kong

2015

- Last Year, Gallery EXIT, Hong Kong

2014

- Someone, Goethe-Gallery and Black Box Studio, Hong Kong

2012

- Numbers Standing Still, Gallery Exit, Hong Kong

2011

- Still Lifes and Waves, Artists in the Neighbourhood Scheme V, Hong Kong Film Archive and Commercial Press Book Shop, Hong Kong
- Gazes, Gallery Exit, Hong Kong

2010

- Hardly Entered, Already Gone, YY9 Gallery, Hong Kong

2009

- Deer Running, Gifu Municipal Culture Center, Gifu, Japan
- Domestic Nature, Brandt Gallery, Cleveland, USA

2007

- Perhaps, Solitude, Loft 21, Fotanian Studio Open 2007, Hong Kong

2001

- Nothing At All, The Art School Learning Centre Gallery, Hong Kong

=== Group exhibitions ===
2025

- Chow Chun Fai, Ivy Ma King Chu: The Fifth Season, Gallery EXIT, Hong Kong
- Crossing, gdm, Hong Kong

2024

- Bird of Shape, Jimei × Arles Discovery Award, Jimei × Arles International Photo Festival, Xiamen, China
- Alternative Time: Traversing through Mobility, Mooroom, Hong Kong
- Closer Together, Pao Galleries, Hong Kong Arts Centre, Hong Kong
- Bird of Shape - A Non-Solo of Ivy Ma, in association with Carol Chow, Man Mei To and June Wong, Tangent Projects, Barcelona, Spain

2023

- Closer Together, RMIT Gallery, Melbourne, Australia
- Flower・Mother – A Conversation Exhibition between Ivy Ma and Stephen Lam, Lumenvisum, Hong Kong

2022

- The Cave of the Demons, Lateral ArtSpace, Cluj-Napoca, Romania
- When will I see you again, SC Gallery, Hong Kong
- 31 Women Artists Hong Kong, 10 Chancery Lane Gallery, Hong Kong

2021

- Residual Heat, Axel Vervoordt Gallery, Hong Kong

2020

- Now Showing, Karin Weber Gallery, Hong Kong
- XX: An Exhibition Celebrating the 20th Anniversary of Hong Kong Art School, Pao Galleries, Hong Kong Arts Centre, Hong Kong
- Drawing as the Core, Koo Ming Kown Exhibition Gallery, Lee Shau Kee Communication & Visual Arts Building, Hong Kong Baptist University, Hong Kong
- The spaces Between the Words Are Almost Infinite, Gallery EXIT, Hong Kong

2018

- Social Transformation, Pao Galleries, Hong Kong Arts Centre, Hong Kong
- Collections of Tom, Debbie and Harry, JC Contemporary, Tai Kwun, Hong Kong
- The Crossing, Gallery EXIT, Hong Kong
- What Has Been, Will Be Lost Until We Find It, Karin Weber Gallery, Hong Kong

2017

- Ink Asia Art Fair 2017, The Hong Kong Convention and Exhibition Centre, Hong Kong
- Deep Silence – Hong Kong Art School Alumni Network Exhibition 2017, Pao Galleries, Hong Kong Arts Centre, Hong Kong
- (An)other-Half: Being a Wife/Mother and the Practices of the Self, Osage Gallery, Hong Kong
- ArtTravellers Exhibition Series I: Decoding Exotic Lands, Art Promotion Office, Hong Kong

2016

- Islands’ Narrative: Literature X Visual Art, 1a space, Hong Kong
- as the leaves fall, Grey and Green Ping Pong Collaboration Art Project, 1a space, Hong Kong
- Art Basel HK 2016, The Hong Kong Convention and Exhibition Centre, Hong Kong

2015

- Recollections, Mur Nomade, Hong Kong
- Ceramic Show by Non-ceramic Artists, 1a space, Cattle Depot Artist Village, Hong Kong
- Painting On and On 6: Gaze of Sins, Koo Ming Kown Gallery, Hong Kong Baptist University, Hong Kong

2014

- Resistance, Online Exhibition on Artshare

2013

- Art Basel HK 2013, The Hong Kong Convention and Exhibition Centre, Hong Kong
- Hong Kong Contemporary Art Awards 2012, Hong Kong Museum of Art, Hong Kong
- Painting On and On 4: Intertextuality, Lingnan University, Hong Kong
- Transformation & 8th Anniversary Show, YY9 Gallery, Hong Kong

2012

- Running on the Sidelines – Hong Kong New Media Art Exhibition, Soka Art Center, Taipei, Taiwan
- The Chronicle of Disappearance, Gallery EXIT, Hong Kong
- 樓住生活, Blue House, Wan Chai, Hong Kong
- Post-Straight: Contemporary Hong Kong Photography, Hong Kong Heritage Museum, Hong Kong
- Why Do Trees Grow Till the End?, Gallery EXIT - SOUTHSITE, Hong Kong

2011

- Rediscover Photography, China Pingyao International Photography Festival 2011, Pingyao, China

2010

- Exhibiting Experiments. Experimenting Exhibitions, Wrong Place, JCCAC, Hong Kong
- City Flâneur: Social Documentary Photography, Hong Kong Heritage Museum, Hong Kong
- In Details, agnès b.’s LIBRAIRE GALERIE, Hong Kong
- Memory Clothed Here – A Performance, Woofer Ten, Shanghai Street Art Space, Hong Kong

2009

- Intersection, Pao Gallery, Hong Kong Arts Centre, Hong Kong
- Imaging Hong Kong, Hong Kong Central Library / Edge Gallery, Hong Kong

2008

- Women’s Work, Osage Gallery, Hong Kong
- Art Container Project, West Kowloon Cultural District, Hong Kong

2007

- The Preview of New West Kowloon Exhibition Venue, C&G Artpartment, Hong Kong
- October Contemporary 2007, 1a space, Cattle Depot Artist Village, Hong Kong
- A Separate Domain, Hui Gallery, The Chinese University of Hong Kong, Hong Kong
- STABLE- the balance of power, Para/Site (part of Fotanian 2007 Open studios), Hong Kong

2006

- Between the Observer and the Observed, Lianzhou International Photo Festival, Lianzhou, China
- Second Skin, 3 Boxes, Hong Kong
- Media Art Show, Vasl International Artists’ Collective, Pakistan
- 2005 Hong Kong Art Biennial Exhibition, Hong Kong Museum of Art, Hong Kong
- Stained, the eclipsed pattern, Uma-g Gallery, Hong Kong

2005

- Pre-Work, Hong Kong Arts Center, Hong Kong
- Curiosities, Para/Site, Hong Kong
- Re:wanchi, HKAIR International Artists’ Workshop, Hong Kong
- Britto International Artists’ Workshop, NikeraKori Center, Nungola, Bora, Bangladesh
- Cattle - Can All the Tenants Laugh Efficiently, Artist Commune, Hong Kong

2004

- Dream Garden, Kadoorie Farm and Botanic Garden, Hong Kong

2003

- Meat, 1a space, Cattle Depot Artists Village, Hong Kong
- Linkage, Calypso, Hong Kong

2002

- Articulation, University of Leeds, United Kingdom

2001

- Wo-Man, Female Artists Installation, Old Ladies House, Macau
- Girls’ Thing, Fringe Club, Hong Kong

2000

- BAFA 2000 Exhibition, Faculty Gallery, RMIT, Melbourne, Australia

== International Artist Workshops / Artist-in-Residence ==
2008–2009

- Location One, New York City, USA

2008

- The Headlands Center for the Arts, San Francisco, USA

2007

- The Åland Archipelago Guest Artist Residence, Kökar, Åland

2006

- HIAP (Helsinki International Artist Program), Cable Factory, Helsinki, Finland

2005

- HKAIR (International Artists’ Workshop), Hong Kong
- Britto International Artists’ Workshop, Nikera Kori Center, Nungola, Bora, Bangladesh

== Awards ==
2012

- Hong Kong Contemporary Art Award, Young Artists Award, Hong Kong Museum of Art

2007

- Lee Hysan Foundation Fellowship, Asian Cultural Council

2001–2002

- Hong Kong Arts Development Council – FCO Chevening University of Leeds Scholarship

== Publications ==
Ivy Ma: This Room Is Not Still | Selected Works, 2000-2012
