= Epoxy Art Group =

Art collective in New York City

Epoxy Art Group (active from 1982 to 1992) was a group of six Hong Kong native artists who were based in New York City. This group consisted of the artists Ming Fay, Jerry Kwan, Kwok Mang Ho, Bing Lee, Kang Lok Chung, and Eric Chan. Exalting the values of collaboration, they chose to use the name “Epoxy”, which derives from epoxy resin, a binding agent, to symbolize an innate bond they felt through their similar backgrounds and the idea that they could create better art together than by themselves, thus subverting notions of individualistic studio practices. They were able to establish opportunities together that they would not have own their own as it was a disadvantage to be an Asian-American artist. Their art focused on concepts of social and political commentary and they used a variety of medium including mixed-media, photocopied images, sound installation and projection in order to convey these themes. Typically, they would meet at Kwok Gallery, which served as their base.

== Exhibitions ==
The works by Epoxy Art Group has shown in a variety of venues. One of their first shows entitled, Works on Wall, was shown at Kwok Gallery in 1983; this installation included a guest artist, Andrew Culver, who performed live music at the show's opening.

Their installation, Myths, was displayed at the Catherine Gallery, Basement Workshop, Inc in 1985 and featured sculptures as well as a floor to ceiling mural. The show referenced the cultural myth that Asian-Americans are well assimilated into American culture, yet they are frequently viewed as outsiders

In 1987, at a show called Out of Context in Hong Kong, the Epoxy Group emphasized the cross cultural confusion between Eastern and Western societies by displaying a wall covered in photocopies of people while projecting the names of missiles in Chinese and English onto a backdrop.

Another show in 1987 called, 36 Tactics, composed of a series of 36 xeroxed collages, used images appropriated and reworked from notable photographs from the media, such as pictures of former President Reagan and chairman Mao Zedong. The images were layered with text deriving from Sun Tzu's The Art of War written in both English and Chinese, which evoked issues related to political deception and military applications. The exhibition was shown at various locations including Sabrina Fung Gallery (1987), the Alternative Museum (1987) and the New Museum (1990) in a group exhibition, called The Decade Show: Frameworks of Identity in the 1980s.

Epoxy's last group show entitled, 18 Levels of Hell, was displayed at the Asian American Arts Centre in 1988. The central idea was based from the Chinese myth called Di Yu, which describes the traditional Chinese conception of purgatory. The exhibition included a variety of elements such as sculpture, writing, music, and a mural that covered the gallery space from floor to ceiling.
