= Laura Ziegler =

American sculptor 1927-2017

- Born: 1927
- Died: 2017 (aged 89–90)
- Website: lauraziegler.com

Laura Ziegler (1927–2017) was an American artist. She is known for her sculpture. Born in Columbus, Ohio, Ziegler studied at the Columbus Art School, Ohio State University, and the Cranbrook Academy of Art. She died on May 4, 2017, in Lucca, Italy.

Her work is in the Brooklyn Museum, the Columbus Museum of Art, the Hirshhorn Museum and Sculpture Garden, and the Museum of Modern Art.

The National Sculpture Society has a scholarship for emerging sculptors in her name.
