= Kwok Mang Ho =

Artist based in Hong Kong

Kwok Mang-ho
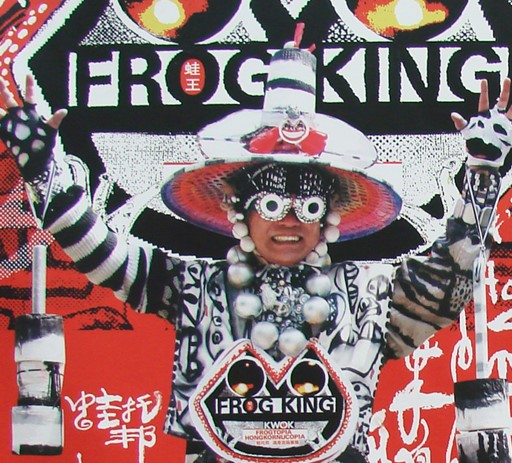
- Hong Kong artist Kwok Mang-ho, aka Frog King
- Born: 1947 (age 78–79); Guangdong, China
- Education: Grantham College of Education Hong Kong(Fine Art), Chinese University and the University of Hong Kong, Extramural Studies Department, Art Students League of New York
- Known for: Performance art, Sculpture, Chinese ink painting, Chinese Calligraphy, Environmental installation, Video Art, Graffiti
- Notable work: Frog King Kwok Museum project (2001-present),9 million works (1999-present), Frog Fun Lum (1998)

Kwok Mang Ho (born 1947), also known as Frog King, is a multi-media, conceptual, visual and performance artist from Hong Kong. According to Oscar Ho, the former exhibition director of Hong Kong Art Centre, he is one of the pioneers of contemporary art in Hong Kong during the early 70s. His artistic uniqueness is best expressed in his creations “Frogtopia”, which takes over the exhibition space with numerous colourful mixed-media installations and graffiti of his signatured frog icon. In addition to his inexhaustible style, Kwok held a solo multimedia art exhibition representing Hong Kong “Frogtopia-Hongkorucopia” (蛙托邦•鴻港浩搞筆鴉) at the 54th Venice Biennale in 2011. He is currently the director of the Frog King Museum at Cattle Depot Artist Village since 2001.

== Early life and education ==
Kwok Mang-Ho (aka Frog King) was born in 1947 in Guangdong, China and grew up in Hong Kong. He began his artistic practice as a traditional ink painter under the guidance of Lui Shou-Kwan, who was known as the “Hong Kong New Ink Painting master” at the time. He was enrolled in the Fine Art programme at the Grantham College of Education in Hong Kong (now renamed the Institute of Education) from 1967 to 1970. Concurrently, during 1968 to 1973, he further studied in extramural courses at the Chinese University of Hong Kong as well as the University of Hong Kong. After his completion of the programmes, Kwok went to the Art Students League of New York for further education(1980-1984). He spent 15 years in New York City experiencing new art scenes, and eventually returned and settled down in Hong Kong in 1995.

== Career ==
Apart from his own creative projects, Kwok also engaged himself in the art scenes as administrator or supervisors both in Hong Kong and New York.

From 1970 to 1975, he took part as the stage designer at the Experimental Cantonese Opera association of Hong Kong; meanwhile from 1971 to 1976, he was one of the principle art teachers at a local secondary school (New Territories Heung Yee Kuk Yuen Long District Secondary School). In the year 1974, Kwok first time made himself a curator at the Conceptual Art Exhibition in Hong Kong. Since 1977 until 1980, he was committed as the lecturer at the School of Design of the Hong Kong Polytechnic University.

While spending his time in New York, Kwok further gained professional experiences for being the curator of the Kwok Gallery Community Art Show & Projects (1982–84), the visual director at Yomoma Art Icl. (1984–91), and the wearable art designer at the Art Accessories(1985–91).

After his return to Hong Kong, in 2000, Kwok continued taking part in the local creative sector. Since then and now-on, he is the advisor for the Art Focus Joint School Art Exhibition, director of the Museum Project at the Cattle Depot Artist Village, director of the Hong Kong Art Institute and art course teacher at the Student Union of Hong Kong Polytechnic University.

== Works ==
Kwok's works enclose a great diversity of media covering calligraphy, sculpture, installation, performance art and photography. Since 1967, he has produced numerous creative projects in over 3,000 art events around the world, including London, New York, Paris, Tokyo, Seoul, Toronto, Hong Kong and Singapore. Some of his most famous works are 9 Million Works(1999), Frog Fun Lum(2007) and Plastic Bags Project(1978). Apart from the above, he also starting numbers of interactive worldwide projects such as the Body Installation Project(1981–present), Froggy Sunglasses 10 Years Project(1989-present), Nine Million Works Project(1999–present) and Frog King Kwok Museum Project(2001–present).

The above mixed-media installation and exhibitions are considered part of his Nine Million Works Project.

=== Style ===
During the late 60s, Kwok began on experimenting with contemporary art. He worked on ready-made objects, mixed media and collage in repeated manner. “To me, art is life and life is art” he said. The boundary between art and his life is blurry and interdependent. He is considered to be an eccentric artist whose work is intuitive with chaotic expression and experimental spirit. He emphasizes the spontaneous imagination, improvisation, interaction and participation. During the exhibition of 9 Million Works and Frog Fun Lum, he did some improvisation performances entitled “One Second Body Installation” and “One Second Live Art” with the audience. The iconic motifs in his works are the graffiti-style frog's face and a pair of eyes as the symbol of a bridge or boat, which both represents the perpetuity and the cycle of life. “Frogtopia”, refers to the Utopia of his artistic space, which is embodied by the construction of his collage, mixed media art and installation.

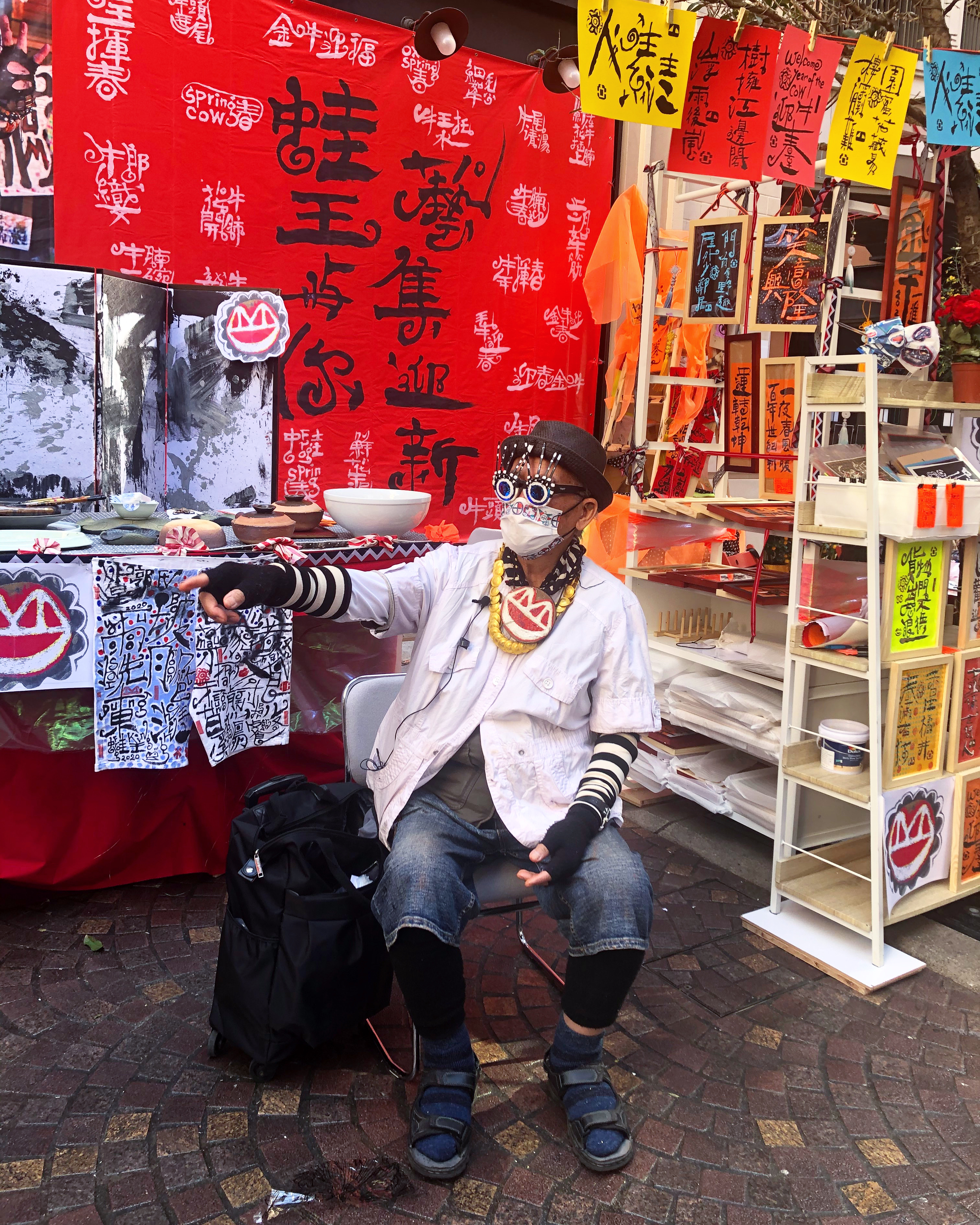
Kwok, Mang-Ho (Frog King) on Lee Tung Avenue in Wan Chai, Hong Kong in 2021

=== Identification with frogs ===
In an interview with a CNN journalist Doug Meigs, Kwok revealed that his attachment toward frogs had taken a significant part during his growing up. For instance, according to the article, when he was about 5 years old, he usually climbed up a huge rock called "Big Froggy Rock" in Happy Valley so as to watch the horse races; later in his teenage years, he refereed himself as the "Frog Prince" when approaching girls.

After staying abroad for more than a decade, Kwok absorbed notably western cultures and mindsets. Thus so, he developed a more mature and in-depth perception toward frogs. With the multi-cultural background he has, he relates himself to frogs which are amphibians that could live vividly either in water or on land and explore freely the two different worlds.

=== Artistic experiment with the Plastic Bags Project ===
In the late 1970s, Kwok started using plastic bags as the major medium in his creative projects. The Plastic Bags Project, was first introduced in 1978, which he attached plastic bags in circles to create a 3-dimensional installation in a public space in Toronto. The concept behind was to sculpt air and plastic bags was for him the perfect malleable container. This specific choice of this uncommon elemental material led him the pioneer in Hong Kong art scene.

Through this piece of work, Kwok expects to put people's garbage, problems, anxiety and those are not to be seen inside the bags. He aimed to turn the use of plastic bags of creating 'air sculpture' into a meaningful act, rather than only as an contention against the unconscious action of concealment; he wanted to it to be a new form of art.

After the success, Kwok intrepid art performances of tying plastic bags in Tiananmen Square and Great Wall shocked the conventional contemporaries. This Great Wall plastic bag action, named the Plastic Bag Happenings in China(1979), which is also referred as the Plastic Bag Installation Along The Great Wall, was part of the “Kwok in Beijing” project created during his visit to Beijing in April, 1979. It was his earliest performance art, and was simultaneously the earliest documented performance art in China in the late 70s. He continued to work on the Big Plastic Bag Action collaborating with students from Tsuen Wan Hoi Pa Street Government Primary School.

=== Public collection ===
- 1967 One Man Show, Grantham College of Education, Hong Kong
- 1970 “Blue Turtle” One Man Show, Environmental Sculpture, St.John Ambulance Assn, H.K.
- 1978 ‘Park Environmental Sculpture’ Harbour Front Gallery, Toronto, Canada (plastic bag)
- 1979 Modern Art in Hong Kong Frog King Live Art Project
- 1979 Live Performance & Installation
- 1979 Great Wall, Beijing (plastic bag)
- 1979 Summer Palace, Beijing (plastic bag)
- 1982-84 Kwok Gallery, New York
- 1982 NYC SoHo Street Installation
- 1983 Frog King Live Art New York
- 1984 Frog Concept
- 1986 ‘Gods Party’ Installation, Everson Museum of Art, Syracuse, USA
- 1992 'The Art Mall: A Social Space,' New Museum, New York.
- 1995 ‘Traveling Frog Installation’, Central St. Martins, London, UK
- 1995 East Village Nyc
- 1997 ‘Reunion & Vision’ Hong KOng Museum of Art, Hong Kong
- 1997 ‘Frog Column’ Fung Ping Shan Museum HK 1997
- 2001 Frog King's Colour Calligraphy
- 2002 Busan Biennale Live Performance, Seoul
- 2003 Transbourder Language, Beijing 798 Art Zone
- 2008 Artist-In-Residence Program ‘Tomi-Saruku’ Riverpal Gokasegawa, Miyazzaki, Japan
- 2011 “Frogtopia-Hongkorucopia”, Hong Kong Representative, 54th Venice Biennale
- 2014 “Frogtopia-Hongkorucopia”, 10 Chancery Lane Gallery Hong Kong
- 2018 Booth at Art Basel Hong Kong

=== Site specific sculpture ===
- 1971 The seven Columns
- 1971-78 Light sculptures, columns sculpture
- 1976 ‘Perpetuity’ Metal Steel Sculpture/Fire Relief Wood, plastic pipes
- 1976 Bamboo, basket sculptures City Hall
- 1976-77 ASSEMBLAGE Basket, bamboo, charcoal, light sculpture

=== Fire sculpture ===
- 1977 Kwok at Hong Kong Art Center VAS Annual Show
- 1977 Hong Kong Polytechnic Experimental Calligraphy Big Action ‘The Art of Water’

=== Painting ===
- 1989 ‘Frog’, Mixed Media on paper
- 1997 Acrylic on canvas
- 2010 ‘Frog Garden’
- 2010 ‘Frogscape’

== Achievement ==
He has won several awards, including Hong Kong Arts Development Council Emeritus Fellowship in 1998.

- 1975 Fine Art Award for Sculpture, Contemporary Hong Kong Art, HK Museum of Art, HK
- 1978 ‘The 10th International Sculpture Conference’, Hong Kong Representative, Toronto, Canada
- 1982 Painting Award, The Brooklyn Arts and Cultural Association, New York, USA
- 1983 Founder & Member of Epoxy Art Group, NYC, USA
- 1987 Yomoma Arts Group Award, The Best Community Arts Service, NEA, NYC
- 1994 Talented Artist Certificate, Art Commission of the City of New York, NYC, USA
- 1998 Emeritus Fellowship, Hong Kong Arts Development Council, HK
- 1998 Fine Art Award for Mixed-media, Contemporary Hong Kong Art, Hong Kong Museum of Art, H.K.
- 2003 Documentaries of Chinese Performance Art Award, Macao Museum of Art, Macao
- 2005 ‘Top 30 Finalists Artist 2005’, The Sovereign Asian Art Prize, Hong Kong
- 2005 ‘Documentaries of Chinese Performance Art’ Award, Macao Museum of Art, Macao
- 2011 “Frogtopia-Hongkorucopia”, Hong Kong Representative, 54th Venice Biennale

== Publications ==
- 1999 Kwok-Art Life for 30 years 1967 - 1997 遊藝三十年
- 2011 Frogtopia-Hongkornucopia
