= Kutchins =

Kutchins is a surname. Notable people with the surname include:

- Ben Kutchins, American cinematographer
- Laurie Kutchins, American poet

== See also ==
- Hutchins (surname)
