= Ming Fay =

Chinese-born American sculptor (1943–2025)

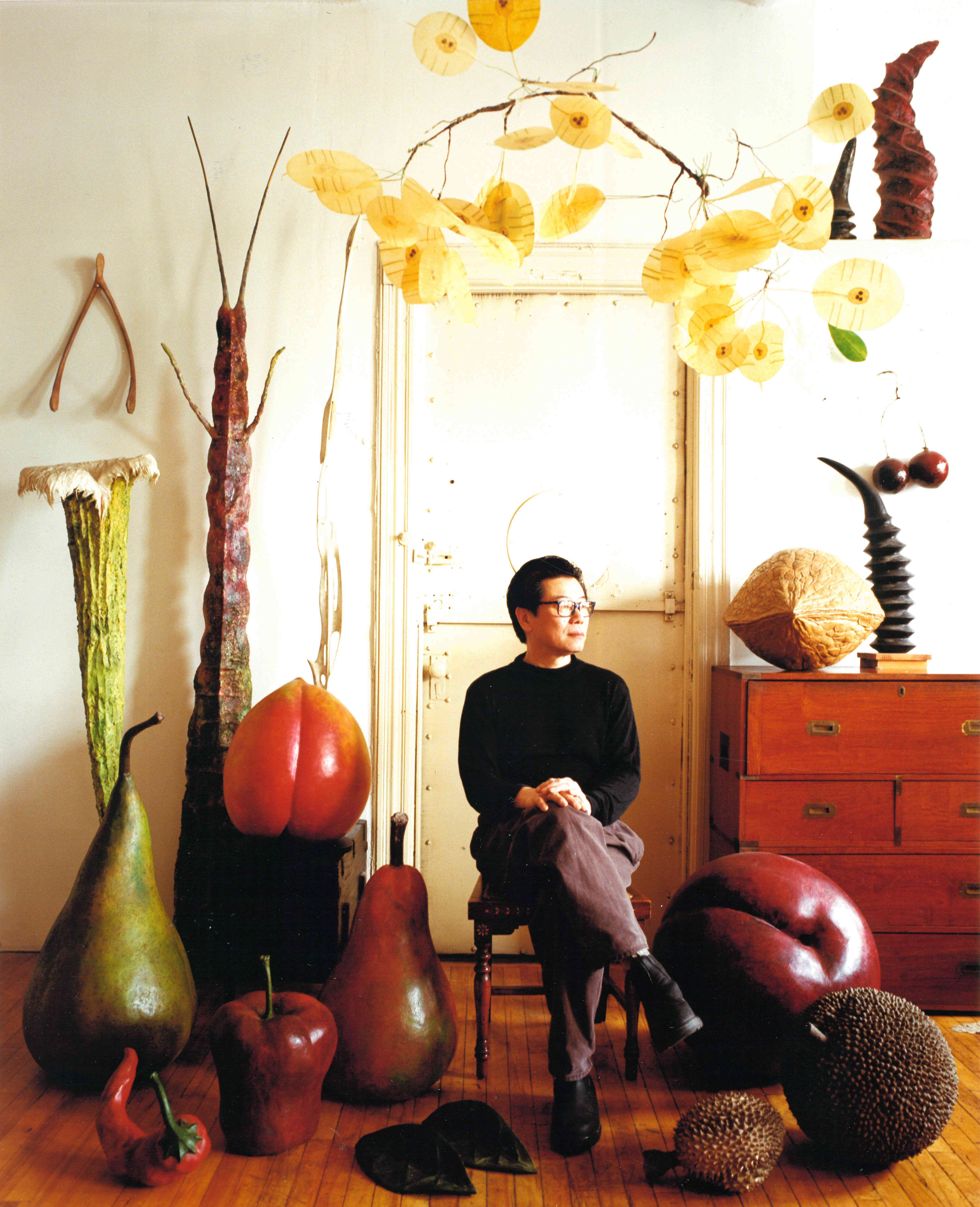
Ming Fay Ming Fay in his New York City loft in the 1990s.
- 费明杰
- Born: February 2, 1943; Shanghai, China
- Died: February 23, 2025 (aged 82); New York City, U.S.
- Education: Columbus College of Art and Design; Kansas City Art Institute (B.F.A.): University of California, Santa Barbara (M.F.A.)
- Occupations: Professor at William Paterson University; Artist
- Known for: Sculpture, Installation
- Website: mingfay.com

Ming Fay (Chinese: 费明杰; also Fei Mingjie; February 2, 1943 – February 23, 2025) was a Chinese-American sculptor based in New York City. He was best-known for his sculptures, public art and large scale installations. He was a professor of sculpture at Maryland Institute College of Art (MICA) and William Paterson University in Wayne, New Jersey. His work focuses on the concept of the garden as a symbol of utopia and the relationship between man and nature. Working primarily in papier-mâché over a wire armature, Fay drew from his life-long engagement with Chinese and American horticulture and mythologies to create sculptures of large-scale botanical forms and invented imaginary species. Fay was a co-founder of Epoxy Art Group, a New York City-based art collective founded in 1982.

== Background ==
Ming Fay was born in Shanghai on February 2, 1943, and in 1952 moved to Hong Kong, soon after the rise of communism in mainland China. His mother was an artist, and his father worked in the then-burgeoning Hong Kong movie industry as an art director. Both were students of Shanghai-based sculptor Zhang Chongren, who had studied Western sculpture in Europe. Fay's mother taught him papier-mache.

Fay came to the United States in 1961 to study at the Columbus College of Art and Design, later transferring to the Kansas City Institute of Art, where he earned his BFA. He moved to New York City in 1973, finding an apartment in Chinatown. Fay earned a graduate degree in sculpture at the University of California, Santa Barbara in 1970.

In 1981, Fay married Pui Lee Chang in New York. He had one son. Ming Gi Fay died on February 23, 2025, at the age of 82.

== Artistic career ==
In 1982, Fay and five other Chinese American artists founded the art collective Epoxy Art Group, which remained active until 1992. Fay was also a member of Godzilla: Asian American Art Network.

Fay completed numerous public art commissions, including a suspended glass and steel sculpture for a residential lobby in Philadelphia, a large scale tree sculpture in Puerto Rico, sculptural benches for New York City's Staten Island Ferry Whitehall Terminal, and glass mosaic murals for the Delancey Street – Essex Street New York City Subway station.

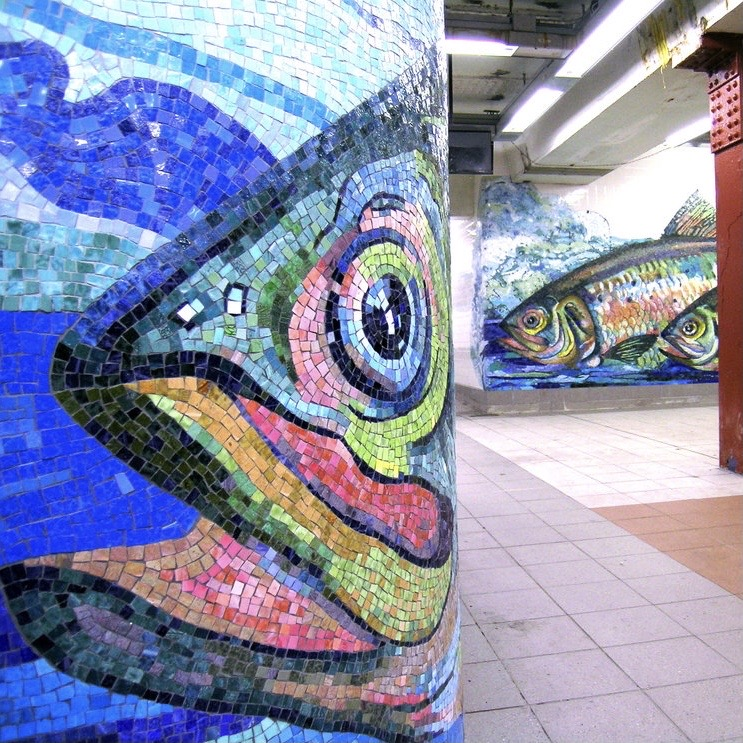
Shad Crossing, 2004. Glass tile mosaic. Delancey Street subway station. Commissioned by the NYC MTA. Photograph by Marissa Alper

Fay received the 2007 NYFA fellowship in Sculpture.

Fay taught sculpture at the Pratt Institute (1978-1980) and at William Paterson University (1983-2016). From 2000 to 2014, he was an Artist-in-Residence at the Rinehart School of Sculpture, Master of Fine Arts Program, at the Maryland Institute College of Art (MICA). He retired from instructing in 2016.

=== Mediums ===
Fay's early sculptural works used metal in abstract geometric forms. While living in New York City, Fay's style began to shift into mixed media sculptures, often depicting giant fruits and plants. Among the materials Fay used were "epoxy, paint, paper pulp, gauze, glass, polystyrene foam, [and] rice paper". He drew inspiration from the city's many fruit markets. Fay also referenced the Chinese folk deitities Sanxing in his works.

=== Exhibitions ===
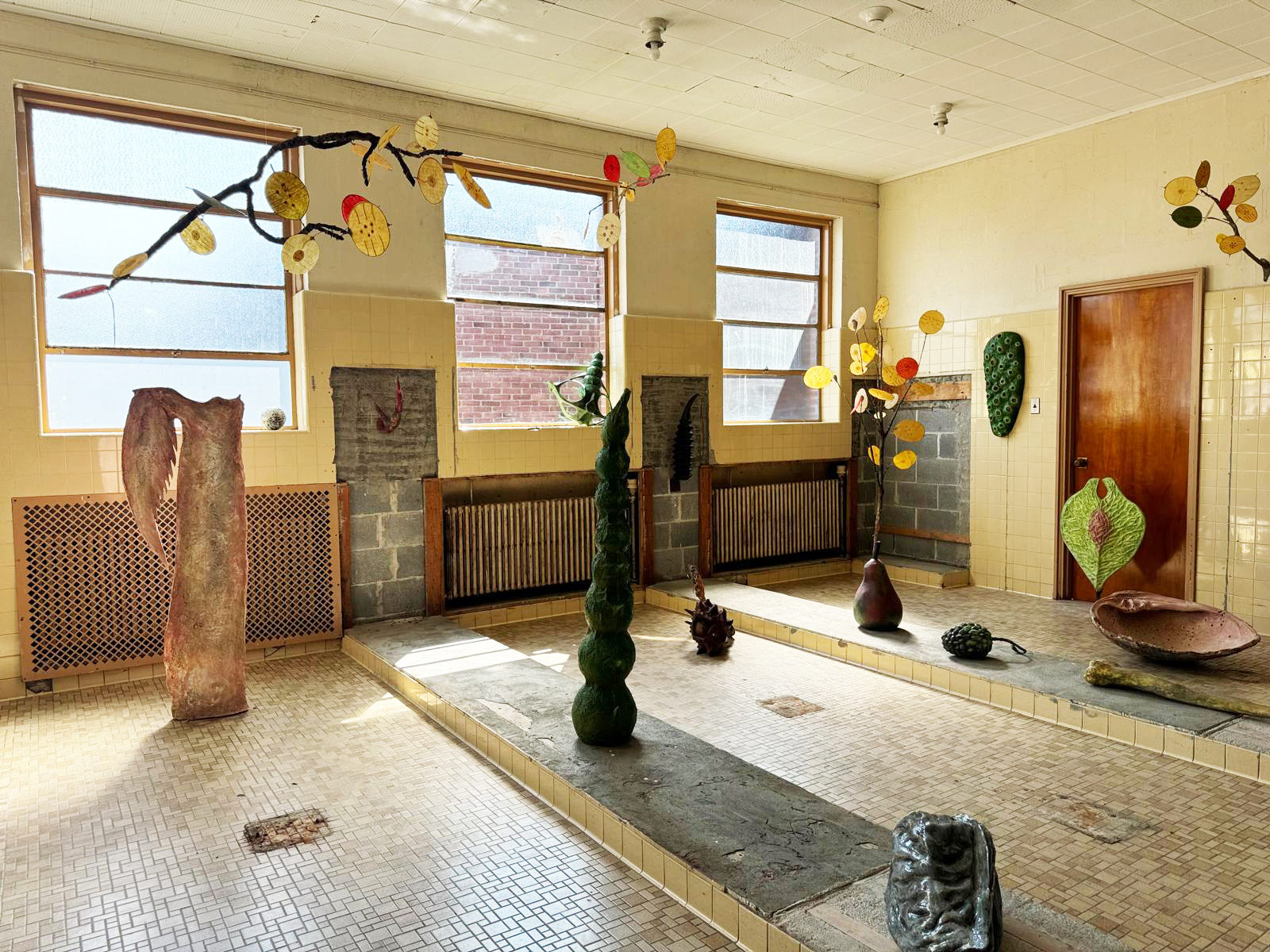
Various sculptures by Ming Fay on view at The Campus, an upstate former school-turned collaborative space

Fay exhibited and is exhibiting internationally in numerous solo exhibitions. His exhibitions have taken place at the Whitney Museum of American Art at Phillip Morris (New York, NY), the National Academy Museum (New York, NY), Museum of Contemporary Art in Shanghai, Łódź Biennale at The International Artists' Museum (Łódź, Poland), Butters Gallery (Portland, Oregon), Ramapo Gallery (Ramapo, New Jersey), and the Hong Kong Museum of Art.

- Ming Fay at The Campus, The Campus, New York (2025)
- midnite porridge, kurimanzutto, New York (2025)
- Ming Fay: Botanical Curiosities, Alisan Fine Arts, New York (2025)
- Metamorphosis: Chinese Imagination and Transformation, China Institute Gallery, New York (2025)
- Ming Fay: Edge of the Garden, Isabella Stewart Gardner Museum, Boston (2025)
- Where We Meet: Imagining Gardens and Futures, Pao Arts Center, Boston (2025)
- New Land Plaza: You Can't Beat a New York Original, Storefront for Art and Architecture, New York (2023)
- Journey into Nature, Alisan Fine Arts Gallery, Hong Kong (2022)
- Sapar Contemporary, New York City (2019)
- Grounds for Sculpture, New Jersey (2012)
- Every Exit Is an Entrance: 30 Years of Exit Art, Exit Art, New York (2012)
- Butters Gallery, Portland, Oregon (2011)
- The Hybrid State, Exit Art, New York (2000)
- The Garden of Sculptural Delights, Exit Art, New York (1994)
- The End, Exit Art, New York (1992)
- Nature Reborn: From Archaeology to Science Fiction, 1979-1990, Terry Adkins Ledis Flam Gallery, New York City (1991)

=== Public art commissions ===
- 2009 Chicago Public Art Program, O'Hare International Airport Terminal 2, Chicago
- 2005 Whitehall Crossing, Staten Island Ferry Whitehall Terminal, Cultural Affairs Department, New York
- 2004 Goldilocks, Tivoli Building, Redevelopment Authority, Philadelphia
- 2004 Pillar Arc, Federal Courthouse, General Services Administration, Seattle
- 2004 Delancey Orchard and Shad Crossing, Delancey Street/Essex Street station, Metropolitan Transit Authority, New York
- 2003 Arbol Magico, Lluberas Park, Department of Transportation and Public Works, Yauco, Puerto Rico
- 2002 Ginkoberry Gwa, Oregon Convention Center, Portland
- 1999 Lippmann Arcade Project, NYC Economic Development Corporation, Queens
- 1998 Staten Island Ferry Terminal Project, Cultural Affairs Department, New York
- 1997 Public Art Fund Project, Phipps Housing, The Bronx, New York
- 1995 Spiral Ears, Philadelphia Criminal Justice Center, Philadelphia
- 1990 Leaf Gate, Keys Flight, Seed of Elm, The Spirit of the Elm, Elm in Bloom, Sprouting Buds, P.S. 7, Elmhurst, NYC Department of Cultural Affairs, Queens, NY

=== Collections ===
- Smithsonian American Art Museum, Washington, DC
- Institute of Contemporary Art, Miami (ICA), Miami, FL
- M+ Museum, Hong Kong, CN
- Brooklyn Museum, New York, NY
- China Club, Hong Kong, CN
- Conrad Hilton Hotel, Hong Kong, CN
- New Museum, New York, NY (Epoxy Art Group)
- Hong Kong Museum of Art, Hong Kong, CN
- J.P. Morgan, Hong Kong, CN
- Taipei Fine Art Museum, Taipei, Taiwan
- Columbus College of Art and Design, Columbus, OH
- Columbus Gallery of Fine Art, Columbus, OH
- Daum Museum of Contemporary Art, Sedalia, MO
- Del Mar College, Corpus Christi, TX
- Howard Plaza Hotel, Taipei, Taiwan
- John Michael Kohler Arts Center, Sheboygan, WI
- Mobil Oil Corporation, New York, NY
- Otis Art Institute, Los Angeles, CA
- Prudential Insurance Company, Los Angeles, CA
- R.J. Reynolds Corporation, Salem, NC
- Rhode Island School of Design, Providence, RI
- Ten Main Center, Kansas City, MO
- Sidney Lewis Foundation, Richmond, VA
- Zimmerli Art Museum, Rutgers University, New Brunswick, NJ

== Awards and honors ==
- 2008 Sculpture Award, National Academy of Art, New York, NY
- 2007 Fellowship in Sculpture, New York Foundation for the Arts, New York, NY
- 2004 National Endowment for the Arts Grant, Commission Proposal Support
- 1995 Arts/ Industry Residency Program, John Michael Kohler Arts Center, Kohler, WI
- 1994 MidAtlantic Arts Foundation Grant, Residency Program, Brodksy Center for Innovative Editions, Rutgers University, New Brunswick, NJ
- 1994 Residency Program, UrbanGlass: New York Center for Contemporary Glass, Brooklyn, NY
- 1992 Arts Partners Program, Lila Wallace-Reader's Digest Fund, New York, NY

== See also ==
- Epoxy Art Group, an art collective Fay co-founded that was active from 1982 to 1992
