= Jerry McDaniel =

American artist

Jerry W. McDaniel
- Jerry McDaniel at FIT/SUNY with As the World Turns, acrylic on 48" circular canvas, NY, 1997
- Born: September 9, 1935; Vinton County, Ohio, U.S.
- Died: March 9, 2023 (aged 87)
- Education: Columbus College of Art and Design (CCAD); New School for Social Research (NSSR); MA in Computer Communication Art from the New York Institute of Technology (NYIT)
- Known for: Heterogeneous art, graphic design, illustration, fine art, abstract painting, and art education
- Notable work: Harlow's posters (Victoria and Albert Museum permanent collection)
- Awards: Life Time Achievement International Broadcast Design Association (BDA)for contributions to education
- Website: jerrywmcdanielstudios.com

Jerry W. McDaniel (September 9, 1935 - March 9, 2023) was an American heterogeneous artist; graphics artist, illustrator, communication designer, educator and modernist painter. He distinguished himself by doing advertising work for numerous large corporations (PanAm, Intercontinental Hotels, Philip Morris International), creating posters, doing book and magazine illustrations, and influencing numerous students of advertising and communication design. In parallel with his commercial career he was a prolific multimedia artist, painting in acrylic and in watercolor, in various fields such as landscape, portraits, sports, and political graphics. He also designed sports stamps. He was one of the first illustrators to embrace computer graphics.

== Early life and education ==
McDaniel was born during the Great Depression on a farm called The Jake White Place on Rabbit Ridge near Zaleski, in Vinton County, Ohio. His father Hoyt Glenn (Ben), a 25-year-old cattle farmer, married Lillian, age 16, in West Virginia three months before Jerry was born. At the beginning of World War II, McDaniel's father, fearing the draft, sold all the livestock and moved the family to Athens, Ohio. After his father died in 1951, his mother moved the family to Logan, Ohio to find employment.

Poster for the 1st discothèque in New York, 1966

McDaniel was a boy scout of Troop 154, Union Furnace, OH and was advanced to the rank of Eagle Scout in 1951. Then he received the Outstanding National Boy Scout Award. He started drawing and painting when he was five years old, encouraged by his parents who had little education. His mother Lillien was an amateur artist. He soon became the artist of the local area. In his senior high school year, McDaniel was an apprentice manager at JCPenney in Logan, OH. The high school art teacher, recognizing his talent and knowing that he had no money to go to school, was the one to make him aware of a scholarship, guide him to prepare a portfolio, and drove to Columbus to file McDaniel's portfolio. Today McDaniel brings his contribution to the Brighten Your Future (BYF) organization (established in 1988) to assist Logan High School graduates in continuing their education by providing financial assistance based on need. McDaniel earned a scholarship to the Columbus College of Art and Design (CCAD). He worked his way through College as a mapmaker for the Ohio State Department of Hydrology. Jerry W. McDaniel is acknowledged by CCAD as one of their notable alumni who played a leadership role in industry. Jerry McDaniel was the first alumnus of CCAD to be offered the Award for Excellence (then called "Award for Outstanding Alumnus"), in 1982. He graduated from CCAD twice, once with a Professional Certificate in 1957 (when the school was called "Columbus Art School") and then with a BFA in 1972 (CCAD).

== Career ==
Moving to New York in July 1957, he worked as a package designer for Continental Can Corporation. McDaniel's first work appeared in Redbook magazine in September 1957. The long-time Dean/President of CCAD, Joseph V. Canzani, was carrying this drawing by McDaniel in his wallet and was showing it to everyone saying "Look what our kids are doing." After military service as a Spec 9 architect, McDaniel returned to New York, becoming a graphic designer/art director for the LW Froehlich Company, a large pharmaceutical advertising agency.

In the summer of 1961, Saul Bass's East Coast agent, Lester Rosin Creative Group, became McDaniel's agent. McDaniel's first commission was a national campaign for Pan Am Airlines. This work appeared full-page every Monday in the New York Times for 52 consecutive weeks, followed by 300 drawings in three months for Intercontinental Hotels, which ran worldwide for three years.

In 1963, he enrolled in the Experimental Workshop at the New School for Social Research (NSSR) taught by Italian artist, and American artist Henry C. Pearson. In 1965, he chaired the Illustrators Annual Show, Society of Illustrators and in 1966 he created the two Harlow's posters, for the 1st discothèque in the world, with the influence of the workshop at the NSSR.

In 1994 Jerry W. McDaniel became Chair of the "Advertising Design Department" (now called "Communication Design Department", FIT/SUNY. He earned an MA in Computer Communication Art from the New York Institute of Technology (NYIT) in 1987. He is a member of The New York Society of Illustrators (SI), Broadcast Designers Association (BDA), The American Institute of graphic Design (AIGA), and The Graphic Artist Guild (GAG). McDaniel's work has been published in many books including "The Illustrator in America" and "Icons and Images."

In 1967, NBC requested paintings from the US Air Force Collection to air during the launching of the Apollo 11 mission. McDaniel has six paintings in the US Air Force Art Collection. NBC selected five pieces, one of which was McDaniel's "Dawn of the Day." The painting was seen on national and international television for 32 minutes of airtime on the Today Show for the Apollo 11 Space Launch.

In 1970, McDaniel was a founding member of the Advertising Design Department at the Fashion Institute of Technology, teaching graphic design at the New York Institute of Technology and lecturing at the Rhode Island School of Design, the School of Visual Arts, the Columbus College of Art and Design, and the Maryland Institute of Art and Design.

In the late 1960s, McDaniel designed and illustrated the complete Zane Grey Western Series for Simon & Schuster, and also created book covers for the S. S. Van Dine "Murder Mystery" series for three different publishers, including Charles Scribner's Sons's over a ten-year period.

Jerry W. McDaniel also created award-winning posters. As the MCCAA Tennis Champion for 1971–72 he was afforded the opportunity to work as a Sports Artist and Designer for Philip Morris. He worked with the famous Spanish tennis player Manolo Santana. For over 25 years McDaniel was commissioned to create sports promotions in South America and Iberia: posters for tennis, Grand Prix racing, horse racing, motocross, bicycling, and others. In the late 1960s he created two Harlow's posters for the 1st discothèque in New York with the same name. Today these posters are in the permanent collection of the Victoria and Albert Museum. In 1971 Anita Grien became McDaniel's agent for the next three decades.

In 1991 he was commissioned to design and illustrate a poster for the Union's Labor March on Washington, August 31, 1991. The Union created a limited edition of 200 signed-by-the artist prints of Jerry W. McDaniel's "Solidarity Works: Solidarity Day '91" poster. An official AFL-CIO special-run artist-signed copy of this print is in the University of Missouri St. Louis Art Collection – "The Bruce & Barbara Feldacker Labor Art Collection", and the Special Collections of the Frostburg State University, Frostburg, MD. McDaniel has also conceived and produced short films and film titles, among them the film ICE (Idea, Composition, and Execution) and the film titles for The Bolshoi at The Bolshoi.

In 2008, the New York Society of Illustrators commemorated the 50th anniversary of their Annual Show by publishing a book entitled Icons and Images: 50 Years of Illustration, containing 500 of the 25,000 illustrations from the Society's Annuals. McDaniel's 1972 Grand Prix Philip Morris International large black & white Harlow's poster was among those selected.

The abstract artworks of McDaniel are in public and private collections around the world. He participated at numerous group shows, and had solo shows in New York, Los Angeles, Palm Springs, California, and Paris, France. In recent years his work was shown in Düsseldorf, Germany, Bucharest, Romania, and he had solo shows in Beverly Hills, California (2012), and the "LOOK AT ME" exhibition at the Valley Performing Arts Center (VPAC) of California State University, Northridge (CSUN), September 18 – October 22, 2013. He is represented by I. C. ART Gallery, Encino, California.

Among his recent achievements he illustrated poems by two well-known Romanian poets, Lucian Blaga and Ana Blandiana; created several videos with about his art; designed posters and promotional graphics for the (AOI) Art of Innovation Conference (2013 & 2014, CSUN); banners for non-profit California organizations (2014 & 2016); the cover of the Art Volume and the design for the poster of "Salon ARTIS 2010", and was a member in the Awards Jury for Best Cinematography at SEEfest (South East European Film Festival), Los Angeles, CA, 2015.

== Family life ==
In 1962, he met and married Renata Buss, a model and former "Miss Berlin". They had two children, a son, Teja, who currently lives with his family in Melbourne, Australia; and a daughter, Saskia, who died in 1999. McDaniel has two grandsons from his son Teja, Tristan and Liam.

After separating from his wife and living several years in New York and Greenwich, Connecticut, McDaniel moved out west in 2004 to Los Angeles, where JW McDaniel Studios was re-located and currently operates in Encino, California. He does illustrations and promotional work, and abstract expressionist art. He also has a studio in Palm Springs, CA and Montparnasse-Paris, France where he spends a few months per year.

== Selected collections ==
McDaniel's works are in numerous collections:

- 9/11 Memorial & Museum, NYC, NY
- American Federation of Labor and Congress of Industrial Organizations (AFL–CIO), Washington, DC
- Bowen House, Logan, OH
- Center for the Study of Political Graphics (CSPG), Culver City, California
- Columbus College of Art and Design, Columbus, OH
- Grumman Corporation, Los Angeles
- International Tennis Hall of Fame, Casino, New Port, RI
- J. Walter Thompson, New York, NY
- Lester Rossin Creative Group, New York, NY
- Metropolitan Museum of Fine Art, New York, NY
- Museum of American Illustration, New York, NY
- Philip Morris International, New York, NY
- Phillip De Rothschild, Paris, France
- Prentice Hall Publisher, New York, NY
- Poster Museum, Chelsea, NYC, NY
- Simon & Schuster, New York, NY
- Smithsonian, Washington DC
- Smithsonian, Washington DC
- Smithsonian, Washington DC
- Society of Illustrators, NYC, NY
- The US Air Force Art Collection] Jerry's work in the US Air Force Art Collection, Pentagon, and the Smithsonian Institution
- University of Missouri St. Louis Art Collection – "The Bruce & Barbara Feldacker Labor Art Collection"]
- Frostburg State University Special Collections, Frostburg, MD]
- Viitorul Roman Society (VCR), Los Angeles, California
- VOD Gourmet Corporation, Greenwich, CT
- Many corporate and private collections in the USA, Europe, and Australia.

== Solo shows ==
- 2011–present I.C. ART Gallery (Palm Spring, CA; Paris, France, Los Angeles, CA, USA)
- 2017 Posters for the Duke Show, Le Bal Blomet, Montparnasse, Paris, France
- 2013 Look at ME, Enamel and Acrylic on Canvas, Valley Performance Arts Center (VPAC), California State University, Northridge (CSUN), Northridge, CA
- 2012 I want to dance, Heterogeneous media, Klein Art Academy, Beverly Hills, CA
- 2008 Streetscapes, Acrylic on Canvas, Nunus Gallery, Paris, France
- 2005 Birds, Pineapples, and Paradise, Computer Art (reviewed by La La Land Press), Woodmere Gallery, Los Angeles CA
- 2004 Jerry's Balls, Acrylic on Acrylic Spheres, Media Loft, New Rochelle, NY
- 2004 Circles, Squares and Triangles, Woodmere Gallery, Los Angeles
- 1999 Retrospective, Mixed Media (over 150 works), Media Loft, New Rochelle, NY
- 1996 Electric Art, Buss Gallery, Greenwich, CT
- 1992 Art in Sports, Columbus College of Art and Design, Columbus, Ohio
- 1991 12 International Sports Posters, Fashion Institute of Technology (FIT)/SUNY, New York, NY
- 1985 Bird of Paradise, Computer Art, American Museum of Illustration, New York, NY
- 1984 Six Graphics, The Museum of American Illustrations, New York Society of Illustrators, New York, NY
- 1983 Marlboro Sports Art, Posters, Philip Morris International, New York, NY
- 1980 Urban Landscapes, Enamel on Circular Canvas (reviewed), Sky Gallery, New York, NY
- 1980 Florenze, Dyanson Galleries, Soho, New York, NY
- 1979 International Tennis Posters, MTC, New York, NY
- 1978 Art On Display, Drawing Silk Screened on Plastic Panels, Society of Illustration, New York, NY
- 1976 The Art of Jerry McDaniel, Mixed Media, NY Society of Illustrators, New York, NY
- 1973 Beachscapes, Opaque Watercolor, Buss Gallery, Greenwich, CT
- 1972 Retrospective, House Paint and Enamels on Canvas, Pratt Institute, Brooklyn, NY
- 1971 Circles, House Paint and Enamels on Canvas, Galleries at the Fashion Institute of Technology (FIT)/SUNY, New York, NY
- 1970 Squares, Bruce Fredric Gallery, New York, NY
- 1969 Rectangles, House Paint on Masonite, Jefferson Gallery, New York, NY
- 1967 Book Covers, Mixed Media, NY Society of Illustrators, New York, NY

== Group shows ==
- 2003 911, New York Times Exhibition, Museum of American Illustration, New York, NY
- 2003–2006 Member's Exhibitions, Museum of American Illustration, New York, NY
- 2004 Open Studios (invitational, sponsored by the Halberg Gallery SUNY Purchase), Media Loft, New Rochelle, NY
- 1991–2002 Our Own Show, New York Society of Illustrators, New York, NY
- 1992–1996 Faculty Fine Arts Exhibitions FIT/SUNY, New York, NY
- 1965–93 Illustrators National Annual (juried), Society of Illustrators, New York, NY
- 1990,67,60 Annual Exhibition (juried), Art Directors International Annual, New York, NY
- 1990 The Inter-Governmental Philatelic Stamp Exhibition (invitational), Museum of American Illustration, New York, NY
- 1990 The Illustrator as a Printmaker, Museum of American Illustrator, New York, NY
- 1987 NYIT Artteck’87 (first major Computer Art Exhibition in New York), Master Eagle Gallery, New York, NY
- 1986–1990 Open Studios, Loft Artist Association, Stamford, CT
- 1986 The Graphic Eye '86, Women in Communications, New Haven, CT
- 1986 Fifth Annual Pacific Northwest Computer Graphics Conference,(invitational), University of Oregon, Oregon
- 1986 Computer as an Art Tool (invitational), Hurllbutt Gallery, Greenwich, CT
- 1986 Art and Design Faculty Show, The Fashion Institute of Technology (FIT)/SUNY, New York, NY
- 1985 Arttech’85, NYIT, Old Westbury, NY
- 1985 The Connecticut Illustrator (invitational), New Canaan Society for the Arts, CT
- 1982 International Graphics Competition and Exhibition, Portland, OR
- 1982 Dyanson Gallery – Soho, New York, NY
- 1981 Jameson Gallery – Soho, New York, NY
- 1981 A Pictorial History, US Air Force, Museum of American Illustration, New York, NY
- 1980 Stein Gallery, Group Show, New York, NY
- 1979 FIT/SUNY Faculty Graphic Design Exhibition (juried), New York, NY
- 1978 FIT/SUNY Faculty Fine Art Exhibition (juried), New York, NY
- 1978 International Graphics Awards Annual (IGA) (juried, Gold Medal), Oregon
- 1976 Art in Sports, Madison Square Garden Gallery, New York, NY
- 1975 Ten Illustrators, Society of Illustrators, New York, NY
- 1974 24 Famous American Artists, Littleneck Library Gallery, Littleneck, LI
- 1972 Pentagon Collection (selected works), National Gallery, Washington DC
- 1970 National Show, Museum of American Illustration, New York, NY
- 1968 The Armed Forces of The United States, as seen by the Contemporary Artist, Smithsonian Institution, Washington, DC
- 1957 Northwest Territory Watercolor Exhibition, Ohio University, Athens, OH
- 1956 Mississippi Mistress – Massillon Open (invitational), Massillon, OH

== Bibliography ==
- The United States Air Force Art Collection – Jerry McDaniel 6 paintings
- Move aside, Mad Men Columbus College of Art and Design
- Elizabeth A. Sheehan "Jerry W. McDaniel and Creativity: Illustrator vs. Designer vs. Commissioned Artist”, American Romanian Academy of Arts and Sciences, Arts and Humanities, Journal New Series, 26.1, 2018
- Elizabeth A. Sheehan “Jerry W. McDaniel and Creativity: Illustrator vs. Designer vs. Commissioned Artist", American Romanian Academy of Arts and Sciences, Abstracts, Proceeding, p. 63, The 42nd ARA Congress, Iasi, Romania, 2018*
- Meridianul Romanesc, No. 565, June 14, 2008, California.
- Jerry W. McDaniel "My Philosophy as an Art Educator", American Romanian Academy of Arts and Sciences, Abstracts, Proceeding, p. 63, The 42nd ARA Congress, Iasi, Romania, 2018.
- Ileana Costea and Jerry McDaniel, Romanian Flavor of an American Painter, Proceedings, p. 136,, The 39th ARA Congress, Frascat/Roma, Italy 2015.
- Sports and Stamps. An Olympic Combination. Arts – Connecticut Time, December 7, 1988.
- The First Picture Show. Arielle Emmet, Graphics Portfolio. Computer Graphics World (CGW), July 1986.
- When Mind and Machine Meet. Advertising Techniques and Graphic Arts], Vol. 21, No. 2, Issue 220, Summer 1986.
- High-tech Images on View in Greenwich. William Zimmer, The New York Times, Sunday, April 13, 1986.
- Computer as Art. Hurlbutt Gallery, Greenwich. Art-Theater-The Lively Arts, Connecticut Magazine, p. 54, April 1986.
- The Armed Forces of the United States as Seen by Contemporary Artists (Smithsonian Publication 4730), Smithsonian Institution Press, Washington, DC, 1968.
- The Illustrators and Their Lively Art, Robert Ostermann, The National Observer, Washington, DC, 1967.
