= Jerry Kwan =

Hong Kong artist (1934–2008)

Jerry Kwan (Chinese: 關晃, 1934–2008) is a Hong Kong artist, Born in Xinhui, Guangdong in 1934, in southern China, Kwan moved to Hong Kong in 1949. He started painting during the 1960s and the 1970s. While Kwan did not work with just one single style in his artworks, his main focus was on oil paintings.

In 1972, Kwan moved to the United States to study Art and Design. He lived and worked in New York City. Kwan returned to Hong Kong in 1997 and taught at Hong Kong Polytechnic University.

He received awards from the Ford Foundation for excellent works in 1978 and National Endowment for the Arts Fellowship for artists (1995/96) in the U.S.

Since 1971, Kwan has organized several solo exhibitions in Hong Kong and New York and group exhibitions in Hong Kong, Korea, the United States and Macau. In 2000, Kwan worked in Fanling studio and worked as part-time tutor in Chinese University in 2001.

== Early life ==
In Mr. Jerry Kwan's early life, he used oil painting to be his major medium expression to himself. In the 1970s, he left for the United States for further studies in fine arts and graduate in the Columbus College of Art and Design, Ohio, and the Syracuse University, New York. He stayed in US around twenty years. And he joined many exhibitions that were awarded the National Endowment for the Arts Fellowship in 1995. In 1997, he came back to Hong Kong. As well as his painting, he also became a mentor in Polytechnic University, the Art School of Hong Kong Arts Centre and the Chinese University of Hong Kong.

In May 2008, Kwan died. His friends in the painting community and his students remember him by holding an exhibition for him. The exhibition would display works of Mr. Kwan, many are shown with the consent of galleries and friends, as well as related articles, photos and information. It would not only provide a broad view of the creations of Mr. Kwan, a core figure of the art scene, but also an opportunity to look at the life of a committed artist.

== Career: Art and design ==
Dedicated to his life to art making, Jerry used oil painting as his major medium of expression in his artwork. He claimed that he had no interest to create his artwork with strong individualistic. Also, he did not have the fixed topics and ideas in his artwork because he attempted to find out new topics and ideas for his artwork in his lifetime. Long Tin has described Jerry as an artist who lures people to misread him and his artwork.

You can get the meaning of different social issues from the artwork of Jerry. For example, he made the series of the artwork of insert to represent different social issues at that time after his return to Hong Kong in 2000s.

== Award ==
1978- Ford Foundation for excellent works 1995/6 National Endowment for The Arts' Fellowship for artists, USA

== Profession ==
1997-98 Guest lecturer at School of Design, Hong Kong Polytechnic University 1998-2004 Part-time tutor at the Hong Kong Arts Centre/RMIT 2001- Part-time tutor at Department of Fine Arts, Chinese University

== Education ==
- 1972- Certificate in art and design, Extramural Department, the University of Hong Kong
- 1976- B.F.A from Columbus College of Art and Design, Ohio
- 1978- M.F.A. From Syracuse University, Syracuse, New York

== Solo exhibition ==
- 1971- City Hall Gallery, Hong Kong
- 1972- American Library, Hong Kong
- 1983- Mao Lee Gallery, Soho, NY
- 1993- "Corner of a Metropolis", Soho Space, NY
- 1994- "Undergroundscape", the 456 Gallery, Soho, NY
- 1995- "City Light", Trigram Gallery, Hong Kong
- 2004- "Folk Art", 21 Loft, Fo Tan, Hong Kong
- 2006- "Pseudo-Folk-Art", Grotto Fine Art Ltd, Hong Kong
- 2006- 1a space, Cattle Depot Artist Village, Hong Kong
- 2008- "Memorial Exhibition", The Pao Gallery, Hong Kong Arts Centre, HK

== Selected group exhibition ==
- 1972-"2nd International Biennial Exhibition of Prints", Seoul, Korea
- 1972-"Art Now Hong Kong", Evansville Museum, Evansville, Indiana
- 1973-"Contemporary Prints", Art Museum of Hong Kong
- 1976-"Annual Art Exhibition ", Columbus Art Museum, Columbus, Ohio
- 1977-"May Show", Munson William Protor Museum, Utica, New York
- 1978-"May Show", Everson Museum, Syracuse, New York
- 1978-"Graduation Show", Joe and Emily Lowe Gallery, Syracuse, NY
- 1985-"Epoxy Group Show", Catherine Gallery, NYC
- 1985-"Root to Reality", Henry Street Art Centre, NYC
- 1985-"The City's", Asian American Institute, NYC
- 1994-"Artist Select", Art Space, Soho, NY
- 1995-"Chinese Artists in US", the Rotunda Gallery, Exchange Square, HK
- 1996-" Alumni Exhibition ", Columbus Art Museum, Columbus, Ohio
- 1997-"Hong Kong Artists", Macau Cultural Centre, Macau
- 1998-"VSA Current Show", Fung Ping Shan Museum, HK
- 1999-"Painting Hong Kong", 1a space, Oil Street, HK
- 2000-"Biennial Exhibition ", Museum of Hong Kong
- 2001-"Three Person Show", Pao Gallery, Hong Kong Arts Centre
- 2001-"The Art School Opening Show", the Art School, HK
- 2003-"Fo Tan Art", at Loft 21 Art Space, Fo Tan, HK
