= Laurie Kutchins =

American poet

Laurie Kutchins is an American poet.

== Life ==
She grew up in Wyoming. She graduated from Carleton College, and from the University of Massachusetts Amherst's MFA Program for Poets & Writers.

She is a Professor in the English Department at James Madison University. She has also been a visiting writer at the University of New Mexico, and a faculty member of the Taos Summer Writers Conference.

Her work appeared in The New Yorker, The Georgia Review, Ploughshares, The Kenyon Review, The Southern Review, Poetry, West Branch, Denver Quarterly, and LIT.

She lives in Singers Glen, Virginia.

== Awards ==
- Isabella Gardner Award for Poetry
- Texas Tech University Press First Book Award (1993)

== Fellowships and grants ==
- Two fellowships from the Virginia Council on the Arts
- Two fellowships from the Pennsylvania Commission on the Arts
- Educational Leave and Research grants from James Madison University
- MacDowell Colony residency
- Ucross Foundation residency
- Virginia Center for the Creative Arts residency

== Books ==
- Slope of the Child Everlasting: Poems. BOA Editions, Ltd. 2007. ISBN 978-1-929918-91-1.
- The Night Path. BOA Editions. 1997. ISBN 978-1-880238-49-3.
- Between Towns. Texas Tech University. 1993. ISBN 978-0-89672-296-5.

=== Anthologies ===
- A Tough and Tender Kinship (anthology)
- Mark Tredinnick, ed. (2003). A Place on Earth: Nature Writers from North America and Australia. UNSW Press. ISBN 978-0-86840-654-1.
