= Lucius Kutchin =

American artist (1901–1936)

- Born: Lucius Brown; October 11, 1901; Macarthur, Ohio, United States
- Died: November 10, 1936 (aged 35); Columbus, Ohio, United States
- Other names: Lucius Brown Kutchin, Lou Kutchin
- Education: Columbus Art School, Pennsylvania Academy of the Fine Arts
- Occupation: Visual artist
- Known for: Painter

Lucius Kutchin (né Lucius Brown; October 11, 1901 – November 10, 1936) was an American modernist painter known for his portraits, landscapes, and still lifes. He was also known as Lou Kutchin and Lucius Brown Kutchin.

== Early life ==
Kutchin was born Lucius Brown, most likely in Macarthur, Ohio, and grew up in New Straitsville. His parents were Americus Lee Brown and Hattie Bratton Brown. His mother died when he was 13, and Lucius went to live with relatives, eventually being adopted informally by Emma Louise Kutchin, who lived in Columbus, Ohio and was a longtime supporter of the arts in that city.

He got some initial art training even before he became a student at the Columbus Art School, where he studied with Alice Schille and Charles Rosen between 1921 and 1924. He also studied at the Pennsylvania Academy of the Fine Arts in Philadelphia between 1922 and 1928, where he won the Packard Prize for one of his drawings (1925), and two back-to-back Cresson Traveling Scholarships (1927–1928) for foreign travel and study. He spent time in France and Italy. Among his mentors at the Pennsylvania Academy were Arthur Beecher Carles, Henry Breckenridge, Henry McCarter, and Daniel Garber. The greatest influence on Kutchin's mature style came from the painter John Carroll, whom Kutchin met in the early 1920s.

== Career ==
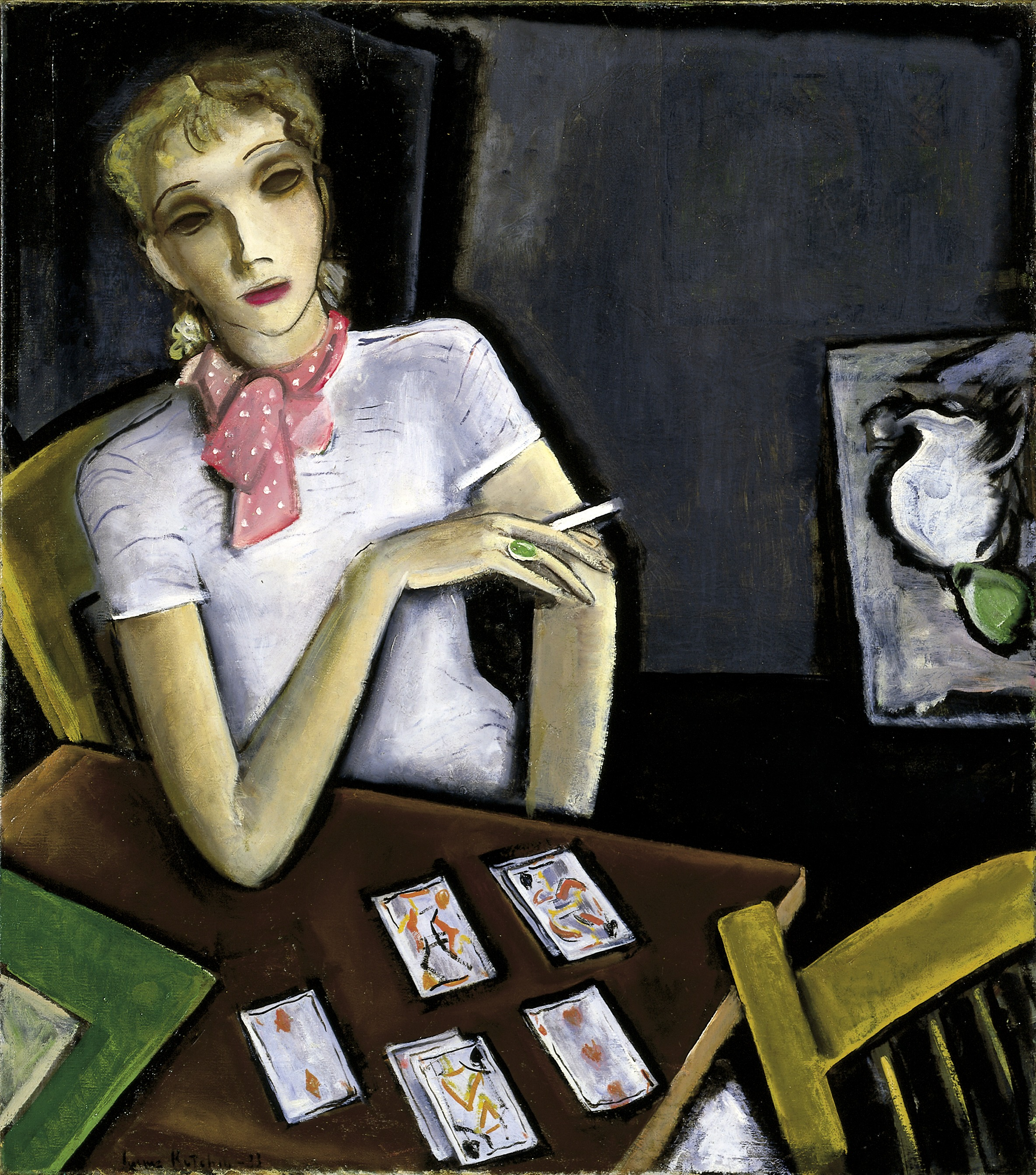
Girl with Cards by Lucius Kutchin, 1933.

Kutchin mostly painted portraits, figure studies, landscapes, and still lifes in oil. He worked in an expressive modernist idiom dominated by a sense of melancholy, using a dark and muted palette. The sitters for his portraits and figure studies are painted in a stylized way that conveys the sense less of an individual person than of a general type. Typically outlined against their backgrounds and looking down and away from the viewer, they often seem emotionally isolated and unapproachable. He is known to have made some of his own picture frames, painting them to visually integrate them with the artwork.

He also made a number of monotypes, often adding to them with pencil, pastel, or crayon after the print was pulled. His monotypes are lighter in feeling than his oils, with strong and graceful line work. The subjects for these included women's heads and horses in motion. He was commissioned to paint several murals as part of the Public Works of Art Project, such as Youth (now lost), at the South High School in Columbus.

From 1928 to 1931, Kutchin lived in the Southwest, settling near Santa Fe, New Mexico, where his mature painting style developed and he became known as one of the New Mexico Modernists. His work keyed into what he perceived as the spiritual aspects of the landscape there. Even after he left New Mexico, it remained an inspiration for some of his paintings, although he only visited it once again, in the summer of 1935.

In 1931 he moved back to Columbus, Ohio, where he was active in the Columbus Art League, serving on exhibition committees and exhibiting work in the League's annual shows. In 1934, he became the Sunday art editor of the Columbus Dispatch, writing a bylined column of art criticism. He exhibited regularly at a range of different local venues from 1932 on, gaining reputation in part as a member of "The New Group," which comprised seven of the city's most avant-garde artists. He also exhibited nationally, taking part in group shows in New York, Chicago, Washington, D.C., and other cities. In 1933 he gained a New York art dealer, Milch Gallery.

Kutchin spent the summer of 1936 in Gloucester, Massachusetts. In the fall of that year, he contracted a fatal case of bronchial pneumonia and died on November 10.

Towards the end of his life, Kutchin was beginning to gain a national reputation, with one-person shows in Detroit and Boston. When he died, he was preparing for an upcoming solo show at Milch Gallery. After he died, however, interest in his small oeuvre lapsed for several decades. In 1988, Kutchin was the subject of a retrospective solo exhibition at the Columbus Museum of Art, which holds a dozen of his paintings and monotypes. He has also been included in a number of survey shows.

== Selected exhibitions ==
- "Exhibition of Five Columbus Painters." Columbus Gallery of Fine Arts, 1936. Group show.
- “Personal Mythologies: Columbus Painter Lucius Kutchin, 1901-1936.” Columbus Museum of Art, 1988. Solo show.
- "100 Years of Art: Celebrating Columbus' Legacy." Ohio Arts Council's Riffe Gallery, 2012. Group show.
- "Authentic Narratives: Ohio’s Regionalists, 1915-1950." Springfield Museum of Art, 2016. Group show.
- "Against the Grain: Modernism in the Midwest". Massillon Museum, 2010. Group show.

== Selected works ==
- Atalaya-Above Santa Fe, 1936. Oil on board. Collection of the Columbus Museum of Art.
- Boy with Guitar–Santa Fe, 1936. Oil on masonite. Collection of the Columbus Museum of Art.
- Girl with Cards, 1933. Collection of the National Museum of American Art, Smithsonian Institution.
- Girl in Green, ca. 1932. Oil on masonite. Collection of the National Museum of American Art, Smithsonian Institution.
- Landscape, New Mexico, 1931. Oil on masonite. Collection of the Columbus Museum of Art.
- Mexican Boy in Striped Sweater, 1929. Oil on board. Collection of Schumacher Gallery, Capital University.
- Portrait of Harriett Evans (nee Heller), ca. 1920. Collection of the Columbus Museum of Art.
