= Columbus College of Art and Design =

Private art school in Columbus, Ohio, U.S.

Coordinates: 39°57′54″N 82°59′24″W

- Motto: Think. Do. Thrive.
- Type: Private art school
- Established: January 6, 1879; 147 years ago
- Affiliations: AICAD
- President: Melanie Corn
- Faculty: 180 full-time
- Undergraduates: 900
- Postgraduates: 32
- Location: Columbus, Ohio, United States
- Campus: Urban
- Colors: Red and White
- Website: www.ccad.edu

Columbus College of Art & Design (CCAD) is a private art school in Columbus, Ohio, United States. It was founded in 1879 as the Columbus Art School and is one of the oldest private art and design colleges in the United States. Located in downtown Columbus, CCAD's campus consists of 11 buildings (including 2 residence halls) on 9 acres (36,000 m^{2}) and is adjacent to the Columbus Museum of Art. Approximately 900 full-time students are enrolled.

== History ==
=== Early history: 1879–1930 ===
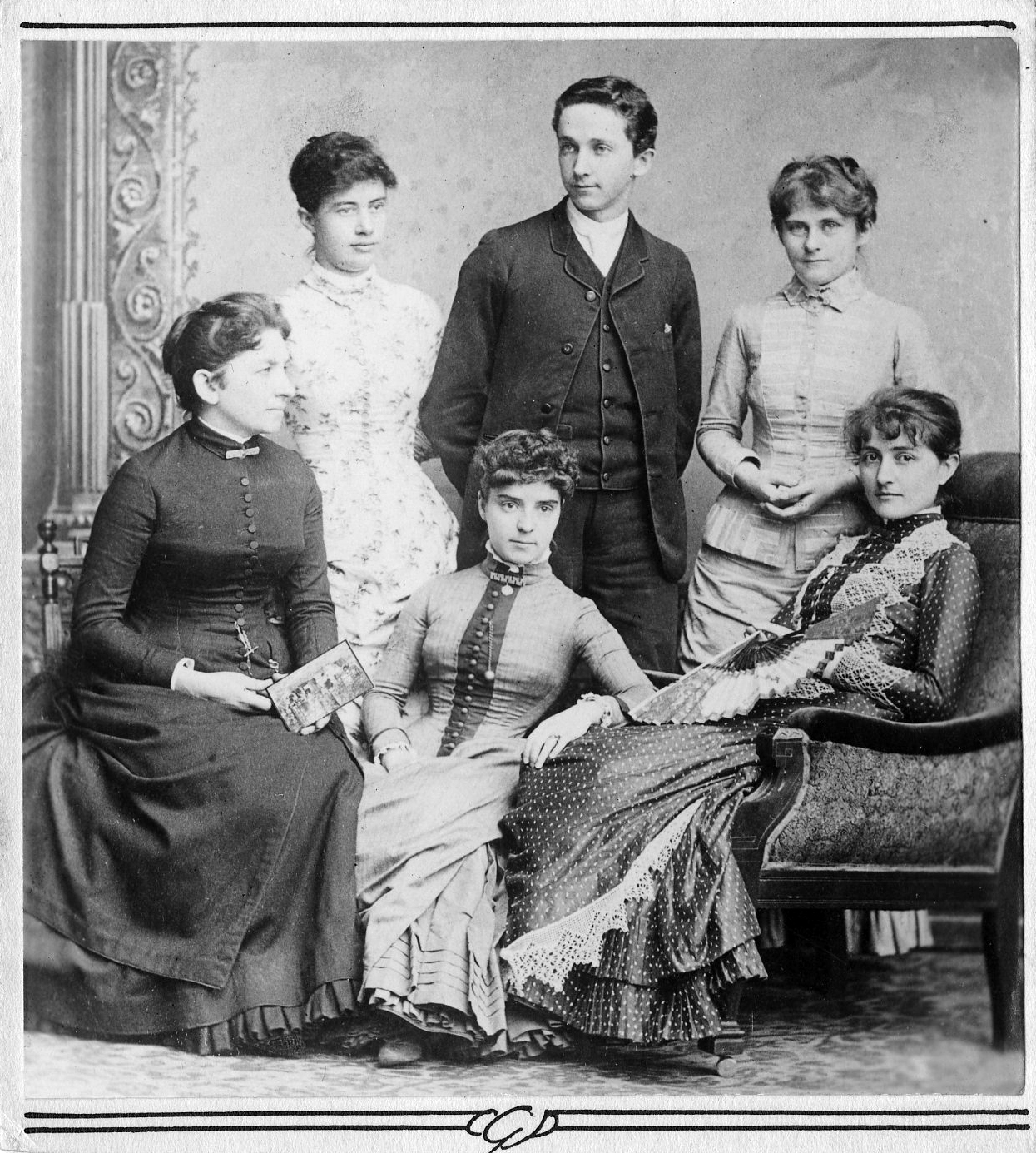
First graduating class at CCAD

CCAD was founded in 1879 as the Columbus Art School. The idea for the school started in 1878, when a group of women formed the Columbus Art Association. Their main concern became creating an art school in Columbus. The first day of classes was January 6, 1879, on the top floor of the Sessions Building at Long and High. Use of that floor had been donated by Francis Sessions, an art-minded banker and entrepreneur, and one of the first trustees of the Columbus Gallery of Fine Arts. There were only three students and one teacher at the time. By the end of the school year, there were 118 students. Original classes included drawing, watercolor, art needlework, oil painting, clay modeling, china painting, and mechanical drawing. Soon after opening, the school added classes like sculpture and figure drawing with clothed models, as nude models were considered too risqué in Columbus at the time. In 1885, the school moved to the Tuller Building at Gay and Fourth St due to the poor ventilation and vapors rising from the Troy Steam Laundry on the floors below the school in the Sessions Block.

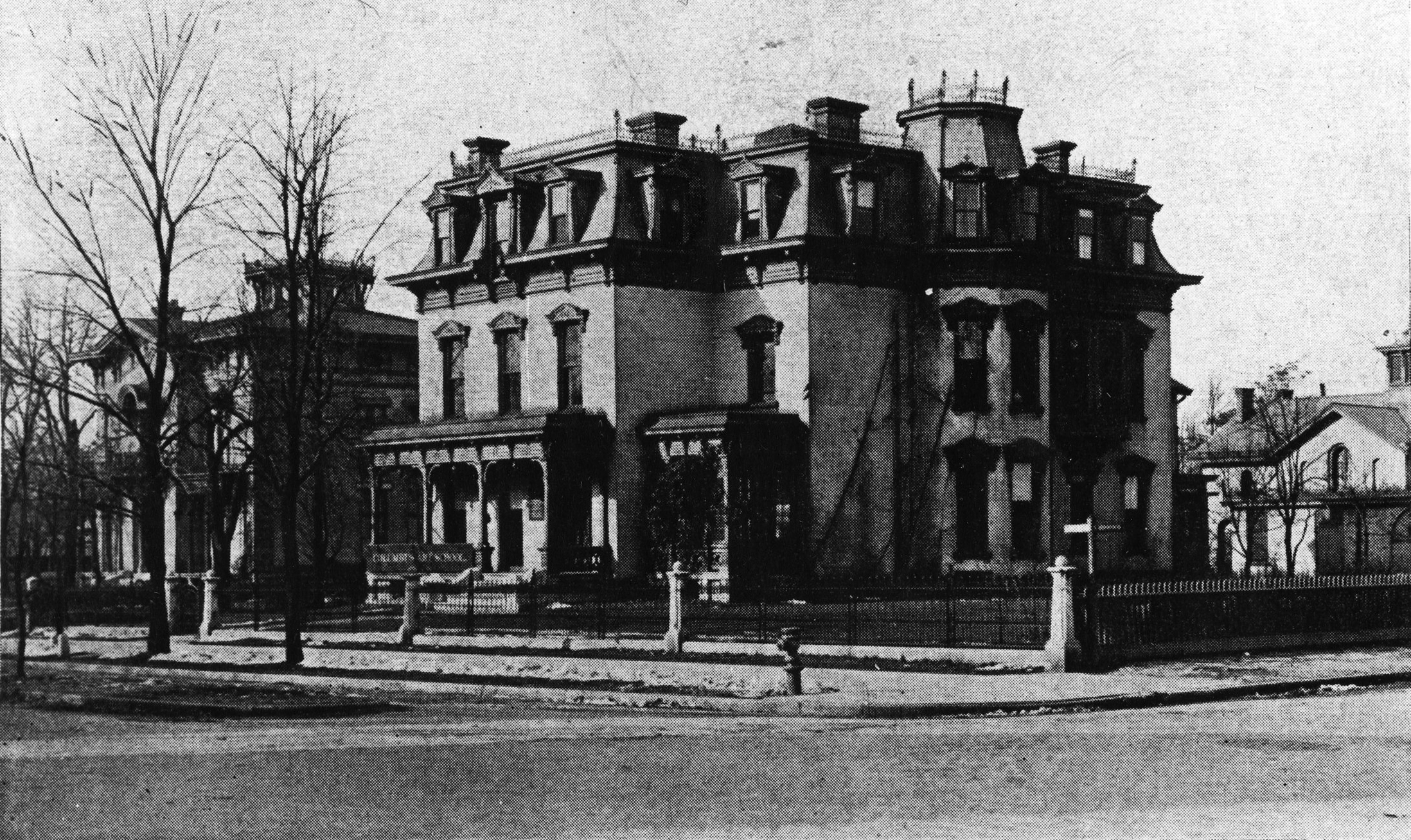
Monypeny Mansion

In his will, Francis Sessions left his house to serve as a space for the gallery and also left a large sum of money to build a better space for the gallery and for the continuation of the Columbus Art School. The school moved two more times before 1914, when it moved into the Monypeny Mansion next to the Sessions House. In 1923, the school, which had been run by the Columbus Art Association but funded by the gallery, merged into one board. Through this merger, the Columbus Art Association became extinct, and the trustees of the gallery created a school committee board. Among the faculty at this time was painter Alice Schille.

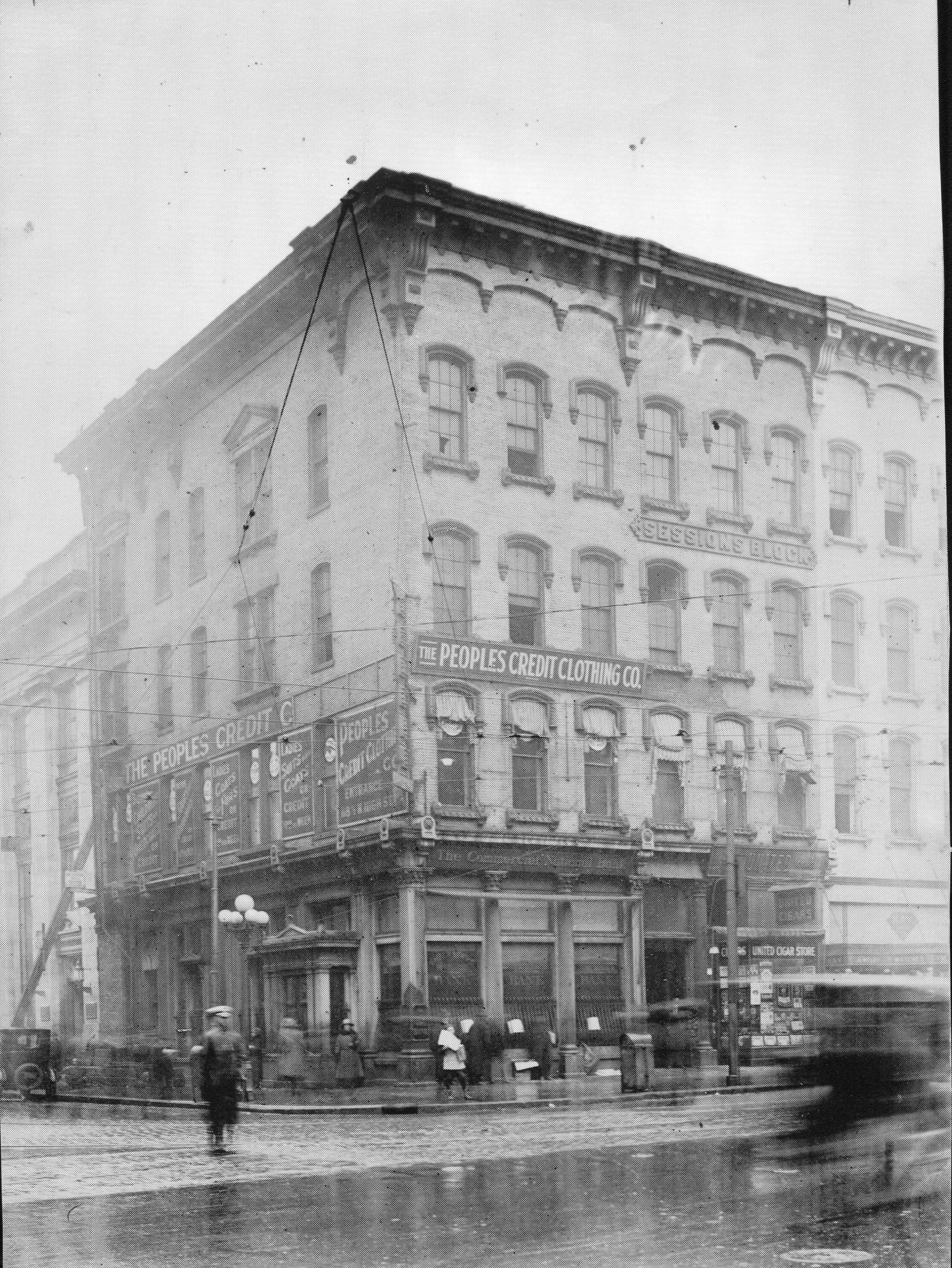
The Sessions Block

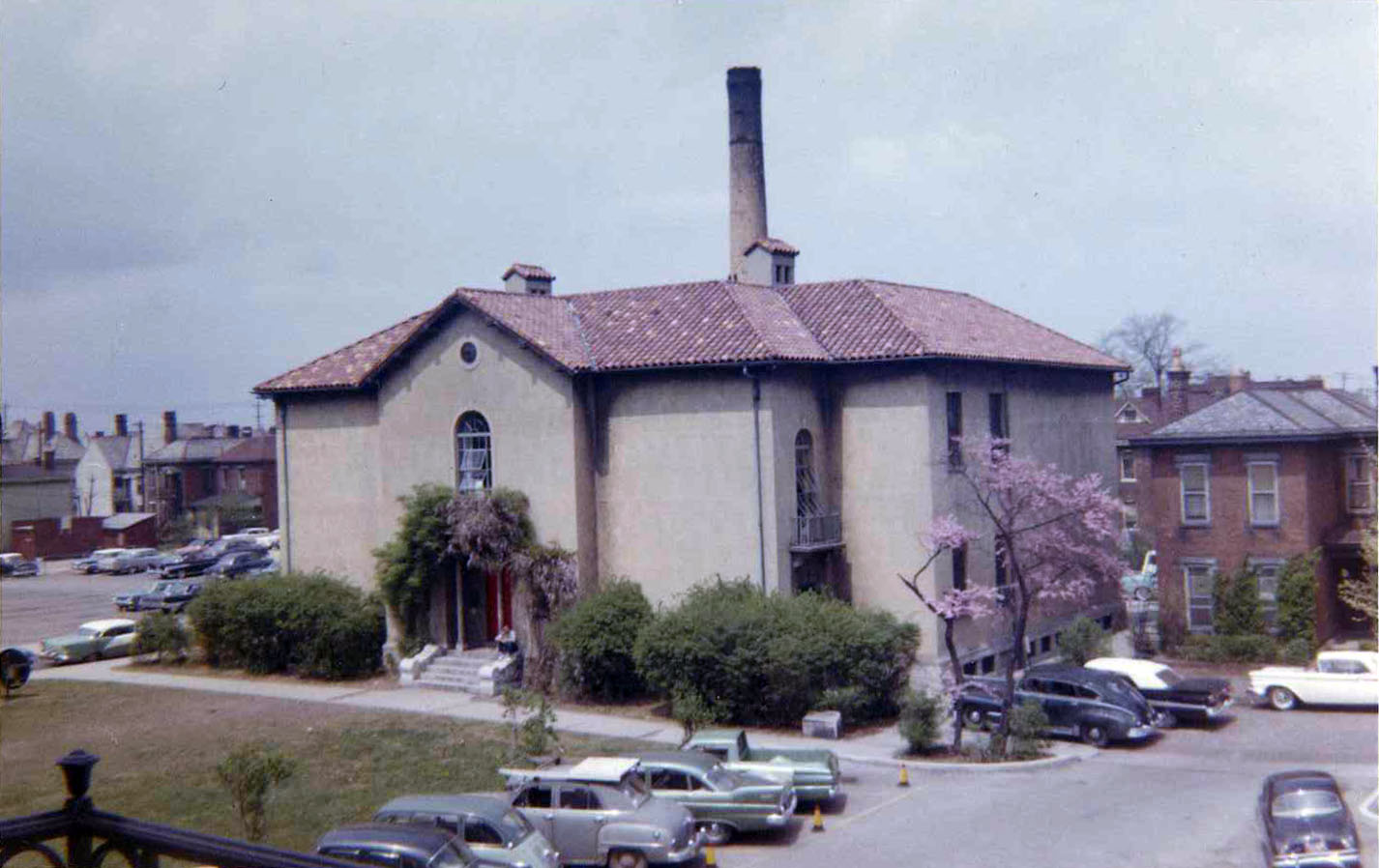
Beaton Hall, taken from the Columbus Museum of Art (1960s)

In 1929, Ralph Beaton, a trustee of the gallery, donated $30,000 to build the first new building for the Columbus Art School. The Sessions House and Monypeny Mansion were torn down to make way for Beaton Hall and a new Columbus Gallery of Fine Arts building. Beaton Hall was completed and held its first classes in 1930. At this time, first-year required courses were drawing, watercolor painting, color theory and practice, modeling, anatomy, composition, perspective drawing, design, lettering, and illustrative advertising. By 1944–45, the day school was discontinued because of World War II, but the evening school had been expanded.

=== Presidency of Joseph Canzani: 1948–1995 ===
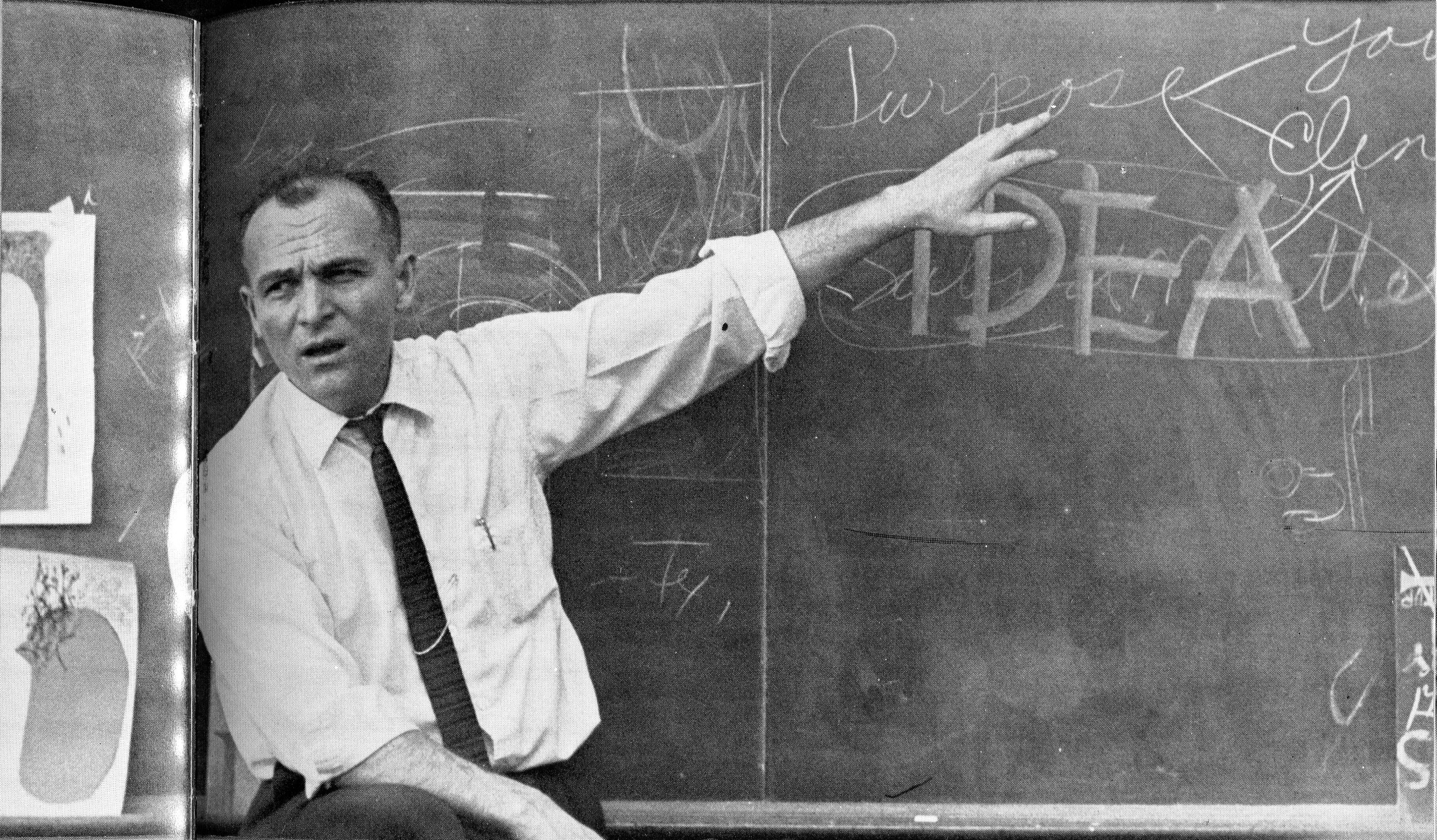
Joseph Canzani, from the 1960 yearbook

Joseph Canzani started as a teacher at the school in 1948. By 1950, there were only 13 day school students, and Canzani was the only faculty member. Canzani was asked by the museum director to become Dean. As Dean, Canzani put together introductory courses in drawing, color theory, and design principles. Canzani also taught some of the foundation classes.

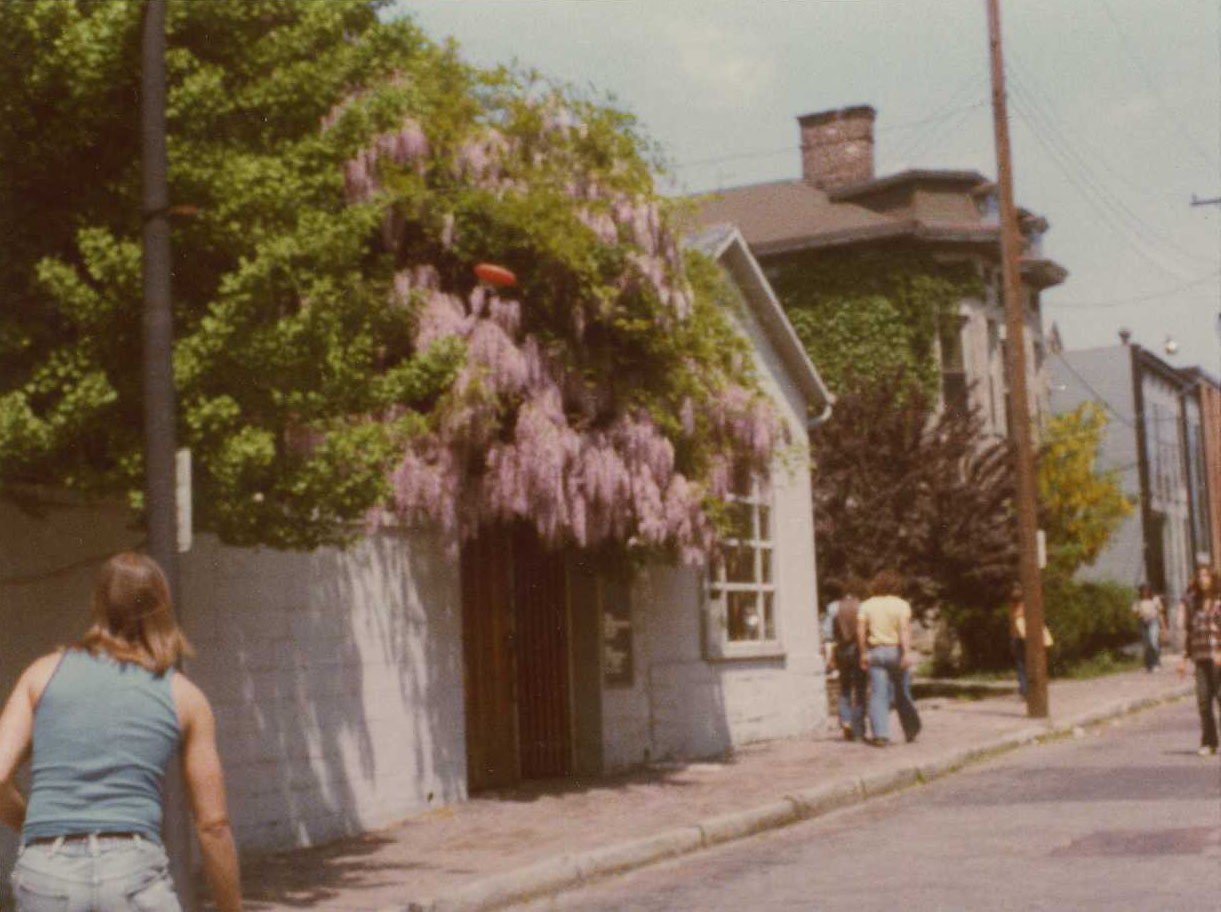
Hutton Place, May 1975

In 1959, Canzani changed the name from the Columbus Art School to the Columbus College of Art & Design. By the 1960s, the school had grown to 850 full-time students. The college bought the houses surrounding the school, starting with six houses on Hutton Place. In 1962, students picketed in front of the Columbus Museum of Art for the college to become a degree-granting institution. At the time, the school only gave out a professional certificate of completion. The students ended their 24-hour picketing when the board announced that they would seek accreditation. In 1969, CCAD received authorization from the Ohio Board of Regents to grant the Bachelor of Fine Arts degree. In 1975, Kinney Hall (then called V-Hall) was completed. It was the second building to be built specifically for the school, for $2.5 million. This was followed by the renovation and conversion of a former Cadillac plant into Battelle Hall in 1978.

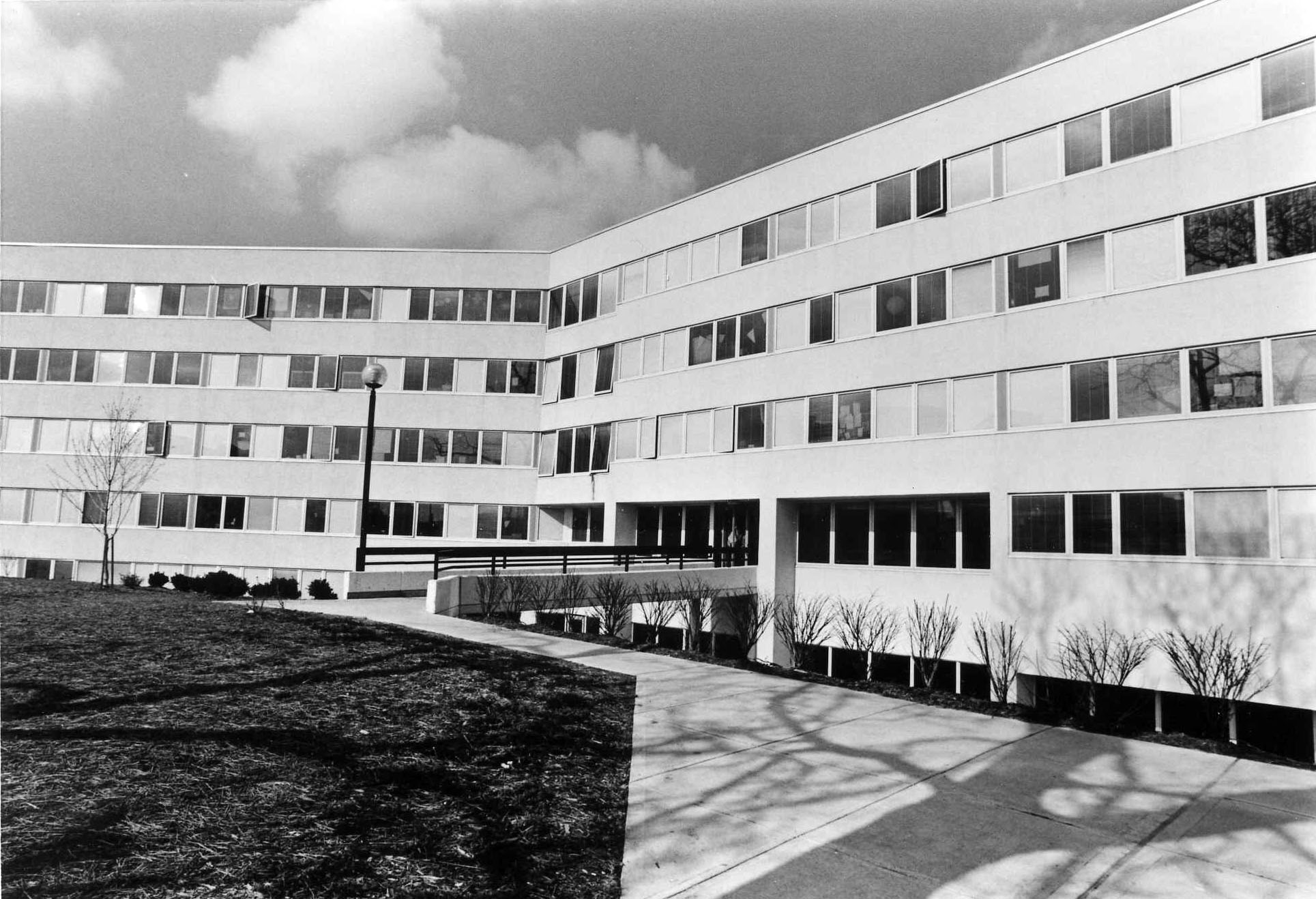
Schottenstein Residence Hall

In 1976, CCAD was granted accreditation by the National Association of Schools of Art. In June 1979, Canzani became the first President of CCAD. In 1981, after 58 years of being run by the Columbus Museum of Art, CCAD separated from the CMA. Canzani returned from a meeting in Kansas City to learn that the museum's board was on the verge of merging CCAD with Franklin University. The trustees thought that the merger would put CCAD on better financial ground, but Canzani thought it would ruin the school. Canzani rallied faculty members and students to protest the board's actions. The board abandoned its plans to merge. Canzani requested that CCAD become independent of the CMA, and by 1982, the separation was complete.

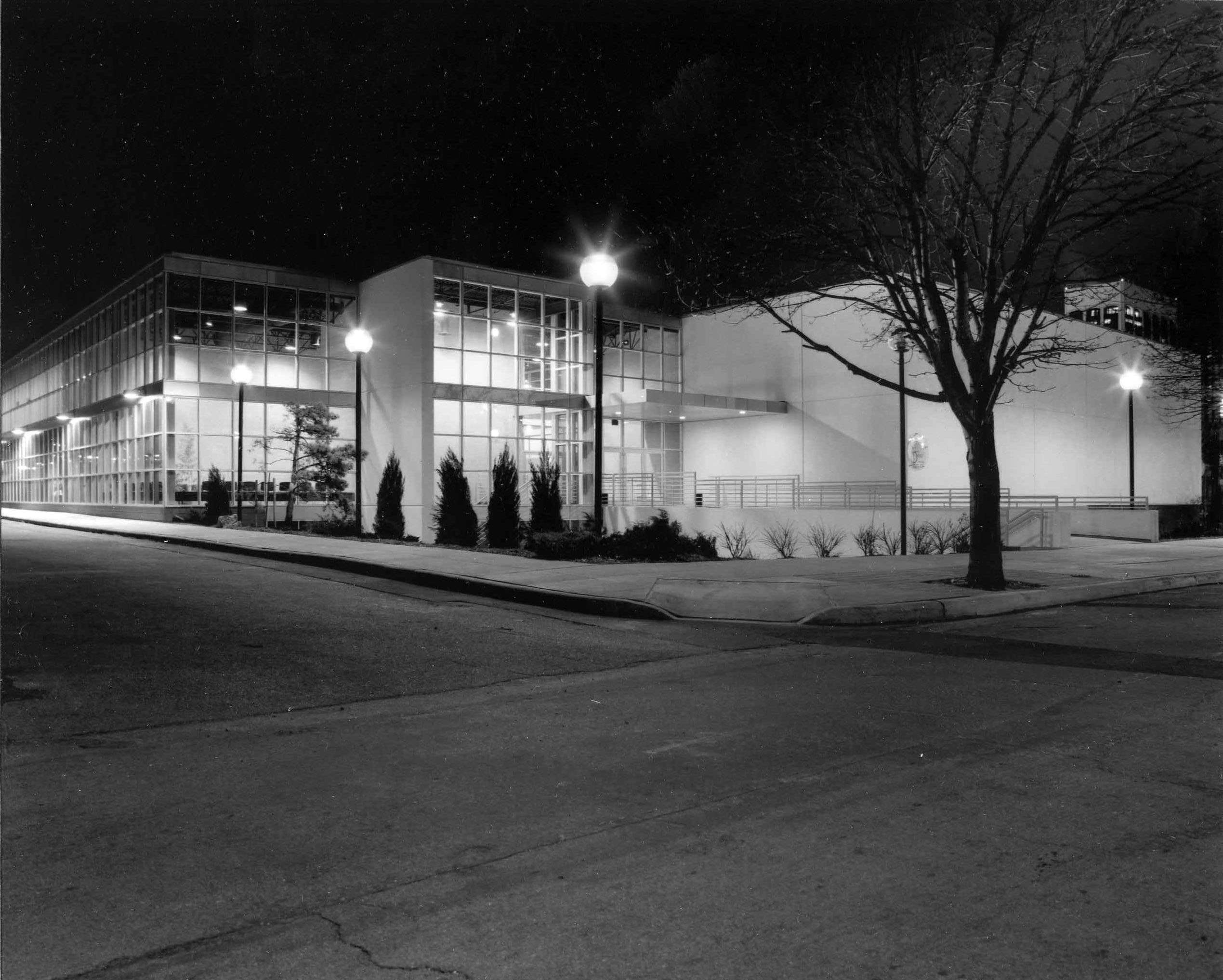
Joseph V. Canzani Center, 1992

The Schottenstein Residence Hall was completed in 1985 as the first campus dorm. CCAD bought many of the houses on Cleveland Avenue between Long and Gay, converting them into classrooms and offices. In 1995, Canzani retired after 47 years. The Joseph V. Canzani Center, the last new building to be built during his presidency, was completed in 1991. The Canzani Center holds the CCAD Packard Library, an auditorium, and a 15,000-square-foot gallery.

=== Presidency of Dennison Griffith: 1998–2014 ===
In 1998, Dennison (Denny) W. Griffith was chosen as the college's president.

By 2001, the school had a 17-building, 9-acre campus. On June 23, 2001, the 100-foot-high, 101-foot-wide, 24,000-pound ART sign was erected, spanning Gay Street on campus. The sculpture was designed by Doris Schlayn of Artglo Company and donated to the school.

The Loann Crane Center for Design was built in 2005, replacing the old student center, and its adjacent quad replaced a parking lot.

In 2006, CCAD bought the Byers Building, a 1920s auto dealership at the corner of Broad Street and Cleveland Avenue, for $4.5 million. The building was converted into offices, classrooms, and studios and renamed the Design Studios on Broad (DSB). DSB also houses the MFA Program. The first MFA class graduated in 2012.

In 2009, the Design Square Apartments were completed. This new building replaced the older houses on Cleveland Avenue that had previously repurposed for use by CCAD. Design Square Apartments offers housing to 200 graduate students, upperclassmen, and some freshmen.

In 2013, Griffith announced that he would be retiring on June 30, 2014. Under his tenure, the college doubled the size of its campus. The school also debuted a new curricular model that splits the majors into two schools, the School of Design Arts and the School for Studio Arts. Its finalized form launched in the Fall of 2014. Griffith died in January 2016.

=== Presidency of Tom White: 2014–2015 ===
The board of trustees named the Industrial designer and branding expert Tom White as Griffith's successor. He served as president between June 24, 2014, and March 3, 2015.

=== Presidency of Dr. Melanie Corn: 2016–present ===
In December 2015, CCAD's board of trustees named Dr. Melanie Corn as the school's new president. She is the first woman to serve as president in the university's 140-year history, and is one of only six women serving as president among the AICAD member institutions.

== Academics ==
CCAD awards a Bachelor of Fine Arts degree in 9 undergraduate majors. It also awards one graduate degree: a Master of Professional Studies in User Experience Design.

=== Community classes ===
Through its Saturday Morning Art Classes, Evening Art Classes, Creative Summer Workshops, and College Preview program, the college offers a wide variety of community classes for all ages, including children and youth in grades 1–12 and adults.

=== Accreditation ===
CCAD is accredited by the National Association of Schools of Art and Design (NASAD) and the Higher Learning Commission.

== Student life ==
CCAD has a diverse student body that comes from a variety of ethnic, national, and socioeconomic backgrounds. Its 17-acre urban campus is located in the heart of downtown Columbus and is within walking distance to the Columbus Museum of Art. Partly because of CCAD's renowned fashion design program, in 2012 Columbus was ranked by Bloomberg as the third most fashionable city in the United States.

=== Events ===
==== Chroma: Best of CCAD ====
The annual Chroma: Best of CCAD exhibition showcases outstanding student work from across the college's academic programs. This faculty-juried show features select work from CCAD students of all years.

==== CCAD Art Fair ====
CCAD's annual Art Fair & Marketplace showcases one-of-a-kind work ranging from traditional fine arts pieces to modern goods and decor. All items are made by CCAD students and alumni, and all sales proceeds go to the artists and designers.

==== CCAD Fashion Show ====
Senior Fashion Design students show their collections on the runway at one of their biggest annual events.

=== Student organizations ===
==== Botticelli Magazine ====
Botticelli Magazine is a literary and art journal produced and edited by students at Columbus College of Art and Design. It features fiction, poetry, creative nonfiction, reviews, art, and photography, as well as flash pieces and links to online work as long as the rights are available to the contributor. The magazine's review process involves an editorial staff of writers and artists consisting of students and faculty.

== Alumni ==
=== Notable alumni ===
- Alan Becker, online animator, YouTuber and creator known for Animator vs. Animation
- Michael Carney, art director, graphic artist, Grammy winner for Best Record Package
- Matt Cavotta, writer, fantasy artist, and illustrator
- Roy Doty, cartoonist known for his syndicated "Wordless Workshop" comic strip, and for illustrating Judy Blume's books Tales of a Fourth Grade Nothing, Otherwise Known as Sheila the Great, and Superfudge. Winner of the National Cartoonist Society's Reuben Illustrator of the Year Award for 2006, and inductee to the National Cartoonists Society Hall of Fame.
- Edward Mason Eggleston (1882–1941), painter and commercial illustrator in New York City
- Nicky Epstein, knitting designer and author
- Inka Essenhigh, painter who has exhibited at MoMA PS1, the Berlin Biennale, and Museum of Modern Art, New York
- Ming Fay, sculptor
- Brian Fee, filmmaker, director of Cars 3
- Keron Grant (born 1976), comic book artist for properties including Iron Man, Spider-Man, Superman, and Fantastic Four, and concept designer for films Man of Steel, G.I. Joe: Retaliation, The Lone Ranger, Robocop, and Chronicle.
- Nathan Greno (born 1975), director of Tangled and the cancelled Gigantic, and a story artist for Frozen, Bolt, Meet the Robinsons, Chicken Little, and Brother Bear at Walt Disney Pictures
- Alex Grey, visionary artist, author, and teacher
- Kerry G. Johnson, cartoonist, graphic designer, art director, caricaturist and children's book illustrator.
- Lucius Kutchin (1901–1936), modernist painter (Columbus Art School)
- Robert McCall (1919–2010), conceptual illustrator for NASA and films 2001: A Space Odyssey, The Black Hole, Tora! Tora! Tora!, and Star Trek: The Motion Picture
- Jerry McDaniel, heterogeneous artist, graphic designer, illustrator, fine artist, abstract painter, film maker, and art educator
- Ron Miller (born 1947), illustrator and author, specializing in science, astronomy and science fiction
- Dean Mitchell, painter
- John Jude Palencar, fantasy, science fiction, and horror artist
- Aminah Robinson, multimedia artist and MacArthur Fellow
- Herb Roe, painter
- Mahler B. Ryder (1937–1992) mixed-media artist, sculptor, educator
- Annetta Johnson Saint-Gaudens (1869–1943), sculptor
- Dan Scanlon (born 1976), screenwriter and director of Monsters University and Onward. Scanlon was also a story artist on Cars, and Toy Story 3, vice president of creativity at Pixar.
- Alice Schille (1869–1955), painter, watercolorist
- Fawn Veerasunthorn, film director and animator
- Choi Yan-chi, Hong Kong based artist
