= Fudge (disambiguation) =

Fudge is a type of confectionery, usually made with sugar, milk, butter and flavoring, and often chocolate.

Fudge may also refer to:

== People ==
Fudge as a surname may refer to:

- Alan Fudge (1944–2011), American actor
- Ann M. Fudge (born 1951) former CEO of Young & Rubicam, serves on a number of corporate boards
- Edward Fudge (1944–2017), American theologian
- Georgia Fudge, American female bodybuilder
- Jamaal Fudge (born 1983), American footballer
- Marcia Fudge (born 1952), American politician
- Paula Fudge (born 1952), English long-distance runner

=== Fictional characters ===
- Farley Drexel "Fudge" Hatcher, character in the Fudge series of books by Judy Blume
- Cornelius Fudge, Minister for Magic in the Harry Potter books by J. K. Rowling
- Fatty Fudge, cartoon character in The Beano comic

== Entertainment ==
- Fudge, a book series by Judy Blume
  - Fudge (TV series), an American television series based on the book series
- Fudge (role-playing game system)
- The Fudge, a Dutch rock band
- Fudge (album), a 2026 album by Michael Kiwanuka
- Fudge 44, 2006 feature film by Graham Jones

== Other uses ==
- Fudge (chocolate bar), a brand of chocolate bar made by Cadbury
- Fudge duck, colloquial name for the ferruginous duck
- A minced oath of fuck
