= Superfudge =

1980 children's novel by Judy Blume

- First edition
- Author: Judy Blume
- Cover artist: Roy Doty
- Language: English
- Series: Fudge series
- Genre: Children's novel
- Publisher: E. P. Dutton
- Publication date: 1980
- Publication place: United States
- Media type: Print (hardback & paperback)
- Pages: 178pp.
- ISBN: 0-525-40522-4
- OCLC: 5992603
- LC Class: PZ7.B6265 Su 1980
- Preceded by: Otherwise Known as Sheila the Great
- Followed by: Fudge-A-Mania

Superfudge is a children's novel by Judy Blume, published in 1980. It is the sequel to Tales of a Fourth Grade Nothing and Otherwise Known as Sheila the Great and the third in the Fudge series.

== Plot ==
At the beginning of this book, the Hatcher family has a new baby daughter. They make a temporary move from New York City to Princeton, New Jersey. This new addition, named Tamara Roxanne, is known as "The Baby" for some time in the book.

Peter is 11 years old and is in 5th grade and later 6th grade. His 4 year old brother, Fudge (who is in preschool and later kindergarten), becomes extremely jealous of his new sister, who earns the nickname "Tootsie" from their mother Anne's cute-speak and their grandmother Muriel's favorite old song. Fudge says they do not need a sister. His mother explains that Tootsie is staying whether he likes it or not.

Peter deals with the fallout from Fudge's various problems; one of these involves his anger with his teacher who refuses to address him using his nickname. In the course of his temper tantrum, he kicks her in the shin in front of the class. Fudge is moved to another kindergarten class where the teacher calls him Fudge.

In another incident, Fudge attempts to get rid of Tootsie. As he has previously, he continues to try to insinuate himself into Peter's activities, especially with Peter's new friend, Alex Santo. In the end, the Hatchers decide to move back to New York City, a decision brought on by Tootsie's first word, "yuck", which she learns while undergoing a diaper change by Peter.

Peter insists that they do not need a baby. However, his father makes it clear they have no choice, noting, whether they need it or not, he's are getting a baby brother or sister. And he lets him know he "might as well be used to the idea". Part of the book deals with Fudge's understanding that he has now become the middle child, rather than the baby of the family.

== Awards ==
- Won – Books I Love Best Yearly: Early Readers Award (1990)-1991

== Television ==
A Saturday morning television series based on Superfudge titled Fudge ran for portions of two seasons on ABC in 1995. "Fudge Meets Ratface" was one of the episodes based on Chapter 6 of Superfudge, which was called "Farley Drexel Meets Ratface". Another episode, called "Uncle Feather", was based on Chapter 7: A Very Cultured Bird.

== Feature film ==
In 2022, an animated feature film based on the book was put into production for Disney+, produced by Disney Television Animation and the Russo brothers's AGBO, with Amos Vernon and Nunzio Randazzo writing.
