= Fudge-a-Mania =

1990 children's novel by Judy Blume

Fudge-A-Mania (book 3)
- First edition
- Author: Judy Blume
- Language: English
- Series: Fudge series
- Genre: Children's novel
- Publisher: Dutton Children's Books
- Publication date: 1990
- Publication place: United States
- Media type: Print (paperback)
- Pages: 160 pp
- ISBN: 0-525-44672-9
- OCLC: 22115812
- LC Class: PZ7.B6265 Fu 1990
- Preceded by: Superfudge
- Followed by: Double Fudge

Fudge-a-Mania is a 1990 children's novel by Judy Blume and the fourth entry in the Fudge series.

== Plot ==
Peter Hatcher is horrified to learn of his family's plans to spend summer in a vacation home alongside the Tubmans, the family of his archrival, Sheila, located in Southwest Harbor, Maine. On the other hand, his younger brother, Fudge, who is five years old, anticipates the vacation because of his plans to marry Sheila as a means of protection against the supposed "monsters" hiding beneath his bed, knowing that spouses often share one.

This wish is dropped after a newfound friend named Mitzi Apfel provides Fudge with a bottle of her grandmother's "monster spray" during the vacation, but Peter is stunned to learn that she is the granddaughter of an idolized baseball player known as "Big Apfel".

Peter is allowed to invite his best friend, Jimmy Fargo, on the vacation with him, a privilege intended to compensate for having to spend it alongside Sheila; however, he becomes irritated when Jimmy starts to spend more time with her than with him out of sympathy for her own good friend's (Mouse Ellis, who was introduced in Otherwise Known as Sheila the Great) inability to join her on the vacation too, as she has the chicken pox.

Along the way, Peter develops a huge infatuation on a teenage librarian named Isobel (Izzy for short) and Fudge is inspired to write a picture book after learning about Mitzi's own, "Tell Me a Mitzi".

Jimmy's father, Frank, a celebrated painter, also receives inspiration after the Hatchers' baby daughter, Tootsie, toddles across a canvas with blue paint smeared on her feet, commencing a series of paintings appropriately entitled "Baby Feet".

Peter, Fudge, and Tootsie's widowed grandmother, Muriel, later marries Sheila's widowed grandfather, Buzzy Senior, much to Peter and Sheila's dismay, who thereafter pledged they would never stand each other, despite now being stepcousins.

== Reception ==
In its review of the book, Kirkus Reviews wrote that "the story's a bit tame (no controversies here), but often amusingly true to life and with enough comic episodes to satisfy fans". Publishers Weekly called it a "fast-pitched, funny novel" and praised its "numerous diverting scenes".

== Television adaptation ==
A television film based on the book premiered on ABC on January 7, 1995, in the United States, starring Jake Richardson, Florence Henderson, Eve Plumb, Shirley Knight, Alex Karras, Luke Tarsitano, and Darren McGavin. It was directed by Bob Clark. It also inspired a half-hour Saturday morning TV series, Fudge, which premiered on ABC the following Saturday morning and ran for two seasons.
