= Tales of a Fourth Grade Nothing =

1972 American children's book by Judy Blume

- First edition
- Author: Judy Blume
- Illustrator: Roy Doty
- Language: English
- Series: Fudge series
- Genre: Children's novel
- Publisher: Dutton
- Publication date: 1972
- Publication place: United States
- Media type: Print (hardback & paperback)
- Pages: 120 pp
- ISBN: 0-525-40720-0
- OCLC: 340266
- LC Class: PZ7.B6265 Tal
- Followed by: Otherwise Known as Sheila the Great

Tales of a Fourth Grade Nothing is a children's novel written by American author Judy Blume and published in 1972. It is the first in the Fudge series and was followed by Otherwise Known as Sheila the Great, Superfudge, Fudge-a-Mania, and Double Fudge (2002).

The book originally featured illustrations by Roy Doty, though reprints after 2002 have omitted the artwork.

The story focuses on nine-year-old Peter Warren Hatcher and his relationship with his two-and-a-half-year-old (three years old in Chapter 5) brother, Farley Drexel "Fudge" Hatcher.

== Plot ==
Peter is frustrated with the horrendous behavior demonstrated by Fudge, who frequently goes unpunished. Peter becomes annoyed with Fudge because he often disturbs his pet turtle, Dribble, which he won at his best friend Jimmy Fargo's birthday party. Furthermore, Fudge throws non-stop temper tantrums, goes through a finicky phase of abstaining from eating altogether, emulates Peter's behavior, and throws tantrums if it is prohibited. Nevertheless, their parents, Warren and Anne, dote on him, to Peter's anger and frustration.

For months, Fudge's antics continue; when Warren invites his client, the president of the Juicy-O company, Howard Yarby, and his wife to stay at their apartment during their holiday in New York City, Fudge ends their stay early by frightening Mrs. Yarby and decorating their suitcase with trading stamps. Afterward, he goes through a period of refusing to eat, which ends after Warren pours a bowl of cereal over his head, coining the phrase "Eat it or wear it." At Central Park, he knocks his front teeth out after catapulting himself off the jungle gym in the playground when he attempts to fly. On his third birthday, Anne throws him a birthday party, which proves to be disastrous when he and his friends misbehave. When Anne takes Peter and Fudge out for the day, Fudge misbehaves at the dentist's office, shoe store, and hamburger restaurant. When Peter is assigned a school project on transportation, Fudge vandalizes his visual aids, and receives a rare spanking from Anne as punishment. While Anne is in Boston visiting her sister, Linda, Warren is forced to include Fudge in his ad agency's commercial by his new client, the president of the Toddle-Bike company. While taking Peter and Fudge to a movie theater, Fudge takes off when he believes the onscreen bears are real.

As summer approaches, Fudge takes Dribble from his bowl and swallows him, much to his family's horror. He is rushed to the hospital, where Dribble is expelled, to Anne's relief. However, he has died in Fudge's stomach and Peter is devastated over the loss of him; Warren and Anne sympathetically compensate by giving Peter a puppy, which he appropriately names Turtle in memory of Dribble.

== Chapters ==
Chapter 1: The Big Winner

- Peter wins his pet turtle, Dribble, at his best friend Jimmy Fargo's birthday party, and shows him to everyone including Fudge, whom he warns not to touch him, and Fudge laughs like crazy.

Chapter 2: Mr. and Mrs. Juicy O

- Mr. and Mrs. Yarby stay with the Hatchers, and Fudge misbehaves, costing Warren an account in the process.

Chapter 3: The Family Dog

- Fudge stops eating, and everyone tries to come up with ideas to get his appetite back. After some unorthodox methods, Warren finally lays down the law.

Chapter 4: My Brother the Bird

- When Peter, Jimmy, and Sheila go to the playground in Central Park to look after Fudge, he jumps off the jungle gym and knocks out his two front teeth. Anne initially blames Peter for the mishap, but later apologizes, claiming no one is to blame.

Chapter 5: The Birthday Bash

- Fudge has his third birthday party, with some equally troublesome friends, including a boy who eats himself sick, a girl who bites people and wets her pants, and another boy who cries all the time.

Chapter 6: Fang Hits Town

- Fudge misbehaves when he, Peter, and Anne spend Saturday together. He refuses to buy a pair of shoes until Peter wears them, and wreaks havoc at a hamburger restaurant.

Chapter 7: The Flying Train Committee

- Peter, Jimmy, and Sheila work on a school project based on transportation together. Fudge vandalizes their poster, prompting Anne to finally enforce some discipline.

Chapter 8: The T.V. Star

- Fudge is chosen to ride the Toddle Bike in a commercial, but proves to be high maintenance on the set.

Chapter 9: Just Another Rainy Day

- Peter, Fudge, and Warren head to the movie theater, where Fudge goes missing. Warren later prepares a meal that proves inedible, which Fudge uses against him.

Chapter 10: Dribble!

- Fudge swallows Dribble, and is hospitalized. Fudge recovers, but Dribble is killed, much to Peter's dismay. In the end, he is given ownership of a puppy (which Warren promises will grow too big for Fudge to swallow), and names him Turtle in memory of Dribble.

== Cultural impact ==
Tales of a Fourth Grade Nothing has been used in United States classrooms to teach students about humor.

Tales of a Fourth Grade Nothing was criticized by sociologists for supporting prevailing social systems.
