= Fudge Hatcher =

Farley Drexel "Fudge" Hatcher
- Fudge series character
- First appearance: Tales of a Fourth Grade Nothing
- Last appearance: Double Fudge
- Created by: Judy Blume
- Portrayed by: Luke Tarsitano (TV series)

In-universe information
- Alias: Farley Drexel Hatcher (full name); Fudgie (by his parents and Sheila); Fang (by Peter in Tales of a Fourth Grade Nothing); Egduf Muriel
- Species: Human
- Gender: Male
- Family: Anne Hatcher (mother); Warren Hatcher (father); Peter Warren "Pete" Hatcher (brother); Tamara Roxanne "Tootsie" Hatcher (sister)
- Relatives: Flora, Fauna, and Farley Drexel "Mini-Fudge" Hatcher (second cousins); Muriel Tubman (maternal grandmother); Howie Hatcher (cousin once removed); Eudora Hatcher (cousin once removed); Mrs. Hatcher (paternal grandmother, deceased); Bertram "Buzzy Senior" Tubman (step-grandfather); Bertram "Buzz" Tubman, Jr. (step-uncle); Jean Tubman (step-aunt); Libby Tubman (step-cousin); Sheila Tubman (step-cousin); Linda (maternal aunt); Linda's daughter (maternal cousin)
- Nationality: American

Farley Drexel Hatcher, usually referred to by his nickname "Fudge", is a fictional character in several novels by Judy Blume. In the television series Fudge, he was played by Luke Tarsitano.

== Character ==
=== Life ===
Farley Drexel Hatcher was born in New York, and is the younger of two sons of Warren and Anne Hatcher. Nicknamed Fudge early in his life, Fudge is 3 as of Chapter Five in Tales of a Fourth Grade Nothing. He also has a younger sister named Tootsie.

== Ideas, interests and obsessions ==
- Tales of a Fourth Grade Nothing - wanting to fly, mimicking a dog, believing that the bears shown in a documentary film he, Peter and Warren watch at the theater are real.
- Superfudge - being a bird, Uncle Feather (his pet Myna Bird), pretending to believe in Santa Claus, being a superhero.
- Fudge-a-Mania - marrying Sheila Tubman, birds, dinosaurs, spinning in circles repeatedly, being a baseball team captain, being a bird breeder.
- Double Fudge - money, various ways to spend money, expensive toys and play structures.

== See also ==
- List of Fudge series characters
- Tales of a Fourth Grade Nothing
- Superfudge
- Fudge-a-Mania
- Double Fudge
