= Slam Book =

A slam book is a notebook that is passed among children and teenagers.

Slam Book may also refer to:

- Slam Book (film), a 2015 Marathi language drama film
- Slam Book (novel), a novel by Ann M. Martin
