= Nebo (Struthers, Ohio) =

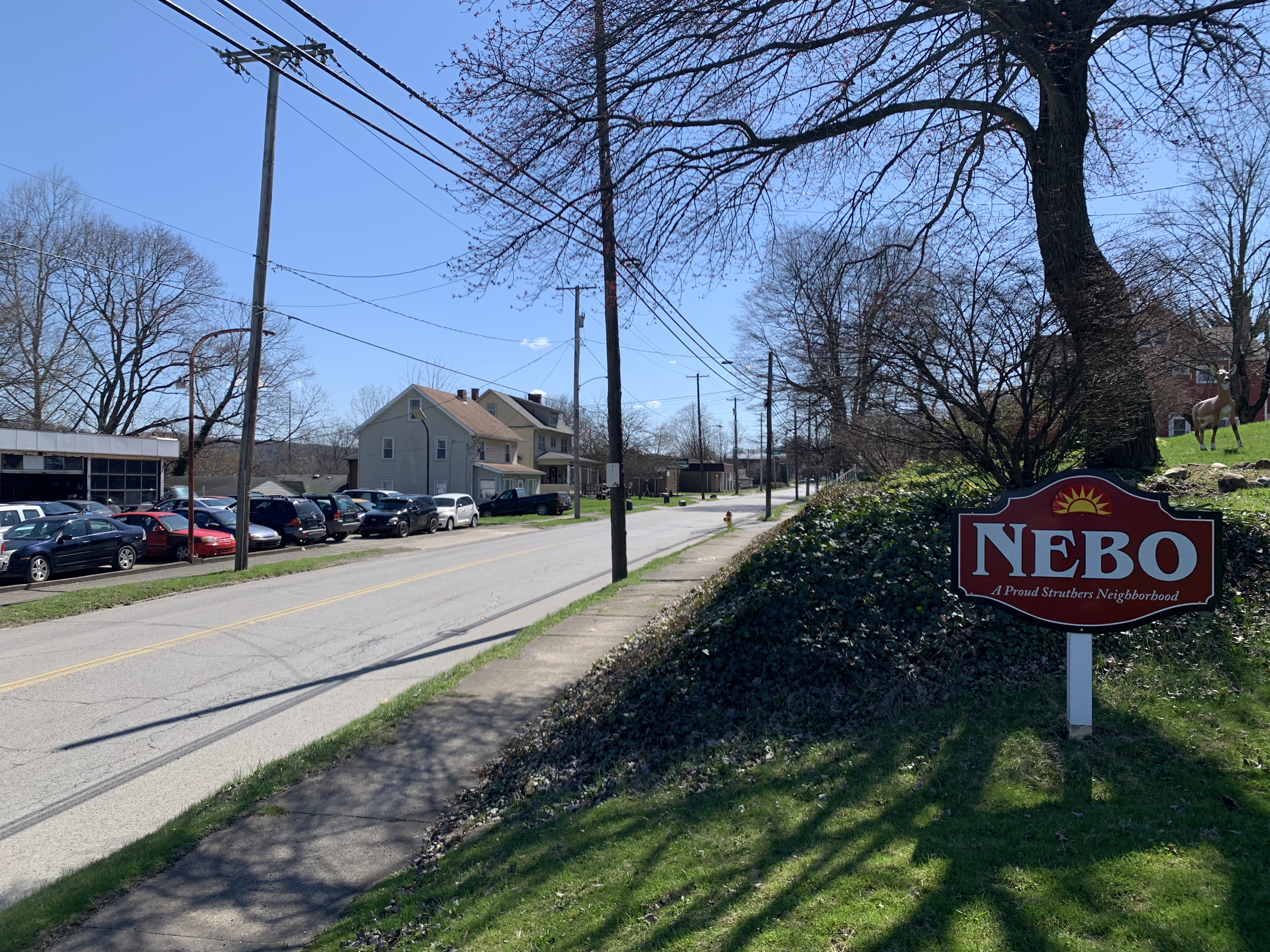
- Lowellville Road, with the opposite slope of the Mahoning Valley in the background
- Interactive map of Nebo
- Coordinates: 41.048116°N 80.583734°W
- Country: United States
- State: Ohio
- County: Mahoning
- City: Struthers

Nebo /ˈniːboʊ/ is a neighborhood in Struthers, Ohio. It is located on the east end of the city, south of the Mahoning River. The district historically contained a significant Slavic American population.

== Etymology ==
The name Nebo can be traced back to 1828, with a coal mine on the future site of the neighborhood bearing the name Mount Nebo, a reference to the biblical feature. However, a popular folk etymology exists which ties it to the Slavic nebo, meaning heaven or sky. In any case, the name was appropriated by the immigrant population and is now largely associated with the later source. The contemporary pronunciation reflects that of the original etymon and not that of nebo in any Slavic language.

== Geography ==
Nebo lies on the right bank of the Mahoning River. The community exists at a point along with river where the surrounding land experiences a substantial grade, so the south end sits at a significantly higher elevation than the north end.

=== Boundaries ===
The neighborhood is roughly delineated by Yellow Creek to the west, Panther Creek (also known as Hines Run) to the east, and the Norfolk Southern Railway Youngstown line to the north. Its location between the two creeks' respective gorges, and resulting limited connection with the rest of the city, has been suggested as a reason for its relatively strong self-identity. A sign at the intersection of Clingan and Struthers Road and Center Street indicating the southern limit of the district corroborates the local sentiment that Struthers plats off of the more recently-developed Clingan Road are not included in the bounds of the neighborhood, notwithstanding their placement between Yellow Creek and Hines Run.

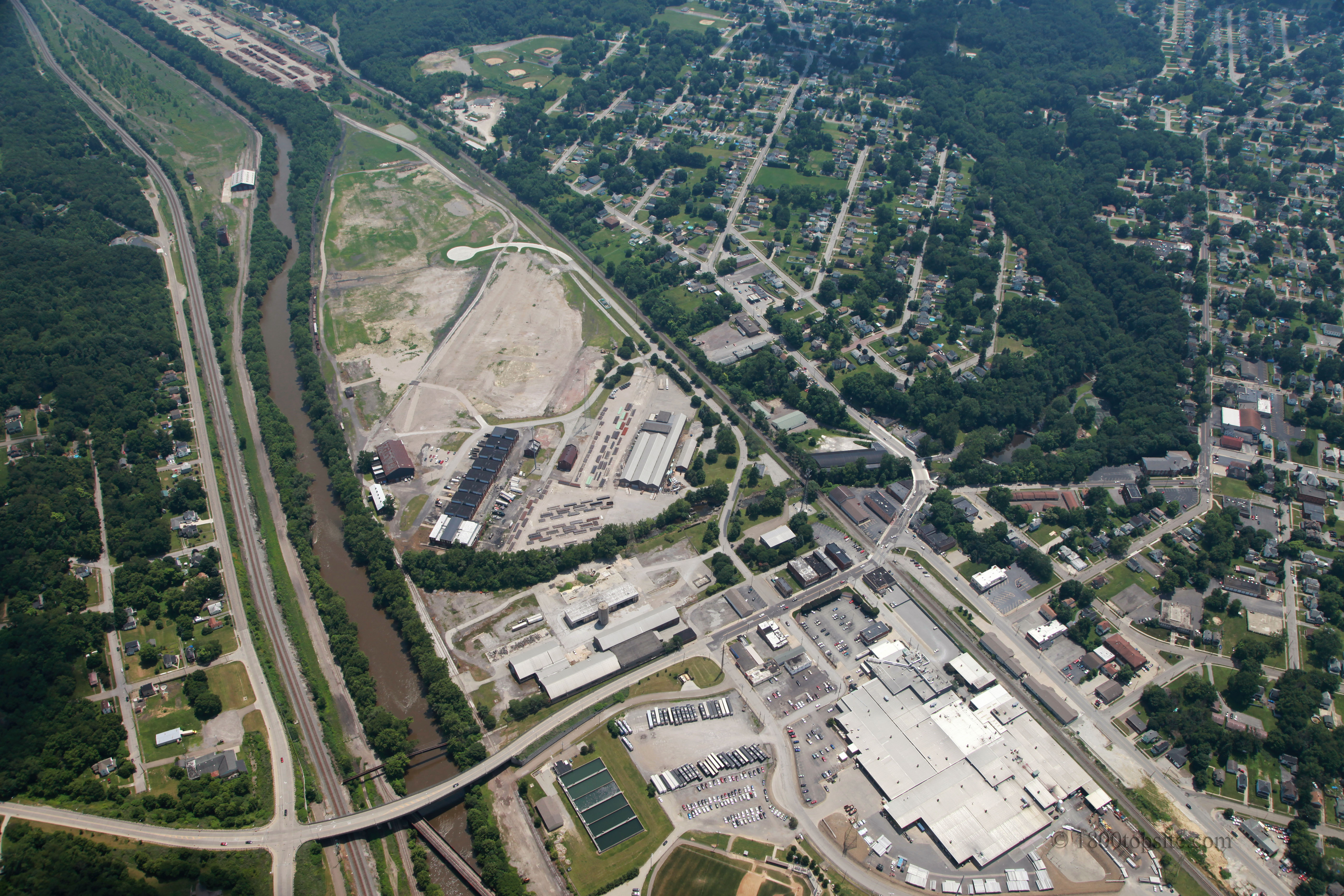
Nebo's position between the two wooded gorges can be seen at top-center

=== Political ===
Nebo is located entirely within the 3rd Struthers City Council ward, which is currently represented by Robert D. Burnside.

== History ==
European activity in the area began with the establishment of the Mount Nebo coal mine circa 1828 by Elijah Stevenson. Permanent residential settlement dates back to at least 1874, where the presence of a "Neba Station" was recorded along the rail line, near the mouth of Panther Creek. The community grew large enough to warrant an elementary school by 1917, which was built on Center Street and expanded through the 1950s. After further growth in the northern half of the neighborhood during the early twentieth century, the village of Struthers annexed the southern half in 1932. Attracting many immigrant industrial workers during this time, a number of ethnic clubs were founded in Nebo. The size of the community began to decline after Black Monday, along with the rest of Struthers and the Steel Valley, and the elementary school was demolished in 2003 with the centralization of the city's primary schools. Presently, the population is stable, but has heterogenized since its twentieth century immigration surge.
