= Peter Hatcher =

Peter Warren Hatcher
- Fudge series character
- First appearance: Tales of a Fourth Grade Nothing
- Last appearance: Double Fudge
- Created by: Judy Blume
- Portrayed by: Jake Richardson

In-universe information
- Nickname: Pee-tah (by Fudge in earlier books); Pete (by Fudge in later books as of Fudge-A-Mania); Pee (by Tootsie in "Fudge-A-Mania"); Retep Nerraw Muriel
- Species: Human
- Gender: Male
- Family: Anne Hatcher (mother); Warren Hatcher (father); Farley Drexel "Fudge" Hatcher (brother); Tamara Roxanne "Tootsie" Hatcher (sister)
- Relatives: Flora, Fauna, and Farley Drexel "Mini-Fudge" Hatcher (second cousins); Muriel Tubman (maternal grandmother); Howie Hatcher (cousin once removed); Eudora Hatcher (cousin once removed); Mrs. Hatcher (paternal grandmother, deceased); Bertram "Buzzy Senior" Tubman (step-grandfather); Bertram "Buzz" Tubman, Jr. (step-uncle); Jean Tubman (step-aunt); Libby Tubman (step-cousin); Sheila Tubman (step-cousin); Linda (maternal aunt); Linda's daughter (maternal cousin)
- Nationality: American

Peter Warren Hatcher is a fictional character created by American author Judy Blume. He first appeared in the children's novel Tales of a Fourth Grade Nothing and in several subsequent Blume stories, most of which focus on his younger brother Fudge. In the television series Fudge, he is played by Jake Richardson.

== Character ==
=== Life ===
Peter is portrayed as being polite in mannerisms when addressing others such as adults, new acquaintances, and authority figures, albeit his inner thoughts are portrayed as being more sarcastic, a side to himself that he is willing to reveal at certain times. He is extremely exasperated with the constant naughtiness and brattiness demonstrated by his younger brother Fudge, whose continuous bouts of severe misconduct and disobedience are often the cause of extreme mortification and infuriation for Peter. Because of his parents' frequent overindulgence of Fudge and the occasional blame laid upon Peter for his brother's appalling deportment, he is often left in misery and anger over these factors. Among his close friends and acquaintances is, most notably, his neighbor Jimmy Fargo, with whom he frequently plays and hangs around with, and his enemy and cousin-in-law, Sheila Tubman, the main heroine of Judy Blume's Otherwise Known as Sheila the Great, in which Peter barely appears. He lives in New York City with his parents, Fudge, and his baby sister, Tamara Roxanne, or more commonly known as Tootsie.

=== Appearance ===
In the reprints, Peter's appearance consists of tousled brown hair. In his character description on the Double Fudge website, he appears to have dark brown hair. On the 2003 reprint cover of Superfudge, Peter appears to be wearing red high-tops. However, in the original illustrations supplied by Roy Doty, his brown hair was combed considerably neater and his appearance was virtually identical to that of Fudge (albeit taller and slimmer).

He describes his little brother as "a pain in the neck", "Little Monster", "Off the Wall", and "The Biggest Pain ever invented!".

== See also ==
- List of Fudge series characters
