= No Way Out (1950 film) =

1950 film by Joseph L. Mankiewicz

- Theatrical release poster by Paul Rand
- Directed by: Joseph L. Mankiewicz
- Written by: Lesser Samuels; Joseph L. Mankiewicz
- Produced by: Darryl F. Zanuck
- Starring: Sidney Poitier; Richard Widmark; Linda Darnell; Stephen McNally
- Cinematography: Milton R. Krasner
- Edited by: Barbara McLean
- Music by: Alfred Newman
- Production company: 20th Century-Fox
- Distributed by: 20th Century-Fox
- Release dates: August 17, 1950 (New York); October 1950 (United States)
- Running time: 107 minutes
- Country: United States
- Language: English
- Box office: $1.3 million

No Way Out is a 1950 American crime drama film noir directed by Joseph L. Mankiewicz and starring Sidney Poitier in his film debut, alongside Richard Widmark, Linda Darnell and Stephen McNally. The film centers on an African American doctor who confronts the racism of a poor slum after he treats a racist white criminal.

No Way Out was controversial in its "graphic representation of racial violence" in what director Mankiewicz termed "the absolute blood and guts of Negro hating." The film marked the feature-acting debuts of Poitier, Mildred Joanne Smith, and Ossie Davis.

Mankiewicz and Lesser Samuels were also nominated for Best Story and Screenplay at the 23rd Academy Awards, losing to Charles Brackett, Billy Wilder, and D. M. Marshman Jr. for Sunset Boulevard.

== Plot ==
Dr. Luther Brooks is the first African-American doctor at the urban county hospital where he trained. Despite assurances from his mentor, chief resident Dr. Dan Wharton, Brooks sometimes lacks confidence in his own skills. Brooks is working at the hospital's prison ward when Johnny and Ray Biddle, brothers who were both shot in the leg while attempting a robbery, are brought in for treatment. Johnny's symptoms, such as disorientation and dilated pupils, worry Luther. The bigoted Ray bombards Luther with racist slurs as he tries to treat them.

Concerned that Johnny has a brain tumor, Luther administers a spinal tap, but Johnny dies during the procedure. Ray, who believes that Johnny was only suffering from a gunshot to the leg, accuses Luther of killing him, and promises revenge. Luther consults with Wharton, who believes Luther followed the right course of treatment, but concedes the diagnosis may have been incorrect.

To determine whether his treatment was correct, Luther requests an autopsy of Johnny, but Ray refuses to consent; he does not want his brother's body "cut up". The head of the hospital also denies the autopsy request, because he fears that a scandal involving their only black doctor could endanger funding.

Luther and Wharton visit Johnny's widow, Edie Johnson, seeking her help in getting an autopsy. Edie grew up with the Biddles in the city's poor, white Beaver Canal district, where racism is prevalent; she refuses to help them, but the conflicted Edie later visits Ray in the prison ward to ask why he will not approve the autopsy. Ray tells her that Johnny would still be alive if he would have had a white doctor, and that Wharton and Luther only want the autopsy so they can cover up the truth about Johnny's death. Ray convinces Edie that the doctors are attempting to play her for a "chump", and that she should tell Beaver Canal club owner Rocky Miller about the circumstances surrounding Johnny's death. Accompanied by Ray's deaf-mute other brother George, Edie does this, and Rocky and his pals plan to attack the black section of town.

Luther, speaking with a black elevator operator, learns that the black community has heard about the pending attack and is planning to strike first. When Luther tries to dissuade him, the operator reminds him of past assaults on the black community, and asks, "Ain't it asking a lot for us to be better than them when we get killed just trying to prove we're as good?" The race riot occurs, and Luther tends to its victims until a white woman orders him to take his "black hands" off her son and spits in his face. Stunned, Luther walks out.

Despondent at what her actions have caused, Edie visits Wharton's home, where after initial racist misgivings, she befriends his black maid, Gladys. Wharton, Gladys, and Edie learn that Luther has turned himself in for the murder of Johnny Biddle. Wharton realizes that Luther has done this to force the coroner to conduct an autopsy on Biddle.

The autopsy confirms that Johnny died of a brain tumor and that Luther's course of treatment was correct. Ray only grows angrier at this, convinced of a conspiracy to bury the truth. After overhearing Wharton say that he is leaving town for vacation, Ray and George overpower the police guard and escape, with Ray reinjuring his wounded leg. Ray and George force Edie to call Luther and lure him to Wharton's empty house. Drunk and in great pain, Ray raves that he is going to kill Luther and leaves. Edie manages to escape from George and calls the police to help Luther.

At Wharton's house, Ray holds a gun on Luther while beating him and shouting slurs. Edie arrives and sees that Ray's physical pain and obsessive hatred have pushed him beyond reason. Edie turns out the lights as Ray shoots. Luther is wounded in the shoulder, but grabs Ray's gun after he collapses in pain. Luther asserts that he cannot let Ray die simply because of his racism, and convinces Edie to help him save Ray's life. As sirens wail in the distance, Luther tells the hysterical Ray, "Don't cry, white boy, you're gonna live."

== Cast ==
- Sidney Poitier as Dr. Luther Brooks
- Maude Simmons as Luther's mother (uncredited)
- Richard Widmark as Ray Biddle
- Dick Paxton as John Biddle (uncredited)
- Linda Darnell as Edie Johnson, John Biddle's widow
- Stephen McNally as Dr. Dan Wharton
- Mildred Joanne Smith as Cora Brooks
- Harry Bellaver as George Biddle
- Stanley Ridges as Dr. Sam Moreland
- Dots Johnson as "Lefty" Jones
- Ossie Davis as John Brooks (uncredited)
- Ruby Dee as Connie Brooks (uncredited)
- Bert Freed as Rocky Miller (uncredited)
- Fred Graham as Wilson (uncredited)
- Frank Overton as Intern (uncredited)
- Amanda Randolph as Gladys (uncredited)
- Frank Richards as Mac (uncredited)
- Ray Teal as Day Deputy (uncredited)
- Ian Wolfe as Watkins (uncredited)
- Will Wright as Dr. Cheney (uncredited)

== Production ==
Director Joseph Mankiewicz personally selected Sidney Poitier from a small group of finalists for the part of the young medical doctor Luther Brooks. Characterized by "emotional intensity and grace", the part launched Poitier's film career. The film also marks the first time that Ossie Davis (film debut) and Ruby Dee appeared together on screen, both uncredited.

In January 1949, Twentieth Century Fox acquired the film rights to Lesser Samuels's story and signed him to a ten-week contract to write the screenplay. Columbia, Paramount, Universal, and Warner Bros. also competed for the rights. Samuels initially aimed to write about "the cancerous results of hatred" without focusing on an African-American doctor until learning about their experiences from his daughter's fiancé, a doctor. Fox producers, including Otto Preminger, Sol Siegel, and Nunnally Johnson, were enthusiastic about the story while Fox public relations counsel Jason Joy expressed concerns about the potential for the story's violence to incite fear and unrest.

After acquiring Samuels's story, writer Philip Yordan made suggestions that were included in the final film, such as portraying "real Negroes and how they live, as human beings," with authentic family dynamics. Studio production head Darryl F. Zanuck produced the film and emphasized avoiding propaganda while creating a statement against intolerance. Zanuck, like Joy, worried about the violence in the story, fearing it could lead to the film being banned in certain cities and result in financial disaster. Despite initially approving a script where the character "Luther" was killed, Zanuck later felt the ending left a "feeling of utter futility" and changed it. By June 1949, Mankiewicz had prepared a preliminary script with a revised storyline and characterizations, which Zanuck approved in August. The studio delayed the film's release to follow a year after their own Pinky (1949) to gradually build audience receptivity.

== Reception ==
In August 1950, the National Legion of Decency condemned the film. On August 22, Chicago police captain Harry Fullmer delayed a permit for the film's exhibition in the city and suggested banning it to police commissioner John Prendergast, fearing it "might cause more racial unrest". On the same day, Executive Secretary of the NAACP Walter White sent a telegram to Chicago Mayor Martin D. Kennelly opposing the ban. Despite this, Commissioner Prendergast approved the ban, prompting the Chicago Sun-Times to publish an editorial criticizing the censors on August 28. Mankiewicz called the ban "absurd" and sarcastically praised the city's efforts to maintain its high cultural standards by avoiding violence. Mayor Kennelly formed a special committee from the Cook County Crime Prevention Bureau, which, after a screening on August 30, recommended lifting the ban. The mayor rescinded the ban after three to four minutes of the film, including scenes of black and white characters preparing for a riot, were cut.

In Maryland, Ohio, Pennsylvania, and Virginia, a censored version was shown, and in Massachusetts, it was banned from Sunday screenings. During the Chicago ban, a Fox sales department official said there had been no effort to release the film in the South. The Maryland State Board of Motion Picture Censors cut scenes of black characters preparing for self-defense before the riot and a subsequent scene showing their victory, leading the NAACP branches in Baltimore and Maryland to complain that the film's original message was lost. Walter White and local NAACP officers wrote to the board, urging the film to be restored to its uncut version or, if not, to at least delete scenes with racial slurs. However, the board refused, with chairman Sidney Traub explaining that the board and local police found the black characters' actions during the riot scenes to be "highly provocative and crime-inciting".

In October 1950, the board of directors of the National Newspaper Publishers Association passed a resolution protesting the use of racial epithets in all films, especially in No Way Out, where racial slurs are used thirty-five times. They argued that many Americans had never heard some of the terms and their use promoted undesirable expressions inappropriate for a "decent society". This resolution was sent to the Production Code Administration, which replied that the film's producers aimed to be forceful and dramatic to benefit African Americans, not to harm them.

In a contemporary review for The New York Times, critic Thomas M. Pryor wrote:

Sometimes the sting of a club will make more of an impression than appeals to the intellect. No Way Out makes no attempt to mask the ugliness and the ignorance of a manifestation of bigotry, which has long festered in our society and is peculiarly at odds with the fundamentals of our political and religious philosophies. No Way Out poses the problem and says in effect, 'What are you going to do about it?' Some people may, like this reviewer, wish that the men who made this picture had tackled the subject with less melodramatic flair. ... Although its aim is not always as good as its intentions, No Way Out is a harsh, outspoken picture with implications that will keep you thinking about it long after leaving the theatre. That makes No Way Out an important picture.

== See also ==
- List of films featuring the deaf and hard of hearing
