= Struthers City School District =

School district in Ohio, United States

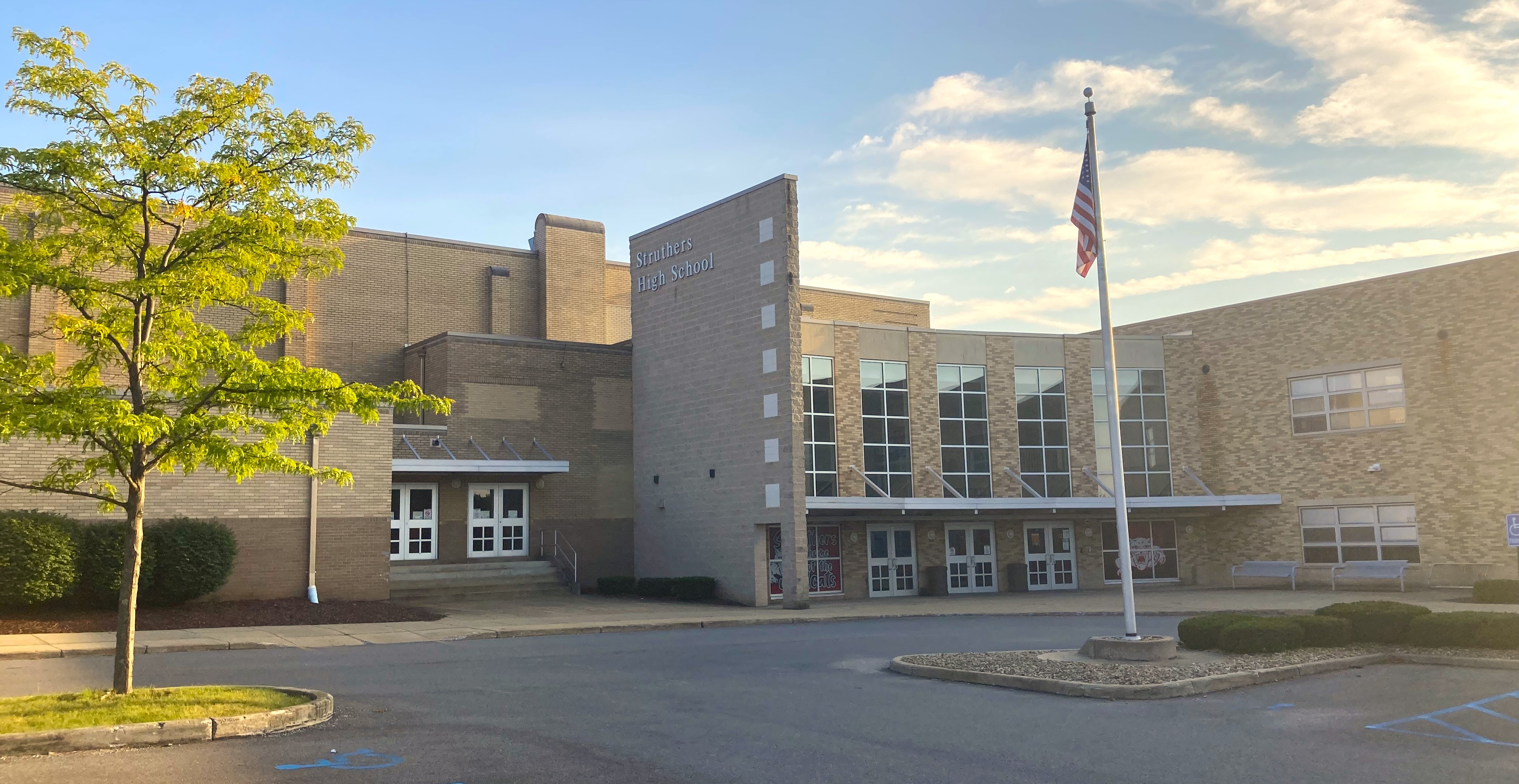
- Struthers High School entrance

Address
- 99 Euclid Ave Struthers, Ohio, 44471; United States

District information
- Type: Public
- Grades: PK-12
- Accreditation: Ohio Department of Education
- NCES District ID: 3904485

Students and staff
- Enrollment: 1,589 (2024–25)
- Staff: 111.00 (on an FTE basis)
- Student–teacher ratio: 14.32
- District mascot: Wildcats
- Colors: Red and black

Other information
- Website: strutherscityschools.org

The Struthers City School District is a school district located in southern Mahoning County, Ohio. The school district serves students in grades PreK through twelve in Struthers, Ohio. The district consists of one high school, one middle school and one elementary school. All buildings and offices are located in Struthers.

== History ==
The Struthers City School District was formed in the early 1900s. With the population growth, due to iron and steel productions, there was a growing need for a school district within the new town.

Struthers High School was built on Euclid Ave in 1921, with several primary school buildings also added to the district. In 1965, Struthers launched WKTL-FM, one of the very first student-run radio stations in the United States.

Following the collapse of the steel industry in the Mahoning Valley in the early 70s, Struthers schools began to close down several long-standing elementary schools. A new centralized elementary school was built in 2002. The school district is currently consolidated into one high school, middle school and elementary school.

== Schools ==
=== High school ===
- Struthers High School

=== Middle school ===
- Struthers Middle School

=== Elementary school ===
- Struthers Elementary School

=== Former schools ===
- Center Street School
- Elm Street School
- Lyon Plat School
- Manor Avenue School
- Northside School
- Southside School
