= Beggar's Holiday =

1946 musical

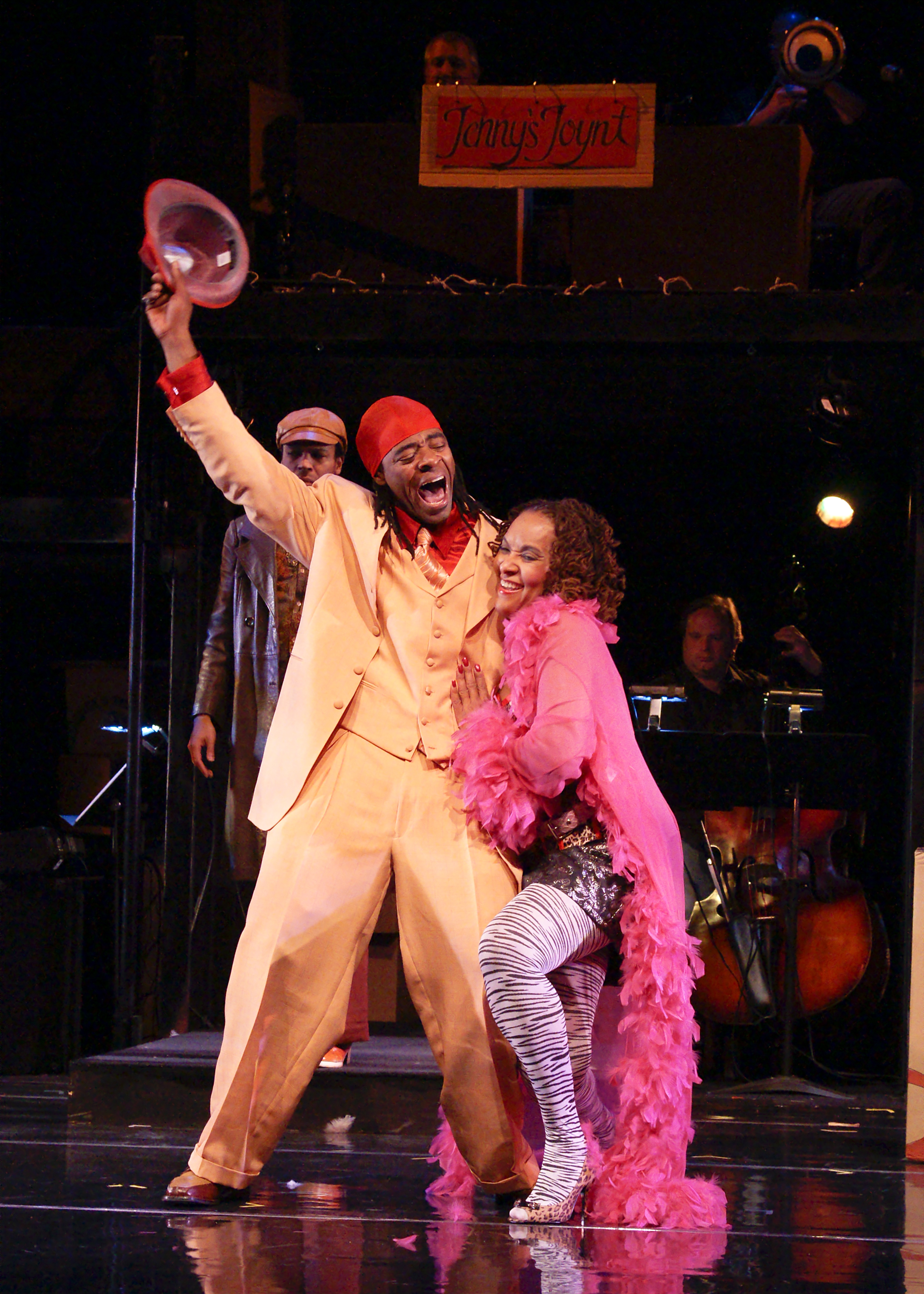
- Beggar's Holiday presented by Opera Theater of Pittsburgh
- Music: Duke Ellington
- Lyrics: John La Touche
- Book: John La Touche
- Basis: The Beggar's Opera by John Gay
- Productions: 1946 Broadway; 2004 Mill Valley, California; 2012 Paris, France

Beggar's Holiday is a musical with a book and lyrics by John La Touche and music by Duke Ellington.

== History and background ==
The project originated with black scenic designer Perry Watkins, who envisioned a jazz-driven adaptation of John Gay's The Beggar's Opera. Watkins hired John Latouche, who'd written lyrics for the cantata "Ballad for Americans" and "Cabin in the Sky," and teamed him with Ellington, still best known at the time as a band leader.

Ellington and Latouche updated the play's locale to a modern American city and turned Macheath into what Bowers calls "a pin-stripe-suited mobster, a singing, dancing Bugsy Siegel." The book itself mixed jazz and blues rhythms with more traditional musical theater, including comedy numbers written for Zero Mostel, making his Broadway debut as Peachum.

The Broadway production, directed by Nicholas Ray and choreographed by Valerie Bettis, opened on December 26, 1946 at The Broadway Theatre, where it ran for 111 performances. The cast included Alfred Drake, Zero Mostel, Bernice Parks, Jet MacDonald, Dorothy Johnson, Mildred Joanne Smith, Marie Bryant, Avon Long, William Dillard, Rollin Smith, Thomas Gomez, and Herbert Ross. The show included an interracial relationship resulting in nightly picketing outside the theater.

No Broadway cast album was recorded, but a demo tape was discovered and released, together with the score from the West End musical Bet Your Life featuring Julie Wilson and Sally Ann Howes, on an LP on the Blue Pear label. Lena Horne's recording of "Tomorrow Mountain," the show's first-act closer, was a hit.

== Plot summary ==
The musical is set in a corrupt world inhabited by rakish mobsters and their double crossing gangs, raffish madams and their dissolute whores, panhandlers and street people as they conduct their dirty business, ply their trade, and struggle to survive in brothels, shanty towns, and prisons. The plot focuses on the exploits of MacHeath, a suave New York mobster, his three women, and their various trials and tribulations with the law.

== Characters ==
- MacHeath, a ruthless mobster
- Jenny, MacHeath's lover
- Polly Peachum, MacHeath's wife
- Hamilton Peachum, Polly's father
- Mrs. Peachum, Polly's mother
- Lucy Lockit, daughter of the Chief of Police
- Careless Love
- The Cocoa Girl
- Chief of Police Lockit
- The Horn

== Musical numbers ==
=== Original 1946 production ===
Act I

- "In Between" — Lucy Lockit
- "When You Go Down By Miss Jenny's" — Citizens and Girls
- "I've Got Me" — MacHeath
- "Take Love Easy" — Jenny
- "I Wanna Be Bad" — Careless Love
- "Rooster Man" — Jenny
- "When I Walk With You" — Polly Peachum and MacHeath
- "I've Got Me" (Reprise) — First Girl
- "The Scrimmage of Life" — Mrs. Peachum, Hamilton Peachum and Lucy Lockit
- "Ore From a Gold Mine" — Mrs. Peachum and Hamilton Peachum
- "When I Walk With You" (Reprise) — MacHeath and Polly Peachum
- "Tooth and Claw" — Mac's Gange
- "Maybe I Should Change My Ways" — MacHeath
- "The Wrong Side of the Railroad Tracks" — The Cocoa Girl, Careless Love and The Horn
- "Tomorrow Mountain" — MacHeath

Act II

- "Brown Penny" § — Lucy Lockit
- "Tooth and Claw" (Reprise) — Hamilton Peachum and Reporters
- "Lullaby for Junior" — Jenny
- "Quarrel for Three" — Polly Peachum, Lucy Lockit and MacHeath
- "Fol-de-rol-rol" — MacHeath
- "Women, Women, Women" (Reprise) — The Cocoa Girl and Careless Love
- "When I Walk With You" (Reprise) — MacHeath
- "The Hunted" — MacHeath

Notes

- §: Lyrics based on poem by William Butler Yeats

== Productions ==
=== Original 1946 production ===
Beggar's Holiday premiered on Broadway at the Broadway Theatre on December 26, 1946 and closed on March 29, 1947 after 111 performances. Directed by Nicholas Ray, the show starred Alfred Drake as MacHeath, Bernice Parks as Jenny, Jet MacDonald as Polly Peachum, Zero Mostel as Hamilton Peachum, Dorothy Johnson as Mrs. Peachum, Mildred Joanne Smith as Lucy Lockit, Avon Long as Careless Love, Marie Bryant as the Cocoa Girl, Rollin Smith as Chief of Police Lockit, and William Dillard as the Horn.

The show featured orchestrations by Billy Strayhorn, choreography by Valerie Bettis, production design by Oliver Smith, lighting design by Peggy Clark, and costume design by Walter Florell.

=== 2004 Marin Theatre Company Production ===
In 2004, Dale Wasserman, one of the musical's producers and the author of Man of La Mancha, teamed with the Marin Theatre Company in Mill Valley, California to create a revamped, updated, and radically rewritten version that toned down much of the original's social criticism and political humor. The substantially rearranged jazz score included hints of funk, blues and rock and roll. Overall, its mood was far lighter and more optimistic than that of the 1946 version. Although Wasserman had hopes of a Broadway staging, to date his plans have not materialized.

=== 2012 Cast Recording ===
In 2012, French baritone David Serero performed and produced a full revival production of Beggar's Holiday by Ellington and Wasserman in November 2012 in Paris with an international cast including Emmy Award winner John Altman, Charlie Glad, Gilles San Juan and directed by James Marvel.

David Serero has also performed, arranged and produced the only cast album recording of Beggar's Holiday.
