= National Airlines Flight 101 =

1952 aviation accident

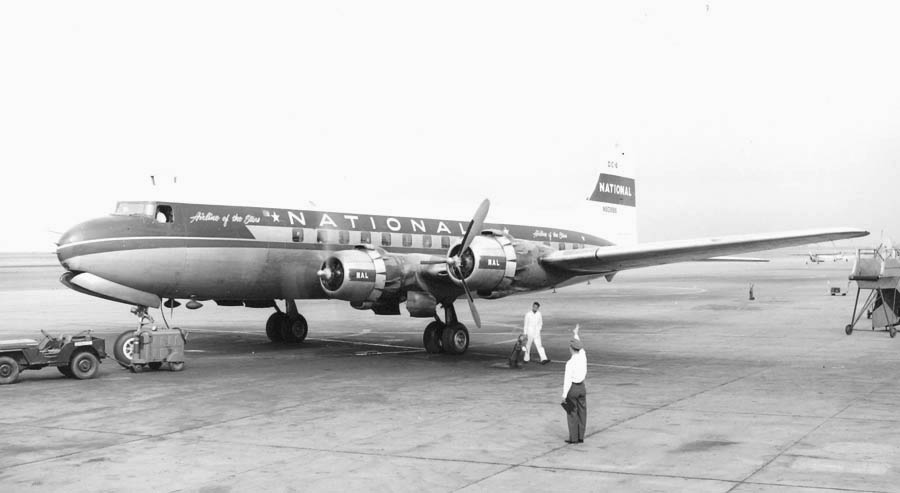
- A National Airlines DC-6 similar to the accident aircraft

Accident
- Date: February 11, 1952
- Summary: Crashed shortly after take-off due to propeller failure; pilot error
- Site: Elizabeth, New Jersey, United States; 40.679369°N 74.218083°W
- Total fatalities: 33

Aircraft
- Aircraft type: Douglas DC-6
- Operator: National Airlines
- Registration: N90891
- Flight origin: Newark Airport, New Jersey
- Destination: Miami, Florida
- Occupants: 63
- Passengers: 59
- Crew: 4
- Fatalities: 29
- Injuries: 34
- Survivors: 34

Ground casualties
- Ground fatalities: 4

National Airlines Flight 101 was a scheduled flight from Newark Airport, New Jersey, to Miami, Florida, that on February 11, 1952 crashed in the town of Elizabeth, New Jersey, shortly after take-off. It was the third plane crash occurring in Elizabeth in less than two months, following the loss of a Miami Airlines C-46 in December and the crash of an American Airlines Convair 240, three weeks earlier.

== Crash ==
The aircraft, a four-engined, propeller-driven Douglas DC-6, had departed from Newark Airport's runway 24 at 00:18 EST and was observed by personnel in the control tower suddenly losing altitude, while veering to the right. Two minutes later, the plane clipped an apartment building in Elizabeth, setting it on fire; it then crashed to the ground and burst into flames, narrowly missing an orphanage.

Of the 63 people on board (59 passengers and 4 crew members), 29 perished, while all of the survivors were injured, many seriously. Four residents in the apartment building were also killed. Among the passengers was actress Mildred Joanne Smith, who suffered severe injuries, including a broken back.

== Investigation ==
The official investigation by the Civil Aeronautics Board concluded that a failure in the propeller's pitch control system of engine No. 3 caused the propeller to go into reverse during climb-out. The engine was left running at high power, while engine No. 4 was mistakenly feathered. Under such conditions, the aircraft was no longer able to maintain altitude and descended into the ground.

== Aftermath ==
In the wake of this third accident in Elizabeth, mounting public concern led to a lengthy closure of Newark Airport and to a nationwide review of the safety of airport operations. The airport reopened only nine months later, on November 15, 1952, after the investigations into the crashes determined that the airport facilities were not at fault.

The three crashes later provided the inspiration to writer and Elizabeth resident Judy Blume for her 2015 novel In the Unlikely Event.
