= Mildred Joanne Smith =

American actress

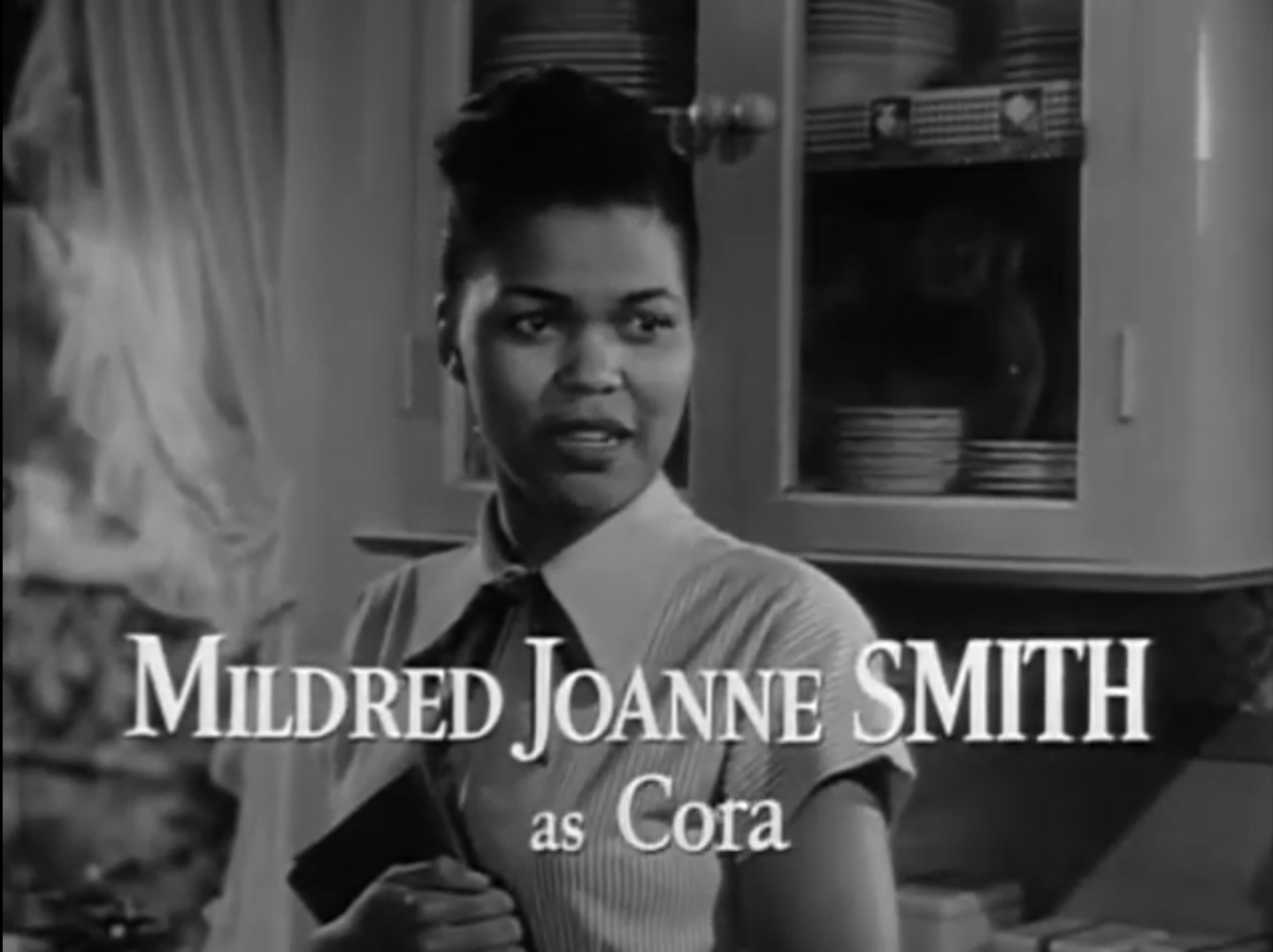
- Trailer for No Way Out (1950)
- Born: May 16, 1921; Struthers, Ohio, U.S.
- Died: July 19, 2015 (aged 94); White Plains, New York, U.S.
- Resting place: Kensico Cemetery, Valhalla, New York, U.S.
- Occupations: Actress, singer, editor, teacher
- Years active: 1940–1967
- Notable work: No Way Out (1950)
- Spouse: David A. Hepburn (m. 1955; died 1985)
- Children: 2

Mildred Joanne Smith (May 16, 1921 – July 19, 2015) was an American actress, singer, magazine editor and teacher. In her brief acting career, she performed in a number of Broadway shows and in only one film, No Way Out, alongside Sidney Poitier.

== Early life and career ==
Raised in Struthers, Ohio, Smith performed in fourteen Broadway theatre productions during the 1940s, including Men to the Sea, Mamba's Daughters, Forward the Heart, and A Long Way From Home. She also played Alfred Drake's love interest in the Broadway production of Beggar's Holiday. All of Smith's 1940s Broadway shows were short-lived, but her performances received excellent reviews.

Smith portrayed Rose in the Broadway play Set My People Free (1948). A review in the trade publication Billboard said, "Mildred Joanne Smith is excellent" in her role.

In 1950, Smith made her feature film début in the drama No Way Out, portraying Cora Brooks, the wife of Sidney Poitier's character, Dr. Luther Brooks. Despite receiving again positive reviews for her performance, she was not offered any further film roles.

Smith had just decided to turn her career to singing, with promising results, when she was involved in the crash of National Airlines Flight 101 in New Jersey in 1952, in which 29 other people on board were killed. She suffered severe injuries, including a broken back, broken ribs, and burns to her legs. In an article published shortly after, Jet magazine described Smith as "The Magnificent Failure: She won fame but never quite could attain stardom."

After recovering from the accident, Smith continued on her singing career, performing alongside artists like Duke Ellington and Billy Strayhorn in the London production of "Cockles and Champagne."

== Personal life ==
Smith was married to David A. Hepburn, a former vice president of WNEW-TV, who died in 1985. She had two children, Vanessa and David; her stepdaughter, Vera; and six grandchildren.

== Later life ==
Smith later became the women's editor of Our World, a now defunct lifestyle magazine focusing on African-American readers, and, in the early 1960s, an English teacher at Eastview Junior High School in White Plains, New York.

She died on July 19, 2015, aged 94, and is interred at the Kensico Cemetery in Valhalla, New York.
