= Struthers High School =

Coordinates: 41°03′08″N 80°35′57″W

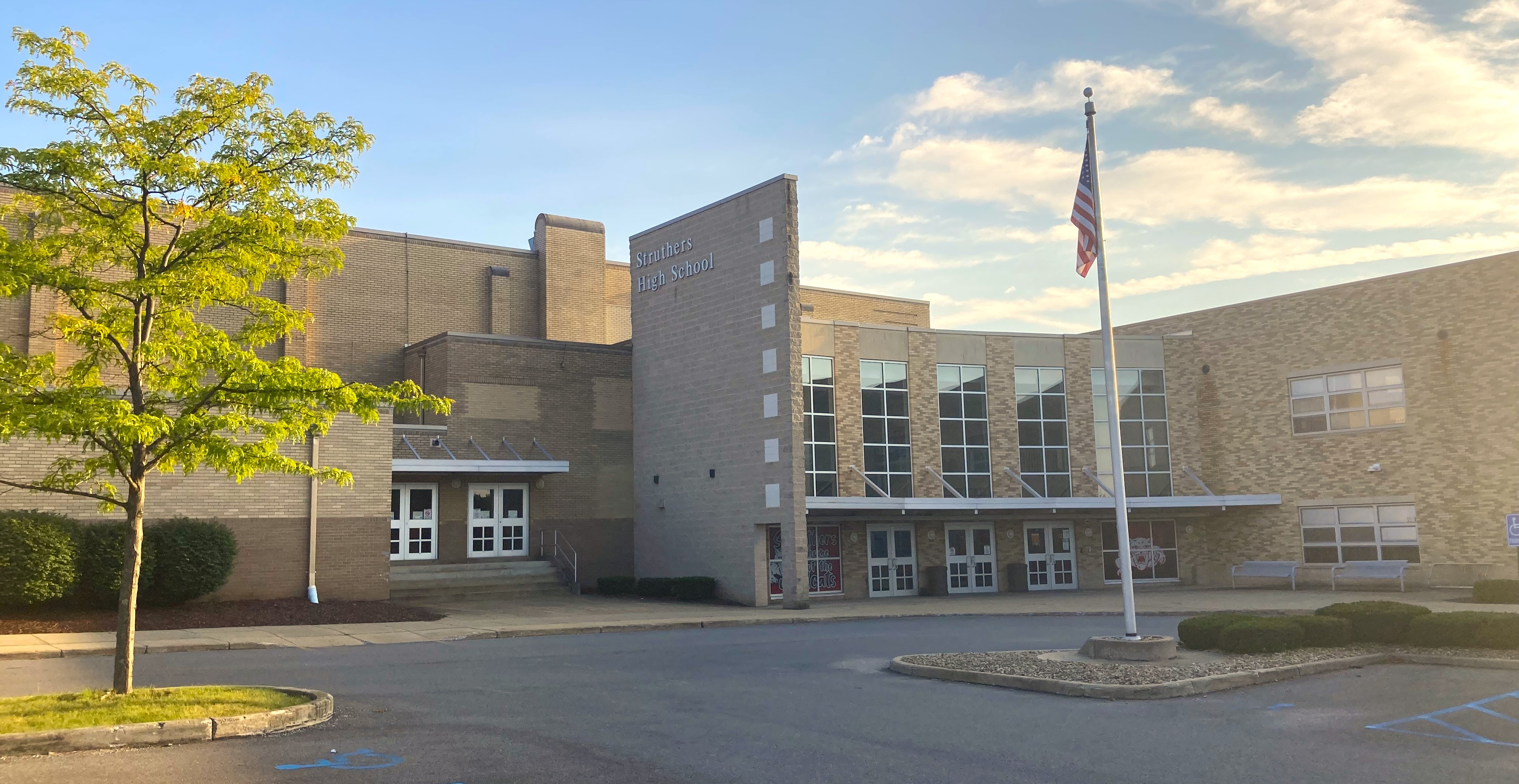

Location
- 111 Euclid Avenue; Struthers, Ohio 44471; United States

Information
- Type: Public high school
- School district: Struthers City School District
- Superintendent: Pete Pirone
- CEEB code: 364860
- Principal: Roger Day
- Vice Principal: Mark Carden
- Teaching staff: 31.50 (FTE)
- Grades: 9-12
- Student to teacher ratio: 15.78
- Campus type: Large Suburb
- Colors: Red and black
- Athletics conference: Northeast 8 Athletic Conference
- Team name: Wildcats
- Yearbook: Hopewell
- Website: shs.strutherscityschools.org

Struthers High School is a public high school in Struthers, Ohio, United States. It is the only high school in the Struthers City School District. Athletic teams are known as the Wildcats as a member of the Ohio High School Athletic Association in the Northeast 8 Athletic Conference.

== Accolades and Awards ==
According to the U.S. News & World Report, in 2016 Struthers High School was ranked 137th within Ohio and 2482nd Nationally. The school has a College Readiness Score of 22.4/100.0, with an Advanced Placement participation rate of 34% and Subject Proficiencies of 97% in English and 94% in Mathematics.

== Athletics ==
=== OHSAA State Championships ===
- Girls Basketball – 1978

== Notable alumni ==
- Steve Belichick - former professional football player in the National Football League (NFL), coach and scout.
- John Gerak - former professional football player in the National Football League (NFL)
- Paul Jenkins - abstract expressionist painter
- Andy Kosco, former professional baseball player in the Major League Baseball (MLB)
