= 1951 Miami Airlines C-46 crash =

1951 aviation accident in New Jersey

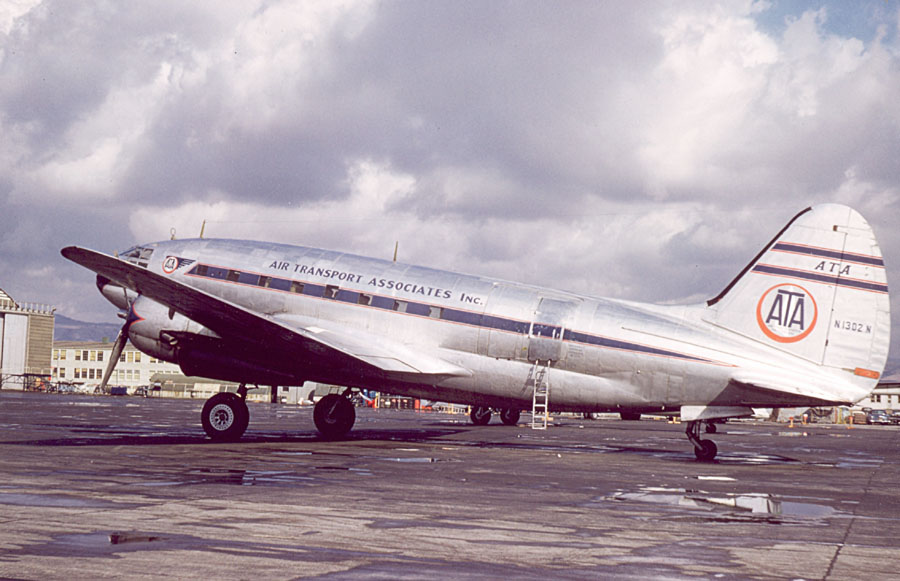
- A C-46F similar to the accident aircraft

Accident
- Date: December 16, 1951
- Summary: In-flight engine fire
- Site: Elizabeth, New Jersey, United States; 40.6667°N 74.2189°W

Aircraft
- Aircraft type: Curtiss C-46F-1-CU Commando
- Operator: Miami Airlines
- Registration: N1678M
- Flight origin: Newark Airport, New Jersey
- Destination: Tampa International Airport, Florida
- Occupants: 56
- Passengers: 52
- Crew: 4
- Fatalities: 56
- Survivors: 0

On December 16, 1951, a Miami Airlines Curtiss C-46 Commando airliner crashed in the city of Elizabeth, New Jersey, shortly after taking off from nearby Newark Airport. All 56 people on board were killed. At the time, it was the second-deadliest aviation accident on US soil, behind Northwest Orient Airlines Flight 2501.

== Aircraft and occupants ==
The aircraft involved in the accident, registered N1678M, was a Curtiss C-46F-1-CU Commando military aircraft that had been converted into a commercial airliner. It had first flown in 1945 and had logged a total of 4,138 flight hours during its career. It was powered by two Pratt & Whitney R-2800-51 Double Wasp engines. The aircraft's occupants on the accident flight consisted of 52 passengers and 4 crew, including the captain, C. A. Lyons of Miami, and Doris Ruby, a nightclub entertainer from New York City.

== Accident ==
The Miami Airlines C-46 was preparing for a non-scheduled non-stop passenger flight from Newark to Tampa. Of the aircraft's two engines, the right engine took longer to start up; people nearby saw smoke continuously coming from that engine. At around 3:00 PM EST, the flight taxied out to runway 28, and was cleared for takeoff at 3:03. Just after takeoff, however, Newark ATC personnel saw a trail of white smoke coming from the right side of the aircraft. The tower controller, concerned about the danger of there being a fire, pressed the airport crash alarm button. A Miami Airlines captain observing the takeoff from the ground also saw the smoke, which he believed was due to an overheated right brake. He telephoned the control tower and warned for the aircraft to keep its landing gear down or, if it had already been raised, to extend it. The tower relayed his warning to the flight crew of the C-46, who acknowledged and started the process of lowering the landing gear.

The aircraft continued ahead in the direction it took off in for a distance of about 4 miles (6.4 km), slowly gaining an altitude of approximately 800 to 1,000 feet (240 to 300 m). All throughout, the smoke progressively worsened; by the time the aircraft had reached the four-mile point, black smoke and actual flames could be seen trailing from the underside of the right engine nacelle. Shortly after the landing gear was lowered, a large burst of flames erupted from underneath the right nacelle. The aircraft banked left to an angle of about 10 degrees and continued onwards in this position for another 4.5 miles (7.2 km), gradually losing altitude as it went.

While flying over the nearby city of Elizabeth, the aircraft, at an estimated altitude of just 200 feet (61 m), suddenly lurched into a 90-degree left bank from which no recovery was possible. Although Captain Lyons managed to keep the aircraft from hitting the streets, apartment buildings, and a railroad depot below, the aircraft's left wingtip eventually struck the gabled roof of a vacant house near its ridge. The now-out-of-control aircraft then crashed nose-first into a one-story brick storage building owned by the Elizabeth Water Company before finally coming to rest on the banks of the Elizabeth River. The aircraft's load of fuel ignited immediately upon impact, engulfing both remains of the aircraft and the wrecked storage building in a raging inferno. Nearby firefighters quickly arrived on the scene and extinguished the fire after about 17 minutes.

The aircraft's wreckage came to rest in a generally inverted position and partially submerged in shallow water. All 52 passengers and 4 crew aboard the aircraft died, while another person on the ground was seriously injured.

== Aftermath ==
According to the accident report, the hold-down studs of the right engine's number 10 cylinder failed, setting off the fire that ultimately brought down the Miami Airlines C-46.

The accident was the first of three in Elizabeth, N.J. during the winter of 1951–52. Just over a month later, an American Airlines Convair 240 crashed while on final approach into Newark, killing all 23 people on board and seven on the ground. Less than a month after the second crash, a National Airlines DC-6 crashed into an apartment building, killing 29 of the 59 people on board and 4 people on the ground. Newark Airport was closed following the latter accident, and remained so until November 15, 1952.

The three crashes later provided the inspiration to writer and Elizabeth resident Judy Blume for her 2015 novel In the Unlikely Event.
