= Roy Doty =

American cartoonist and illustrator

Roy Edward Doty (September 10, 1922 – March 18, 2015) was an American cartoonist, artist and illustrator. He created humorous cartoon illustrations for books, packaging, advertising, comic strips, television and not-for-profit organization campaigns. He was one of only a dozen inductees into the National Cartoonists Society Hall of Fame. His former wife, Jean Slaughter Doty (1929–1991), was the author of several children's books.

== Life and career ==
Born in Chicago, Doty grew up in Columbus, Ohio, served in World War II as a U.S. Army cartoonist, and began his career in New York City as a freelance cartoonist in 1946. He freelanced for his entire career, never having an agent. From May 10 to October 4, 1953, he hosted the Sunday morning DuMont Television Network children's program The Roy Doty Show. From 1969 to late March 1972, he wrote and drew the syndicated comic strip Laugh-In, based on Rowan & Martin's Laugh-In.

His "Wordless Workshop", a popular home improvement series, ran as a syndicated feature for 50 years, starting in Popular Science (1953-1989) and ending its run in The Family Handyman magazine. His work was seen as part of the "Aha! Puzzle This" page in Make magazine. His work has appeared in The New York Times, Field & Stream, Popular Science, the (London) Daily Mail, Elle and many other magazines. He did several monthly newsletters, including a children's newsletter for the American Institute for Cancer Research. Some of his ad clients included Buick, Black & Decker, Ford, Macy's, Minute Maid, Mobil Oil, Texas Instruments and Perrier.

Into his nineties, he remained active as a freelance illustrator. Quoted in 2006, he said, "What could be nicer? I sit and draw funny pictures and people send me money." Doty died on March 18, 2015.

== Publications ==
Doty wrote 27 children's books and illustrated more than 170, including:

- Tales of a Fourth Grade Nothing by Judy Blume (1972)
- Otherwise Known as Sheila the Great by Judy Blume (1972)
- Superfudge by Judy Blume (1980)

== Awards ==
Doty was recognized for his work with the National Cartoonists Society's Reuben Illustrator of the Year Award (2006), Advertising Award (1978), Advertising and Illustration Award (1967, 1970, 1978, 1989, 1996 and 2005), Commercial Award (1989) and Greeting Card Award (1994). In 2011, his work was featured in an exhibition at the Billy Ireland Cartoon Library & Museum in Columbus, Ohio, where coincidentally, Doty grew up.
