= In the Unlikely Event (novel) =

2015 Judy Blume adult historical fiction

- First edition
- Author: Judy Blume
- Language: English
- Publisher: Alfred A. Knopf
- Publication date: 2015
- Publication place: United States
- Media type: Print
- Pages: 409 pp
- ISBN: 9781101875049
- OCLC: 904528759
- Dewey Decimal: 813.54
- LC Class: PS3552.L843

In the Unlikely Event is a 2015 novel by Judy Blume. It follows fifteen-year-old Miri Ammerman and her family and friends as they cope with three plane crashes from December 1951 to February 1952 in their home of Elizabeth, New Jersey. This was Blume's first adult book in 17 years and one of only four adult books she has written in her career.

== Plot introduction ==
In the Unlikely Event takes place in the early 1950s when the United States is dealing with the Korean War along with changing social norms. Miri Ammerman is the daughter of a single mother whose father left before she was born. Miri learns to negotiate a difficult adolescence with her loving family as they, and everyone in her hometown of Elizabeth, New Jersey, deal with the unexpected and unexplained rash of airplane crashes literally in their backyards.

The novel is based on three actual plane crashes that took place in Elizabeth, Blume's hometown, over the course of 58 days. The first accident occurred on December 16, 1951, with the plane crashing into the Elizabeth River. The second crash happened on January 22, 1952, and nearly hit the Battin High School for girls. The last crash was on February 11 of the same year and narrowly missed an orphanage.

== Awards ==
- Nominated for GoodReads Choice Awards 2015 for Best Historical Fiction
