= Otherwise Known as Sheila the Great =

1972 children's novel by Judy Blume

- First edition
- Author: Judy Blume
- Cover artist: Roy Doty
- Language: English
- Series: Fudge series
- Genre: Children's novel
- Publisher: Dutton
- Publication date: 1972
- Publication place: United States
- Media type: Print paperback
- Pages: 144 pp
- ISBN: 0-525-36455-2
- OCLC: 539880
- LC Class: PZ7.B6265 Ot
- Preceded by: Tales of a Fourth Grade Nothing
- Followed by: Superfudge

Otherwise Known as Sheila the Great is a children's novel by Judy Blume, first published in 1972. It is a spin-off novel to the Fudge series, being set shortly after Tales of a Fourth Grade Nothing, and centers on Peter Hatcher's nemesis, Sheila Tubman, and her family. Peter himself only appears briefly at the beginning and Fudge does not appear at all, although he is briefly mentioned.

== Plot ==
The book centers on Sheila Tubman, a 10-year-old girl who masks her insecurities with a much more self-assured, confident persona. In truth, she suffers from fears ranging from arachnophobia (fear of spiders and other arachnids), cynophobia (fear of dogs), and aquaphobia (fear of water).

Her family decides to spend summer in Tarrytown, New York, where she is enrolled at a day camp and meets Merle "Mouse" Ellis, an easygoing, courageous, and slightly tomboyish girl skilled with deep knowledge of yo-yo tricks. To Sheila's dismay, the family who owns the house they are staying in owns a dog named Jennifer, who Sheila fears and avoids. Her anxiety escalates when she learns of Jennifer's pregnancy and the desire of her sister, Libby, to adopt one of the puppies.

Meanwhile, Sheila is enlisted in swimming lessons to her chagrin, but she manages to take the final exam and earn a beginner's certificate. At camp, she single-handedly starts a camp newspaper, which proves difficult. Ultimately, she hands over editorship to two teenage boys named Allen and Paul after they complete a crossword puzzle she wrote, for which she promised a prize but forgot to name it. She even succeeds in painting the backdrop set for the camp's theatrical production of Peter Pan.

Sheila believes that her fearless masquerade is effective, but her beliefs are proven false after the guests at her sleepover write otherwise in a slam book activity. Despite the brawl that ensues between them, devastated by the insults written in each other's books, their friendship, nevertheless, continues, and Sheila slowly overcomes her fears (albeit not entirely) little by little. As summer draws to a close with a barbecue, she is unshaken at the thought of her family's adoption of a puppy, and realizes that she enjoyed her vacation after all.

== Major characters ==
Sheila Tubman – the main protagonist who is excited about being in Tarrytown for the summer, but has many fears, and has a hard time admitting those fears.

Libby Tubman – Sheila's thirteen-year-old sister, an aspiring dancer who is boy crazy and fancies herself to be sophisticated and glamorous, even calling her parents "Mother" and "Father".

Merle "Mouse" Ellis – Sheila's friend in Tarrytown, who is the junior champion of yo-yoing. She's a champion swimmer, and a dog lover. One chapter deals with her sneaking into her own house through the milk door so the girls can play hide and seek when bad weather precludes them from doing so outdoors.

Sondra and Jane Van Arden – the Van Arden twins, who are good friends with Sheila and Mouse. They both are very excellent swimmers and both get easily offended. They all get into an argument at a sleepover, but later make amends. They also participate in the indoor game of hide and seek at the Ellis house, known to all four girls as "the Mouse House". Sheila describes Sondra as being a little on the plump side, but prefers her over Jane, who is said to dunk people at the community pool.

Marty – Sheila's swimming teacher, who struggles to work with her because of her aquaphobia. Boy crazy Libby thinks he's gorgeous. When Sheila admits her problem to him, he works out a plan for her to prepare for the beginner's test. He is last seen at her house, having been invited by Mr. Tubman to attend his end of summer barbecue. Sheila at first failed to recognize him, then thinking it odd to see him on dry land and in street attire.

== Minor characters ==
Betsy Ellis – Mouse's younger sister, who is only 4 years old, but an excellent diver. She drags around a candy box on a string, which is a pretend dog she calls Ootch, due to her allergy to real dogs.

Denise – a counselor at the summer camp who teaches pottery. She never wears shoes because, as Sheila discovers, the bottoms of her feet are "covered in warts". She also chaperones a haunted hayride, where she convinces Sheila to stop hiding from her fears on that.

Maryanne – an attractive teenage girl at the summer camp who wins the part of Wendy in the camp's production of Peter Pan due to being a better singer than Libby. Despite Libby's annoyance at not getting the role, they become friends.

Allen and Paul – two teenage boys from the summer camp who are the only ones to complete Sheila's crossword puzzle of naming all the camp counselors. When they ask for their prize, she gives them the camp newspaper. However, they seem to be more appreciative and competent at running it than her, also changing its name from Newsdate with Sheila the Great to Allen and Paul: Tell All.

Mrs. Reese – a neighbor of the Tubmans from Manhattan. She has a small dog named Baby, who is the only one Sheila can stand prior to overcoming her fear of them.

Bobby – the boy whose room Sheila stays in while his family is vacationing in England. She is dismayed at sleeping in a boy's room, having convinced herself the house would be girlie. The Tubmans later see a letter from him expressing his disdain at having a girl in his room and announcing he acquired a bunch of model planes and ships which he will take back home.

Peter Hatcher – Sheila's classmate and star of the preceding book, only seen when he shares an elevator ride with her and his dog, Turtle, whom she fears. He is also mentioned in the middle of the night when she sees a real spider and must overcome her fear of it, remembering how back in school he tried to scare her with a fake one but she didn't fall for it (but it scared their teacher and he got three days of detention).

Freddie – a lifeguard at the community pool and yet another young man whom Libby finds appealing. She always flirts with him at his guardstand and runs to fetch him beverages. Upon finding out he already has a girlfriend, however, she loses her spark for him.

== Dedication ==
Judy Blume dedicated the book to her parents, especially to her father, as she writes "In memory of my father, and our special game of hide and seek".

== Reception ==
Kirkus Reviews commented on the novel stating:

Judy Blume is a careful student of such childhood customs as slumber parties, playing "cooties" and eating Oreo cookies from the inside out, and Sheila's ongoing crisis of image ("Other kids get Home Free. Why not me?") is as easy To identify with as it is to laugh at.

== Revised editions ==
The post-2002 reprints of the book have some lines edited and a bit of new content added to update the technology use in it (for instance, record players are replaced with CD players, and the summer camp's copy machine keeps malfunctioning, which is why Sheila must use a mimeograph machine, whereas the original had them already still using theirs and not having a copy machine yet).
