= Doris Ruby =

American dancer

Doris Ruby (1927 – December 16, 1951) was a 24-year-old dancer from Sunnyside, Queens who died in the 1951 Miami Airlines C-46 crash. She was a popular nightclub entertainer.

== Club performer ==
She opened at the Apollo Theatre in Harlem in late April 1951. Ruby appeared with Fran Warren and Danny Thomas at the Latin Casino in Philadelphia, Pennsylvania, in early May. She teamed with George Price and Betty Reilly at the Capri in Atlantic Beach, New York in mid-June. She was romantically linked to Paul Thomas, brother of Danny Thomas, at this time.

== Untimely death ==
Ruby was booked to dance at the Vagabond Club, on Biscayne Boulevard, in Miami, Florida, the week after her death. She had most recently appeared at the Cafe Society in New York City. She appeared briefly on WJZ prior to preparing for her fatal flight to Florida. WJZ had broadcast from Howie's Restaurant on the Avenue of the Americas between 52nd and 53rd Streets in Manhattan. She had been in Hanson's Drug Store, 51st Street and 7th Avenue, only a few hours prior to boarding the plane. This was a popular celebrity hangout.

Gregg Sherwood, showgirl and best friend of Ruby, tried to discourage her from flying the night before her death. Sherwood told Ruby that if she had ten days before her Miami opening, she could likely get a cancellation on a better airline. 56 people died on the nonscheduled airliner which crashed in Elizabeth, New Jersey.

The American Guild of Variety Artists held a benefit for Ruby's family, who were destitute following her death. She was their main support. Walter Winchell reported that Ruby might have flown to Florida earlier if the last night club she appeared in had paid her on time. AGVA, the actors' union, paid her out of the owners' bond (to guarantee wages). This occurred belatedly, a week after she made flying plans.
