= American Airlines Flight 6780 =

1952 aviation accident

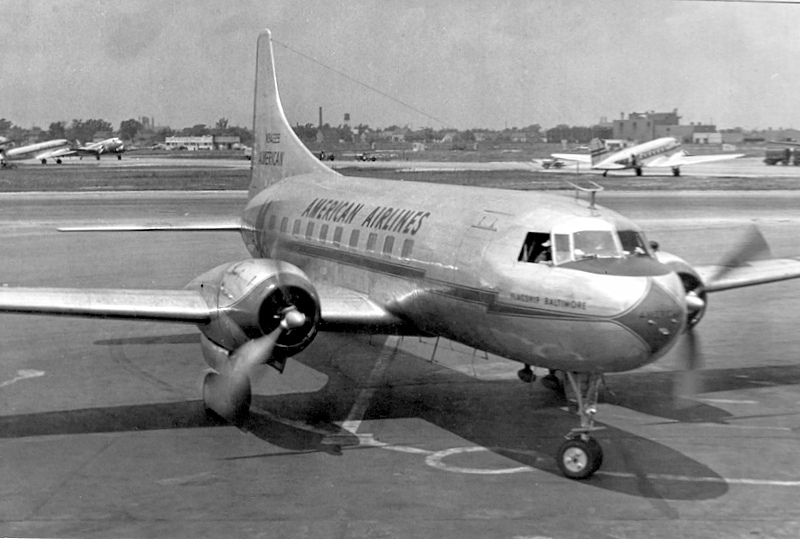
- N94229, the aircraft involved in the accident, in 1950

Accident
- Date: January 22, 1952
- Summary: CFIT on approach for reasons unknown
- Site: Elizabeth, New Jersey, United States; 40.6579°N 74.2144°W
- Total fatalities: 30

Aircraft
- Aircraft type: Convair CV-240-0
- Aircraft name: Flagship New Haven
- Operator: American Airlines
- Registration: N94229
- Flight origin: Buffalo Municipal Airport, New York, U.S.
- 1st stopover: Rochester Municipal Airport, Rochester, New York, U.S.
- Last stopover: Hancock Airport, New York, U.S.
- Destination: Newark International Airport, New Jersey, U.S.
- Occupants: 23
- Passengers: 20
- Crew: 3
- Fatalities: 23
- Survivors: 0

Ground casualties
- Ground fatalities: 7

American Airlines Flight 6780, the first fatal crash of a Convair 240, occurred on January 22, 1952.

The twin-propeller aircraft was on the routing Buffalo-Rochester-Syracuse-Newark. On final approach to runway 6 at Newark Airport using the instrument landing system, it crashed at 3:45 p.m. into a house at the intersection of Williamson and South Streets, in the city of Elizabeth, New Jersey, approximately 3.4 miles (5.5 km) southwest of Newark. The cause of the crash was never determined.

The plane, which had gone 2,100 feet (640 m) off course to the right, narrowly missed hitting the Battin High School for girls, which had dismissed for the day only 45 minutes before.

== Casualties ==
All 23 occupants on board (20 passengers and 3 crew), plus 7 people on the ground, were killed in the crash and ensuing fire.

The Captain, Thomas J. Reid, whose home was only blocks from the crash scene, had recently returned from an airlift to Japan; his wife heard the crash and told reporters that they had been planning to move to a house they had constructed in Point Pleasant, New Jersey.

Among the passengers was Robert P. Patterson, a jurist and former Undersecretary of War under Franklin Delano Roosevelt and former War Secretary under Harry S. Truman. Patterson was returning from meeting Thomas J. Watson of IBM, who had just hired him for a new case on the previous day. Patterson had finished a federal case in Buffalo earlier than expected the day before, and changed his rail ticket in for the aircraft seat, according to the Jan 23 edition of the Deseret News.

== Aftermath ==
This was the second in a string of three crashes to hit the town of Elizabeth in less than two months. On December 16, 1951, a Miami Airlines C-46 had crashed into the Elizabeth River shortly after take-off, with 56 people on board and no survivors.

The third crash, National Airlines Flight 101, on February 11, 1952, killed 29 of the 63 people on board and narrowly missed an orphanage. Following a public outcry, Newark Airport was immediately closed by the Port of New York Authority and remained so for nine months, until November 15. The State of New York passed a bill requiring operators to approach airports over water wherever possible.

President Harry Truman launched a temporary commission of inquiry, headed by Jimmy Doolittle, to study the effects of airports on their neighbors. The report recommended the establishment of effective zoning laws to prevent the erection of schools, hospitals and other places of assembly under final approach paths.

The three crashes later provided the inspiration to writer and Elizabeth resident Judy Blume for her 2015 novel In the Unlikely Event.

== Sources ==
- Report - Civil Aeronautics Board - PDF
  - Amendment - PDF
- "Plane Crash" The Herald-Press, January 23, 1952. St. Joseph, Michigan. pp. 1, 6
- "Airliner Crash Deaths Reach 28" The Deseret News January 23, 1952. pp. 1,2
- "Patterson called Great American by Truman" Pittsburgh Post-Gazette January 23, 1952, pp. 1,3
