= Mahoning Valley (geographic) =

Valley in Ohio and Pennsylvania, US

Coordinates: 41°15′N 80°43′W

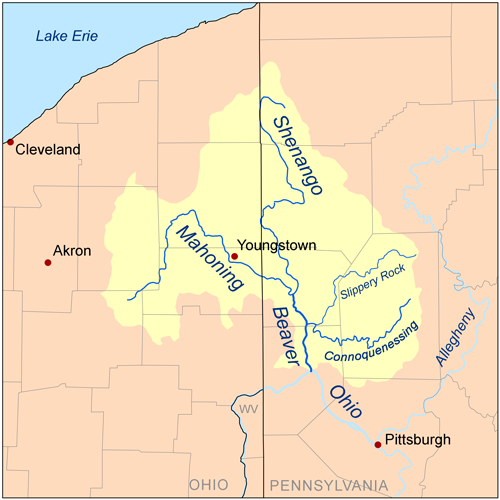
Mahoning Valley in Northeast Ohio and Western Pennsylvania

The Mahoning Valley is a geographic valley encompassing Northeast Ohio and a small portion of Western Pennsylvania that drains into the Mahoning River. According to information at the bottom of Page 321 in a publication by the Ohio Secretary of State's Office, the river name comes from an Native American word meaning “at the licks.”

== Geography ==
Downstream of Youngstown, Ohio through Struthers and Lowellville in Ohio and Edinburg in Pennsylvania, the river runs through a significant valley. In contrast and notwithstanding some shallow reservoirs and short waterfalls, the river upstream of there flowing through Newton Falls and Warren encounters less relief in the ground and the terrain is largely flat right up to the riverbank. Therefore, the term "Mahoning Valley" is generally applied locally only to the lower portion of the drainage unless addressing the Youngstown–Warren, OH-PA Combined Statistical Area which is also often referred to colloquially as the "Mahoning Valley" for the purposes of referring to issues such as job opportunities and housing markets.

== Other places named Mahoning Valley ==
There are also several other locales, most in the state of Pennsylvania, where the term "Mahoning Valley" are applied. There are four townships in Indiana County that include the name "Mahoning": East, West, North, and South Mahoning Townships near Mahoning Creek which flows into the Allegheny River north of Templeton.

There is also Mahoning Township, Armstrong County, Pennsylvania, downstream on the same creek, Mahoning Township, Montour County, Pennsylvania, where there is another Mahoning Creek which flows into the Susquehanna River near Danville, and Mahoning Township, Carbon County, Pennsylvania, on yet another Mahoning Creek which flows into the Lehigh River at Lehighton and from there into the Delaware River. Near these communities are various businesses such as a nursing home, golf course, race track, cinema, butcher shop, mini-storage, and auto parts store, that have incorporated "Mahoning Valley" into their name. There is also Mahoning Valley Christian Camp near Rushville, Indiana.

== See also ==
- Mahoning River
- Youngstown–Warren–Boardman metropolitan area
