= William H. Calbreath =

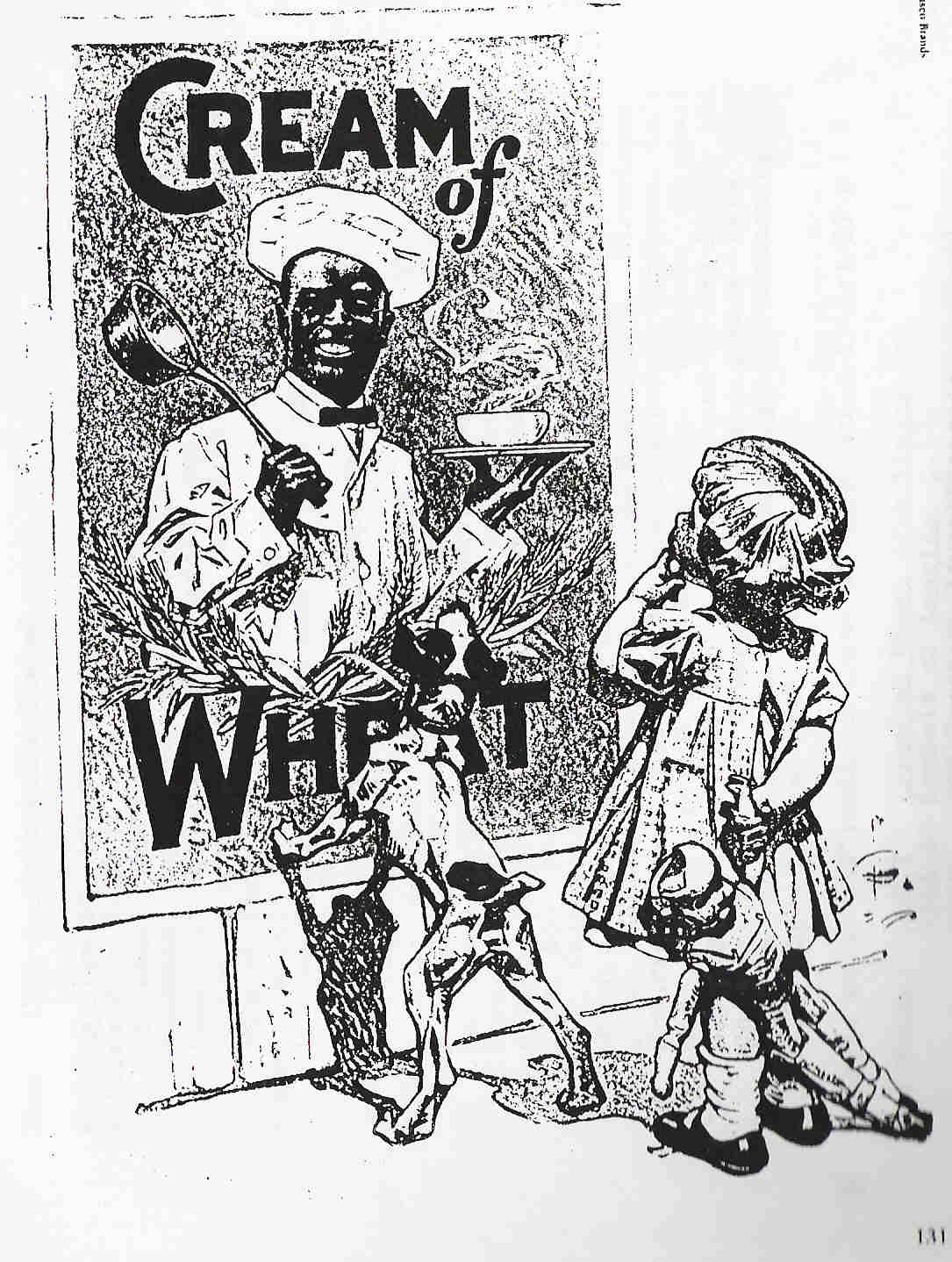
1909 Cream of Wheat advertisement

William H. Calbreath (July 29, 1850 – May 26, 1944) claimed to have been the model for the Cream of Wheat trademark, one of the most enduring images in the history of American advertising.

== Early years ==
Calbreath was born in Detroit, Michigan, to a former slave who had been freed about 15 years before the outbreak of the American Civil War. Several years after the war, he took a position as a cook at a Detroit restaurant. From there, he served as a chef at Put-in-Bay, Mackinac Island, the Detroit's Star Island clubhouse. His skills as a chef also earned him a stint at New York City's famed Delmonico's.

== Contested claim ==
Calbreath claimed that he served as the model for the original Cream of Wheat trademark, which was used by the company from the early 1900s to about 1925. At that point, the original trademark was modified. Calbreath's claim has never been officially confirmed, though it has been widely reported in newspapers in northeastern Ohio, where he settled later in life.

== Later years ==
Calbreath spent his last years in Struthers, Ohio, a town located near the industrial center of Youngstown. Until his retirement, he was employed as a coal dealer. Calbreath died at the age of 93, surviving his wife, Addie, and a daughter, Mrs. B. Graves, of Detroit.
