= Jake Richardson =

American actor (born 1985)

- Born: Jacob Matthew Richardson; February 20, 1985 (age 41); Van Nuys, California, U.S.
- Occupation: Actor
- Years active: 1995–present

Jacob Matthew Richardson (born February 20, 1985) is an American actor. He is perhaps best known for his roles in the film Honey, We Shrunk Ourselves and the series Fudge.

== Career ==
Richardson landed his first acting role in 1995 at the age of nine on the ABC series Fudge, based on the stories of Judy Blume. Soon after, he appeared in the series The Nanny and as Blade in Problem Child 3: Junior in Love.

Though silent through 1996, Richardson soon starred in Walt Disney Pictures' 1997 classic Honey, We Shrunk Ourselves as Mitch. He played a minor role in the Disney film Toothless, alongside Kirstie Alley, Ross Malinger, and directed by Melanie Mayron. He appeared in the independent film "Little Cobras" as Derek. Though not having a big following, the movie was screened at the Cannes Film Festival.

Richardson starred as Reggie Van Dough in the 1998 Warner Home Video family comedy Richie Rich's Christmas Wish. He then made an appearance on the drama 7th Heaven as the troubled young boy, Johnny Morton.

In 2001, Richardson fulfilled one of his dreams of working with Kevin Smith, making a small cameo in Jay and Silent Bob Strike Back.

Throughout 2002, Richardson starred in many TV shows including NYPD Blue, Need You Know, and Boston Public. He also appeared in TV Movie Homeward Bound.

Richardson also starred in the 2002 movie, The Dangerous Lives of Altar Boys, produced by Jodie Foster.

The 2003 movie Hangman's Curse, based on a Christian novel by Frank Peretti, Richardson plays the gothic character of Ian Snyder. He starred in many TV shows before working again with Kevin Smith in the 2006 hit Clerks II. Shortly after, Richardson starred in the TV series Cold Case as troubled teen Trevor Dawson.

== Personal life ==
He was born in Van Nuys, California, the son of Tim and Chris Richardson.

== Awards ==
- 1996 Young Artist Award: Nomination for Best Performance by a Young Actor – TV Comedy Series for Fudge.

== Filmography ==
Year	Film	Role	Notes	Ref
1995	Fudge	Peter Hatcher	Main role as Fudge's older brother	
1995	The Nanny	Willie	"A Fine Friendship"	
1995	Problem Child 3: Junior in Love	Blade	TV movie	
1997	Little Cobras: Operation Dalmatian	Derek		
1997	Honey, We Shrunk Ourselves	Mitch Szalinski	Direct-to-video	
1997	Toothless	Jeff	TV movie	
1997	C-16: FBI		"Russian Winter"	
1998	Richie Rich's Christmas Wish	Reggie Van Dough	Direct-to-video	
1998	7th Heaven	Johnny	"Johnny Get You Gun"	
2001	Jay and Silent Bob Strike Back	Teen #1		
2002	The Dangerous Lives of Altar Boys	Wade Scalisi		
2002	Homeward Bound	Alex Ashton	TV movie	
2002	NYPD Blue	Travis	"A Little Dad'll Do Ya"	
2002	Need You Know	Teddy		
2002	Boston Public	Joe Coolidge	"Chapter Fifty-One" & "Chapter Fifty-Two"	
2003	Hangman's Curse	Ian Snyder		
2003	Monk	Dwayne	"Mr. Monk and the Sleeping Suspect"	
2003	Touched by an Angel	JZ	"The Show Must Not Go On"	
2005	Invasion	Gage		
2005	ER	Ian Summerlin	"The Human Shield	
2006	Cold Case	Trevor Dawson	"Detention"	
2006	Clerks II	Teen #1		
2006	Bones	Brian Andrews	"Headless Witch In The Woods"	
2006	Medium	Tyler Downey	"Raising Cain"	
2007	House	Stevie Lipa	"Needle in a Haystack"	
2007	Boston Legal	Graham	"The Bride Wore Blood"	
2007	Criminal Minds	Johnny Mulford	"Open Season"	
2007	Journeyman	Dewey Boyd	"The Hanged Man"	
2008	In Treatment	Ian Weston		
2008	Garden Party	Kevin		
2008	Saving Grace	Connor	"It's a Fierce, White-Hot, Mighty Love"	
2011	Supernatural	Johnny	"Mannequin 3: The Reckoning"	
2011	Cinema Verite	Tommy Goodwin		
2011	NCIS: Los Angeles	Drew Stetson	"Imposters"	
2011	The Booth at the End	Richard		
2011	The Family Tree	Roy		
2011	The Mentalist	Mike Flynn	"Ring Around the Rosie"	
2011	Suburgatory	Frontman	"Sweet Sixteen"	
2019	Jay and Silent Bob Reboot	Teen #1		
2022	Clerks III	Auditioner #17		
2022-2024	Good Trouble	Adam	8 episodes	
