= Struthers, Ohio =

- City
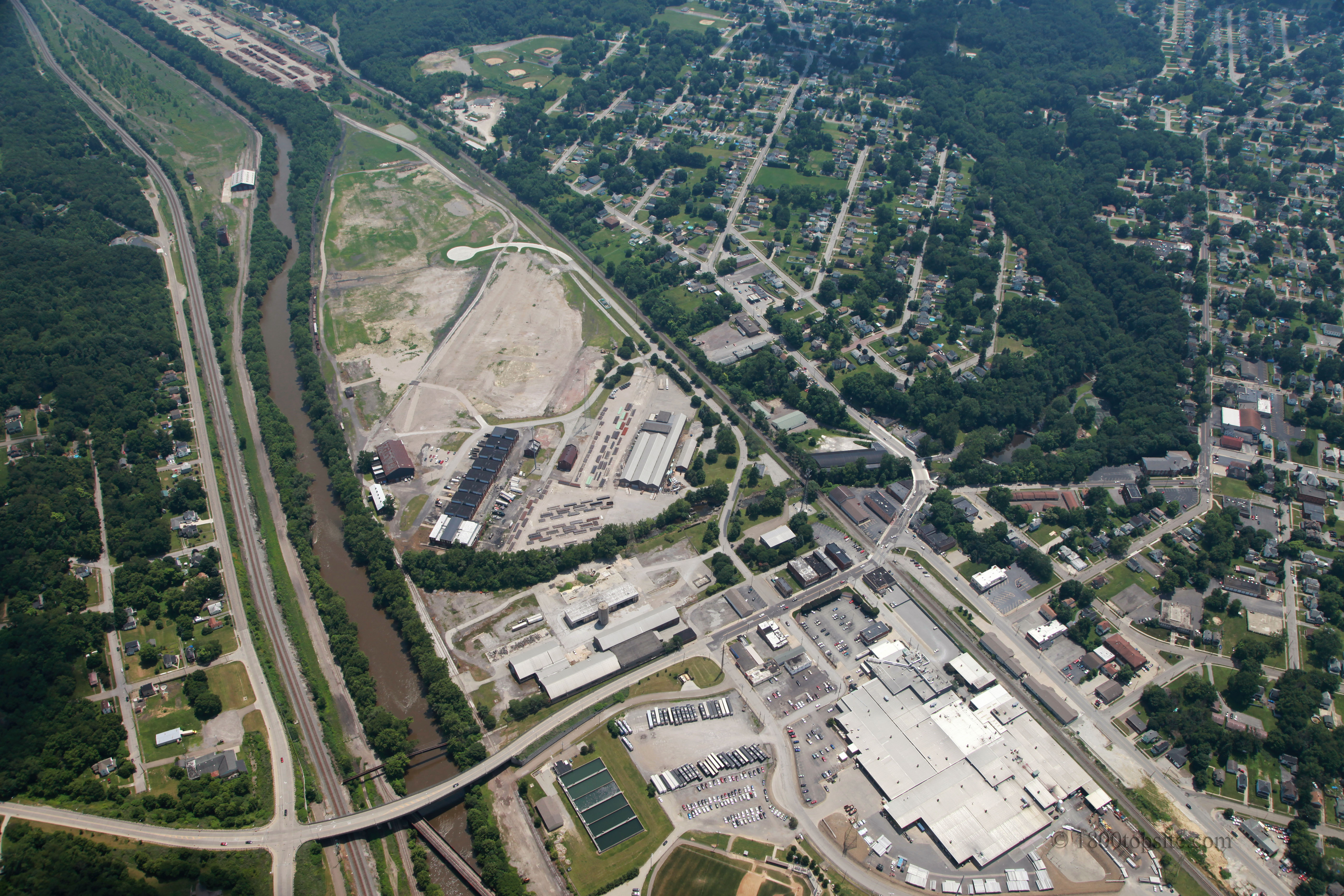
- Aerial view of the city

- Seal Logo
- Motto: "The City with Heart in the Heart of It All"
- Interactive map of Struthers, Ohio
- Location within Ohio Location within the United States
- Coordinates: 41°03′04″N 80°35′31″W
- Country: United States
- State: Ohio
- County: Mahoning

Area
  - Total: 3.74 sq mi (9.68 km^{2})
  - Land: 3.64 sq mi (9.43 km^{2})
  - Water: 0.097 sq mi (0.25 km^{2})
- Elevation: 955 ft (291 m)

Population (2020)
  - Total: 10,063
  - Density: 2,763.9/sq mi (1,067.15/km^{2})
- Time zone: UTC-5 (Eastern (EST))
  - Summer (DST): UTC-4 (EDT)
- ZIP code: 44471
- Area codes: 234/330
- FIPS code: 39-75126
- GNIS feature ID: 1086572
- Website: https://www.cityofstruthers.com/

Struthers is a city in eastern Mahoning County, Ohio, United States, along the Mahoning River. The population was 10,063 at the 2020 census. Located directly southeast of Youngstown, it is a suburb in the Youngstown–Warren metropolitan area.

== History ==
John Struthers, from Washington County, Pennsylvania, purchased 400 acres (1.6 km^{2}) of Poland Township land in 1798 and gave it the name Marbletown. John Struthers owned this land until the War of 1812 came around when he and his family suffered financial ruin. The land was dormant until 1865 when it was purchased by Thomas Struthers. Thomas bought this land to honor his father and he was instrumental in bringing industry and railroads to the town. Eventually, the town name was changed to Struthers by popular vote.

In 1943, a Jehovah's Witness was fined by the city for distributing religious pamphlets door-to-door. The U.S. Supreme Court ruled that this was a violation of the First Amendment in Martin v. Struthers.

=== Influence of steel ===
The community's early history centers on Yellow Creek, where the cradle of steel began with the building of the Hopewell Furnace. This furnace was built in 1803 by Daniel Eaton and was mentioned in the first line of the 1995 Bruce Springsteen song "Youngstown". The Hopewell Furnace thrived for a little over ten years until John Struthers reached his financial crisis in 1812.

In 1869, Struthers again became an iron-producing community with the construction of the Anna Furnace by the Struthers Iron Company. In 1880, the sheet mill plant of the Summer's Brothers Co. was added and in 1888, the plant of the J. A. and D. P. Cooper Gear Company was constructed.

With all these activities, Struthers still remained a village of less than 1,000 inhabitants, after 100 years had elapsed since John Struthers built his first cabin and erected the sawmill and grist mill on Yellow Creek. In 1899, Struthers was brought into closer communication with Youngstown and the upper Mahoning Valley by the completion of an interurban electric line.

In 1902, the neighboring village of East Youngstown (now Campbell) was started. This new community was started shortly after the incorporation of the Youngstown Iron Sheet and Tube Company (known as the Youngstown Sheet and Tube Co., since 1905).

With the steel industry booming in the early part of the 1900s, immigrants from throughout Europe flooded into Struthers. Still a village when it was officially incorporated in 1902, Struthers quickly became a city in 1920. The steel industry allowed the city to flourish until 1977, when several area plants closed their doors for good. The city padded the loss of thousands of jobs by using its industrial infrastructure to lure non-steel making jobs, but population losses have continued throughout the start of the new century.

== Geography ==
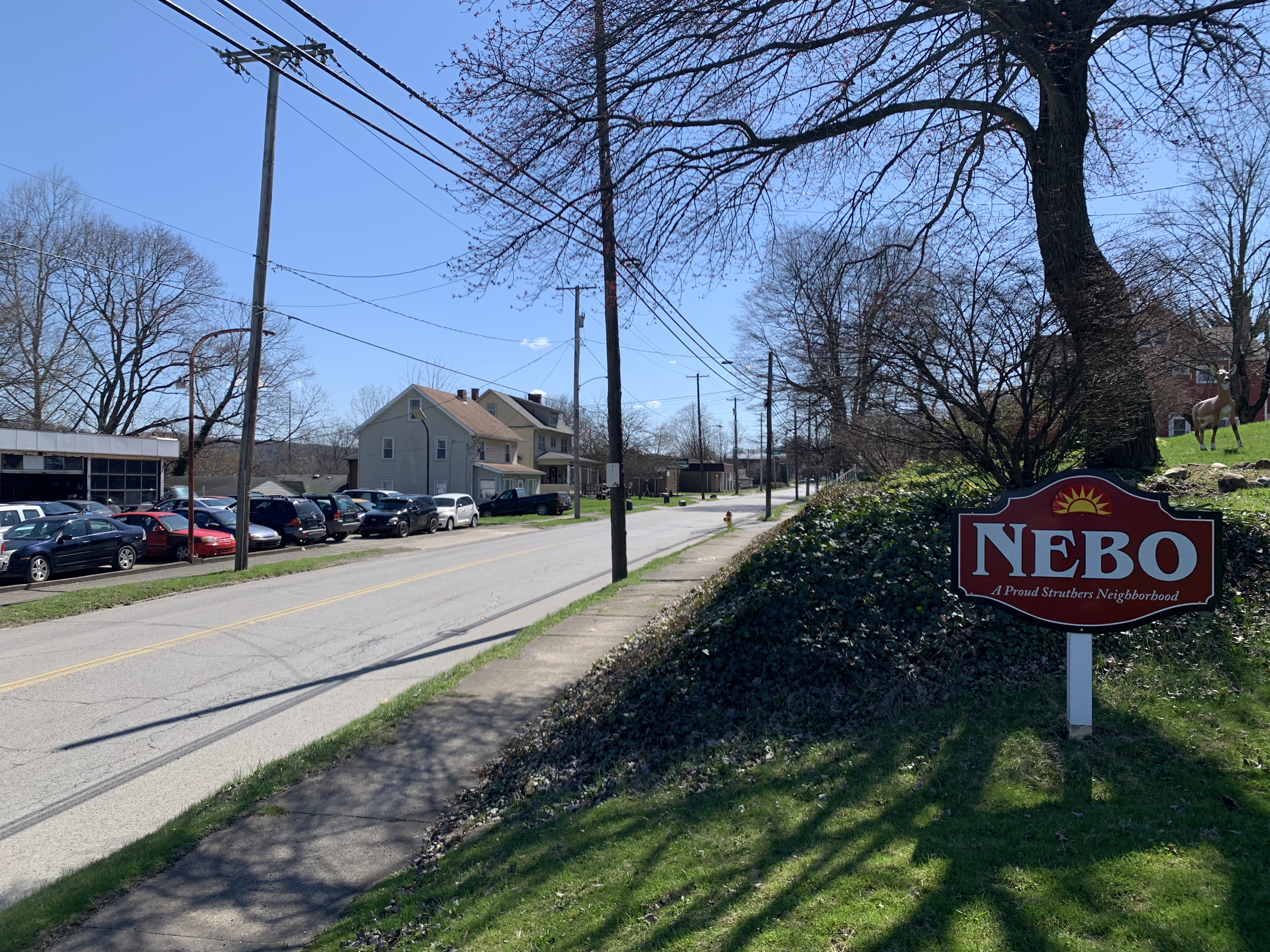
The Nebo neighborhood in eastern Struthers historically contained a significant Slavic American population.

Struthers is located on the banks of the Mahoning River about 4 miles (6.4 km) west of the border between Ohio and Pennsylvania at the intersection of Ohio State Route 616 and Ohio State Route 289. The larger part of the city is across the river from State Route 289 on the south side of the river.

According to the United States Census Bureau, the city has a total area of 3.74 square miles (9.69 km^{2}), of which 3.64 square miles (9.43 km^{2}) is land and 0.10 square miles (0.26 km^{2}) is water.

=== Neighborhoods ===
- Downtown
- Nebo
- North Hill
- Lyon Plat
- Coke Alley

== Demographics ==
Historical population
Census	Pop.	Note	%±
1910	3,370		—
1920	5,847		73.5%
1930	11,249		92.4%
1940	11,739		4.4%
1950	11,941		1.7%
1960	15,631		30.9%
1970	15,343		−1.8%
1980	13,609		−11.3%
1990	12,284		−9.7%
2000	11,756		−4.3%
2010	10,713		−8.9%
2020	10,063		−6.1%
2025 (est.)	9,837		−2.2%

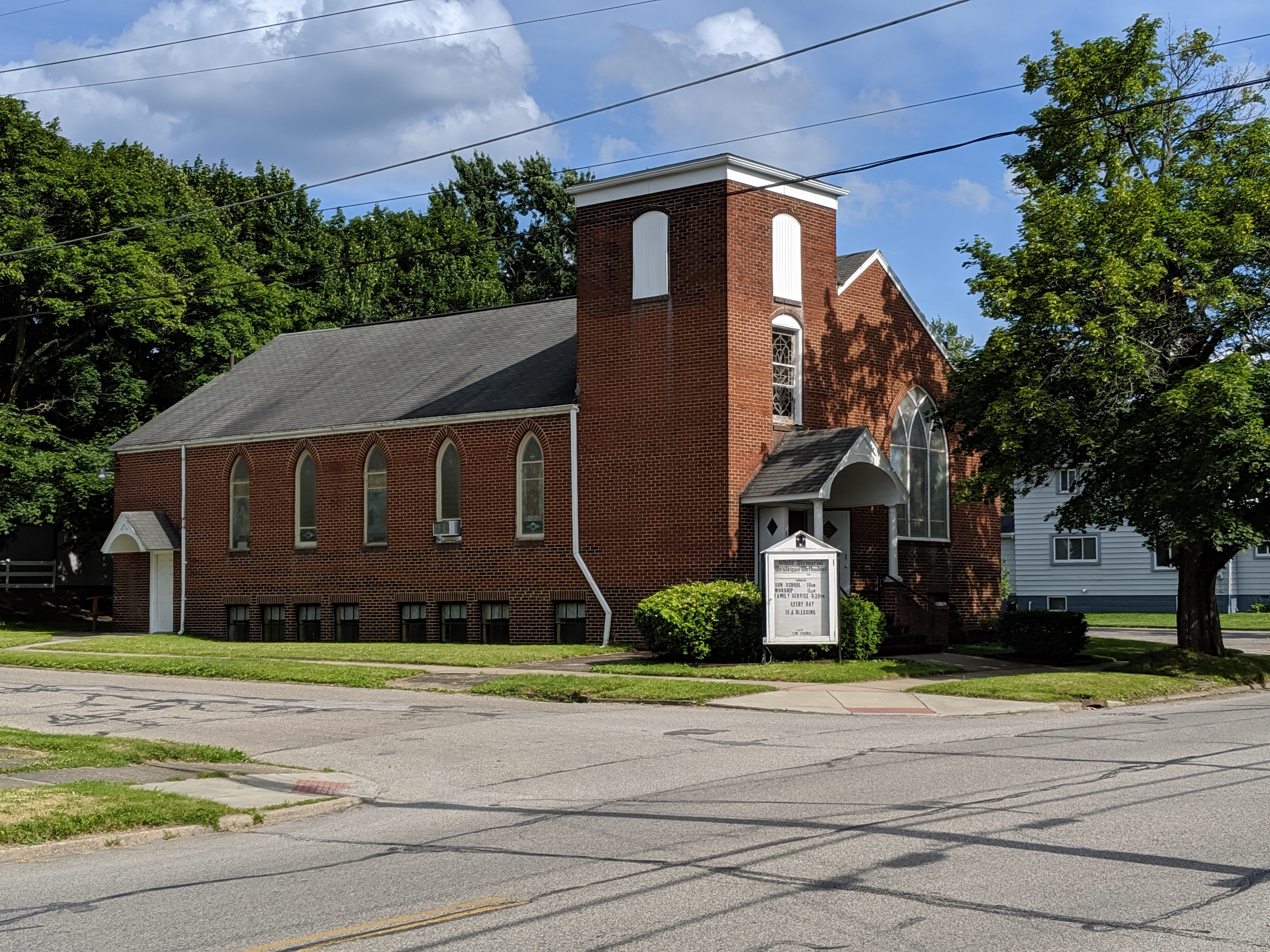
White Memorial Wesleyan Methodist Church in Struthers, Ohio

=== 2020 census ===
As of the 2020 census, Struthers had a population of 10,063. The median age was 41.6 years; 21.0% of residents were under the age of 18, and 19.1% were 65 years of age or older. For every 100 females there were 93.3 males, and for every 100 females age 18 and over there were 90.2 males age 18 and over.

As of the 2020 census, 99.8% of residents lived in urban areas, while 0.2% lived in rural areas.

As of the 2020 census, there were 4,336 households in Struthers, of which 27.0% had children under the age of 18 living in them. Of all households, 36.5% were married-couple households, 20.9% were households with a male householder and no spouse or partner present, and 33.4% were households with a female householder and no spouse or partner present. About 32.4% of all households were made up of individuals and 14.6% had someone living alone who was 65 years of age or older.

As of the 2020 census, there were 4,766 housing units, of which 9.0% were vacant. The homeowner vacancy rate was 1.7% and the rental vacancy rate was 9.7%.

Racial composition as of the 2020 census
Race	Number	Percent
White	8,668	86.1%
Black or African American	475	4.7%
American Indian and Alaska Native	19	0.2%
Asian	51	0.5%
Native Hawaiian and Other Pacific Islander	6	0.1%
Some other race	153	1.5%
Two or more races	691	6.9%
Hispanic or Latino (of any race)	586	5.8%

=== 2010 census ===
As of the 2010 census, there were 10,713 people, 4,382 households, and 2,886 families residing in the city. The population density was 2,943.1 inhabitants per square mile (1,136.3/km^{2}). There were 4,886 housing units at an average density of 1,342.3 per square mile (518.3/km^{2}). The racial makeup of the city was 94.3% White, 2.9% African American, 0.2% Native American, 0.2% Asian, 0.6% from other races, and 1.9% from two or more races. Hispanic or Latino of any race were 3.1% of the population. By ethnicity, 28.4% of residents were of Italian, 25.0% German, 20.0% Irish, 13.2% Slovak, 8.5% English, and 7.7% Polish ancestries. In addition, 95.9% spoke English, 1.5% Italian, 1.1% Spanish, and 1.0% Slovak.

There were 4,382 households, of which 30.1% had children under the age of 18 living with them, 42.6% were married couples living together, 17.4% had a female householder with no husband present, 5.9% had a male householder with no wife present, and 34.1% were non-families. Also, 28.9% of all households were made up of individuals, and 14.2% had someone living alone who was 65 years of age or older. The average household size was 2.43 and the average family size was 2.97.

The median age in the city was 41.4 years. 22.2% of residents were under the age of 18; 8.9% were between the ages of 18 and 24; 23.5% were from 25 to 44; 27.6% were from 45 to 64; and 18% were 65 years of age or older. The gender makeup of the city was 47.6% male and 52.4% female.

=== 2000 census ===
As of the 2000 census, there were 11,756 people, 4,704 households, and 3,255 families residing in the city. The population density was 3,150.2/sq. mile (1,216.9/km^{2}). There were 4,982 housing units at an average density of 1,335.0/sq. mile (515.7/km^{2}). The racial makeup of the city was 96.63% White, 1.78% African American, 0.19% Native American, 0.19% Asian, 0.01% Pacific Islander, 0.47% from other races, and 0.74% from two or more races. Hispanic or Latino of any race were 2.02% of the population.

There were 4,704 households, out of which 29.6% had children under the age of 18 living with them, 51.3% were married couples living together, 13.6% had a female householder with no husband present, and 30.8% were non-families. 27.4% of all households were made up of individuals, and 15.8% had someone living alone who was 65 years of age or older. The average household size was 2.49 and the average family size was 3.03.

In the city, the population was spread out, with 23.3% under the age of 18, 8.7% from 18 to 24, 27.0% from 25 to 44, 20.0% from 45 to 64, and 20.9% who were 65 years of age or older. The median age was 39.5 years. For every 100 females, there were 88.3 males. For every 100 females age 18 and over, there were 84.7 males.

The median income for a household in the city was $30,720, and the median income for a family was $37,212. Males had a median income of $30,588 versus $21,438 for females. The per capita income for the city was $15,587. About 8.8% of families and 12.0% of the population were below the poverty line, including 18.9% of those under age 18 and 10.8% of those age 65 or over.

== Government ==
The City of Struthers operates under a mayor-council statutory form of government as provided by the Ohio Constitution and the laws of the State of Ohio. As a statutory city, Struthers has home rule powers, but operates under a governmental structure prescribed by the state of Ohio. The city has three branches of government: executive, legislative, and judicial.

The mayor is the chief executive officer of the city charged with executing the laws of the state and ordinances passed by city council as well as overseeing the operations and affairs of the city in conjunction with the various department heads. The mayor is also the appointing authority for the city and, with the Director of Public Service and Safety, constitute the Board of Control. The mayor also has power to veto actions of the City Council.

The City Council is the legislative branch of city government responsible for considering and passing ordinances within its constitutional authority. The Council consists of seven members, four elected from wards and three elected at-large. All council positions are elected for two-year terms. All proposed legislation must receive a majority vote by City Council and be signed by the mayor to be enacted. Should the mayor veto the legislation, a two-thirds (5) votes of council is needed to override the mayor's veto.

The Municipal Court constitutes the judicial branch of city government. The head of the judicial branch is the judge, who is elected to a six-year term of office. The Municipal Court's jurisdiction is to handle all civil cases where the disputed amount is up to $15,000, criminal misdemeanors, and preliminary hearings for felony crimes committed in the geographic area of the court's authority which includes Struthers, Poland Village, Poland Township, New Middletown, Springfield Township, Lowellville, and a portion of the turnpike.

The electorate (voting age population) in the city is approximately 9,000. In a presidential election year, only about 5,000 votes at best are cast in the general election, and in primary and general elections for municipal offices, the number is considerably less. Struthers is predominately Democrat and, most often, the primary election is the most important election for selecting officeholders since they are often unopposed in the general election.

== Education ==
Children in Struthers are served by the public Struthers City School District, which includes one elementary school, one middle school, and Struthers High School. Struthers is served by a branch of the Public Library of Youngstown and Mahoning County.

== Media ==
Struthers is served by the Hometown Journal, a local weekly newspaper. It also has a local radio station, WKTL 90.7 FM, that is located at Struthers High School in the Struthers Fieldhouse.

== Notable people ==
- Joe Begala, college football and collegiate wrestling coach at Kent State University
- Steve Belichick, professional football player in the National Football League, college football head coach
- William H. Calbreath, claimed to have been the model for the Cream of Wheat trademark
- John Gerak, professional football player in the National Football League
- Bob James, rock singer-songwriter best known for his work with the band Montrose
- Paul Jenkins, abstract artist
- Andy Kosco, professional baseball player in Major League Baseball
- Mildred Joanne Smith, film actress and educator
