= The Fudge =

Rock band

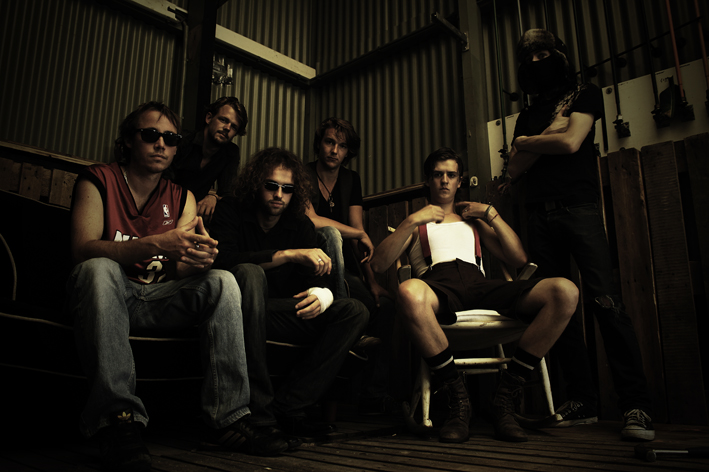
- The Fudge photoshoot in 2011

Background information
- Origin: Amsterdam, Netherlands
- Genres: Magnetic Rock, indie rock, psychedelic rock
- Years active: 2009–2013
- Label: Suburban Records
- Past members: Midas Treub; Ruben van Wiggen; Max Westendorp; Darius Timmer; Shawn Moorhead; Florent de Jong; Timothy Dunn
- Website: thefudgeband.com

The Fudge is a Dutch rock band formed in 2009 in Amsterdam by vocalist Midas Treub, guitarists Ruben van Wiggen and Max Westendorp, keyboardist Darius Timmer, bassist Shawn Moorhead and drummer Florent de Jong. In 2011 they have released their first single 'Too busy being Delicious' followed by the release of their first album Morning Comes Again.

== Biography ==
=== Early years ===
The Fudge formed in 2009. During the very first session the band explored each other's preferences and it turned out that each member had his own musical influences. The Fudge immediately knew that their diversity could be one of their main powers. A powerful and danceable sound in which Rock, Balkan, Folk, Pop, Ska and Psychedelic are all morphed together in one. They dubbed it Magnetic Rock: loud, tight, and great to dance to. In their first year they played over 50 times in the Netherlands and they toured twice in Germany. In a short period the band accumulated quite a lot of prize money to record their debut album. They won the MakeMoreMusic competition, were selected to play on the prestigious Queens-night festival in The Hague and won the people's choice award at the 'Grote Prijs van Nederland' competition where they also finished 2nd.

=== Morning Comes Again ===
October 2011 saw the release of the Fudge first studio album titled Morning Comes Again. The album was one year in the making and was recorded in Amsterdam. The band started the recording of their debut album with Jonas Filterborg (Relax, Beef) who produced the record. The record is mastered by Brad Blackwood (Black Eyed Peas, Maroon 5). On 5 October the Fudge presented their debut album in a sold out Paradiso venue.

=== Line-up change and breakup ===
In 2012 keyboardist Darius Timmer and bassist Shawn Moorhead left the band. Moorhead was replaced by Timothy Dunn, but the band could not find anyone to replace Timmer. At the end of the year the band started working on their second studio album, and released the single 'Moviestar'.

In March 2013 they announced they would "go our separate ways for the time being". Vocalist Midas Treub started a solo career.

== Line-up ==
- Midas Treub – lead vocals, guitar (2009–2013)
- Max Westendorp – guitar, vocals (2009–2013)
- Ruben van Wiggen – guitar, backing vocals (2009–2013)
- Timothy Dunn – bass, backing vocals (2012–2013)
- Florent de Jong – drums, backing vocals (2009–2013)

=== Previous members ===
- Darius Timmer – keys, backing vocals (2009–2012)
- Shawn Moorhead – bass (2009–2012)

== Discography ==
- Too Busy Being Delicious (2011)
- Morning Comes Again (2011)
- Movie Star (2012)
