= Fudge (TV series) =

1995 American television series

- Genre: Sitcom
- Based on: Fudge-a-Mania by Judy Blume
- Directed by: Bob Clark (pilot); Anson Williams (10 eps); Kristoffer Tabori (5 eps); Frank Bonner (1 ep)
- Starring: Jake Richardson; Eve Plumb; Forrest Witt; Nassira Nicola; Alex Burrall; Luke Tarsitano
- Country of origin: United States
- Original language: English
- No. of seasons: 2
- No. of episodes: 24

Production
- Executive producers: Mary Gregory de Butts; Russell Marcus
- Producer: Kevin C. Slattery
- Cinematography: Stephen C. Confer
- Editors: Nancy Forner; David Helfand
- Running time: 19–20 minutes
- Production companies: Kevin Slattery Productions; Amblin Television; MCA Television Entertainment

Original release
- Network: ABC
- Release: January 14 – December 16, 1995

Fudge is a 1995 American children's television series based on a series of Judy Blume novels about a young boy nicknamed Fudge. The series ran for two seasons, with 24 episodes following a telefilm adaptation of Blume's novel Fudge-a-Mania, which aired on January 7, 1995, in primetime, as part of the ABC Family Movies.

The show was canceled after the second season as part of ABC's restructuring of its Saturday morning lineup due to the network's 1996 acquisition by The Walt Disney Company.

== Broadcasts ==
=== U.S. network broadcasts ===
Fudge premiered on ABC's Saturday morning program block on January 14, 1995, one week after the pilot movie aired, and ran nine episodes for its first season, and aired its second season with 15 episodes from August to December 1995, with reruns continuing until September 1996. ABC's broadcasts of the show were often accompanied with a Schoolhouse Rock segment immediately after the end of each episode.

In September 1997, reruns of the show reappeared on the CBS Saturday morning lineup, where it remained until December of that year.

=== International broadcasts ===
In Canada, the show was broadcast on YTV at the time of the show's original run. The program was also broadcast in the United Kingdom on BBC as part of its CBBC lineup from April 1996 until November 1999. In addition, Australia's Network Ten also broadcast the show as part of its children's programming lineup in 1996.

== Cast ==
=== Primary cast ===
- Jake Richardson as Peter Warren Hatcher (storyteller)
- Luke Tarsitano as Farley Drexel "Fudge" Hatcher
- Eve Plumb as Anne Hatcher ("Mom")
- Forrest Witt as Warren Hatcher ("Dad")
- Nassira Nicola as Sheila Tubman
- Alex Burrall as Jimmy Fargo

=== Other characters ===
- Rob Monroe as Henry Bevelheimer
- Grant Hoover as Arnold
- Chuck Marra as Mr. Bogner
- Rif Hutton as Mr. Green
- Nick Humphrey as Elliot
- Brenda Song as Jennie
- Teddy Dale as Sam
- Jared Moen as Daniel Manheim

== Episodes ==
=== TV movie ===
Title	Directed by	Written by	Original release date
"Fudge-a-Mania"	Bob Clark	Bob Clark	January 7, 1995
The Hatchers and the Tubmans decide to go to Maine together for a few weeks in August. Peter and Sheila Tubman don't get along happily. His friend Jimmy Fargo comes to help brighten it. While in Maine, the families have many encounters including a baseball game with Red Sox center fielder Big Apfel (Alex Karras), a sailing trip, and a surprise from Peter's grandmother, Muriel (Florence Henderson), and Sheila's grandfather, Buzzy Senior (Darren McGavin).

=== Season 1 (January–March 1995) ===
No. overall	No. in season	Title	Directed by	Written by	Original release date
1	1	"How Turtle Got His Name"	Anson Williams	Teleplay by : Mary Gregory de Butts & Russell Marcus	January 14, 1995
Peter reveals the story of how he got his dog, Turtle: He won a little turtle at a birthday party; he named it Dribble. Fudge ate the turtle when he wanted to make his own turtle soup following a soup dinner with Peter's dad Warren's advertising client. When Fudge went to the hospital and then brought home, Warren and Anne got him a puppy and to keep the memory of Dribble (since he died in Fudge's stomach), he named the puppy Turtle.
2	2	"Saving Up Is Hard to Do"	Anson Williams	Tom J. Astle	January 21, 1995
With their parents' wedding anniversary coming in short order, Peter hopes to find a good gift for them on a budget, and hopes that they like the gift he gives them. Meanwhile, Fudge becomes an elevator attendant to earn money for an anniversary gift, much to Peter's chagrin.
3	3	"Fudge Meets Ratface"	Lynn Hamrick	Teleplay by : Mary Gregory de Butts & Russell Marcus	January 28, 1995
At the end of summer vacation, Peter dreads the idea of Fudge attending the same school as him. On Fudge's first day of kindergarten, he climbed up to the top of a shelf and won't come down because his teacher, unlike his friends and family, wouldn't call him Fudge. Peter gets the idea of transferring Fudge to another class so that the other teacher will call him Fudge.
4	4	"The TV Star"	Anson Williams	Teleplay by : Mary Gregory de Butts & Russell Marcus	February 4, 1995
When Peter and Fudge spends a day at his father's office, Fudge unwittingly ends up becoming the star of a new tricycle commercial.
5	5	"To Catch a Fudge"	Kristoffer Tabori	George Thompson	February 11, 1995
Sheila is in for a challenge when she volunteers to babysit Fudge while his parents have dinner with Sheila's parents at their apartment. Chaos ensues when Fudge plays a hiding game.
6	6	"The Birthday Bash"	Iris Dugow	Teleplay by : Tom J. Astle	February 18, 1995
On Fudge's birthday, which happened to land on a Saturday, Peter is forced to stay home and celebrate at his brother's birthday party. In the end, Fudge didn't care that his friends came, all he wanted was for his big brother to be there on his birthday.
7	7	"The Flying Train Committee"	Lynn Hamrick	Teleplay by : Mary Gregory de Butts & Russell Marcus	February 25, 1995
Peter, Jimmy and Sheila are working on a school project about transportation in the city, which results in several arguments. But right before the project was due, Fudge vandalizes the poster associated with the project, which prompts his parents to build a wall separating them.
8	8	"Uncle Feather"	Lynn Hamrick	Teleplay by : Mary Gregory de Butts & Russell Marcus	March 4, 1995
Shortly after a wall was built in the previous episode to give the two boys some space, Fudge struggles to fall asleep due to his fear of monsters in his room. To prevent the wall from being taken down in their room, Peter's solution was to let Fudge have a pet bird.
9	9	"Ducky Soup"	Kristoffer Tabori	Robin J. Stein	March 11, 1995
Fudge's favorite stuffed monkey named Rumpy is thrown in the wash by accident. Peter gives him his stuffed duck in an attempt to temporarily replace it until the stuffed monkey is poorly sewn back together.

=== Season 2 (August–December 1995) ===
No. overall	No. in season	Title	Directed by	Written by	Original release date
10	1	"The Grade Escape"	Anson Williams	Tom J. Astle	August 19, 1995
Peter is ill and is to complete a take-home aptitude test, which Sheila brings him in duplicate. Peter completes the test on one copy, while the other is filled out and unwittingly aced by Fudge, which results in the latter getting the highest score by accidentally handing in the one filled out by Fudge. As a result, Peter must find a way to prove that Fudge's intelligence is false or face humiliation.
11	2	"The Art of Friendship"	Anson Williams	Jay Ingram	August 26, 1995
Peter's friendship with Jimmy Fargo is in serious jeopardy in the wake of an announced appearance by Jimmy's father as a speaker on Career Day at school. Special guest star: Michael Colyar as Frank Fargo.
12	3	"No Exit"	Anson Williams	Mary Gregory deButts	September 2, 1995
Relatives come to visit, and Peter gets the younger-sibling experience when he and Fudge are babysat by their older cousin, while the adults are out to dinner at a steakhouse, much to Anne and Warren's disgust. Note: Anson Williams guest stars as the waiter.
13	4	"Play It Again, Dad"	Anson Williams	Tom J. Astle	September 9, 1995
After seeing a performance by a street performer, a girl winking at Peter prompts him to dream about becoming a music star. In response, Warren enrolls Peter for piano lessons. Special guest star: Milton Berle as Leo.
14	5	"The Candyman Shouldn't"	Anson Williams	Mary Gregory de Butts	September 16, 1995
A routine dental checkup reveals Fudge has four cavities. As a result, Anne and Warren challenges the whole family to give up sugary snacks and desserts for a week, much to the dismay of Fudge and Peter.
15	6	"My Grandmother the Card"	Iris Dugow	Tom J. Astle	September 23, 1995
Peter and Fudge's grandmother comes to babysit them when Anne and Warren go away for the weekend. However, grandmother's plans conflict with Peter's and his friends' intentions.
16	7	"Big Little Lie"	Kristoffer Tabori	George Thompson	September 30, 1995
Peter and Fudge's wrestling results in one of the legs of a table becoming broken. In order to conceal the truth to avoid punishment, Peter enlists Arnold and (unintentionally) Sheila to fix the table before their parents come home from their outing.
17	8	"Bye Anxiety"	Anson Williams	Joseph Purdy	October 7, 1995
Peter's relationship with Sheila comes into question when her family makes an announcement that they may be relocating to Chicago.
18	9	"Bad Housekeeping"	Frank Bonner	Tom J. Astle	October 14, 1995
When their parents ponder the idea of hiring a housekeeper due to the family's bad household habits, Fudge and Peter fear that their belongings will be clean out of sight. Warren goes overboard when he tries to clean up the house himself.
19	10	"Odd Man Out"	Anson Williams	Lisa Stotsky	October 21, 1995
Peter's class takes part in a multi-day Kindergarten buddies program.
20	11	"A Foreign Affair"	Allison Liddi	Kent Pierce	October 28, 1995
Peter has a crush on a new female student from China.
21	12	"Slam Funk"	Kristoffer Tabori	Allison M. Gibson	November 4, 1995
A new boy interferes with the friendship of Peter and Jimmy.
22	13	"Reversal of Fortune"	Allison Liddi	Kent Pierce and Allison M. Gibson	November 11, 1995
23	14	"The Mouse Trappers"	Anson Williams	Mary Gregory de Butts & Russell Marcus & Tom J. Astle	November 18, 1995
When they look to add another room to their apartment, Peter gets a notion that their parents are thinking of having another baby. Meanwhile, Fudge befriends a mouse.
24	15	"Midnight Cowboys"	Kristoffer Tabori	Mary Gregory de Butts	December 16, 1995
The Hatchers host a New Year's party, during which Peter tries his best to get Fudge into bed at the regularly scheduled time.

== Reception ==
TV Guide twice listed Fudge as one of the Ten Best Shows for Children.

=== Awards and nominations ===
At the Seventeenth Annual Youth in Film Awards, the cast was nominated for a Young Actors Award, Best Performance by a Young Ensemble: Television. Nassira Nicola, who played Sheila Tubman, won for Best Performance by a Young Actress: TV Comedy Series.

== Home video ==
The made-for-TV pilot movie and select episodes were released on VHS by GoodTimes Home Video under license by MCA Universal Home Video in early 1996.
