= Luke Tarsitano =

American television actor (born 1990)

- Born: March 18, 1990 (age 36)
- Years active: 1995–present

Luke Tarsitano (born March 18, 1990) is an American television actor. He played the character of Fudge in the series of that name and had guest appearances on Frasier, Suddenly Susan and on The Tonight Show with Jay Leno. During one of these visits, Leno asked if it was true that Tarsitano had seen a UFO. "I did not see a UFO," replied Tarsitano. "I saw an alien spaceship." He also pitched a movie to Jay, the plot of which revolved around Tarsitano being the reincarnation of John Wayne.

In 1997, he was a regular on the short-lived series Over the Top, as impish youngster Daniel Martin, who affectionately gave grief to cynical grownup Simon Ferguson, played by Tim Curry.

Tarsitano has played Secret Service #1 in the 2011 short film Counterfeiters and has also played Referee in the 2011 short film Baer.

Tarsitano also starred with Courtney Bradley in director Joelle Silverman's film Existential.

== Awards ==
- 1997 Young Artist Award Best Performance by a Young Actor in a Saturday Morning TV Program for Fudge.
