= Double Fudge =

2002 children's novel by Judy Blume

- First edition
- Author: Judy Blume
- Language: English
- Series: Fudge series
- Genre: Children's novel
- Published: 2002
- Publisher: Dutton
- Publication place: United States
- Media type: Print (Paperback)
- Pages: 213
- ISBN: 0-525-46926-5
- OCLC: 49664589
- LC Class: PZ7.B6265 Do 2002
- Preceded by: Fudge-A-Mania

Double Fudge is a 2002 children's novel by Judy Blume and the fifth and final entry in the Fudge series. The Hatcher family goes to Washington, D.C. where they spend time with their extended family, and Fudge finds out that his cousin is also named Farley Drexel Hatcher. His interest in money is a common theme throughout the story.

== Plot ==
As the story begins, Fudge, who is still five years old, develops an obsessive and greedy love for money, irritating his twelve-year-old brother, Peter, to no end. After some discussion, the family decides to take him to the Bureau of Engraving and Printing in Washington, D.C. for a long weekend to show how money is made, hoping that his obsession will stop there.

That plan backfires when instead, the family unexpectedly meets up with their long-lost cousins, who also have the last name of Hatcher (but who, for the purposes of the story, are known as the Howie Hatchers): Howie, a park ranger who resides in Hawaii and is traveling the country, his pregnant wife, Eudora, their perfect, slightly overindulged twelve-year-old identical twin daughters Flora and Fauna (who are sometimes nicknamed the "Natural Beauties" and "Heavenly Hatchers") and three-year-old Farley Drexel Hatcher, which is also Fudge's real name. Peter dubs him "Mini", and the nickname sticks. The Hatchers find themselves stuck with their cousins, who invite themselves to move in with them for weeks in their Upper West Side apartment.

Peter is also having a rough time throughout the story because his best friend, Jimmy Fargo, has left the Upper West Side and moved "far off" to SoHo on the other side of Manhattan, although they still get to go to the same school, where they are both in the seventh grade, while Fudge is in the "Mixed" group, along with his new friend, Melissa Beth Miller.

Near the end of the story, in a semi-homage to the ending of the first novel, Mini swallows Fudge's baby tooth that just fell out, making money-obsessed Fudge furious because he was planning to get a dollar for it from the tooth fairy.

After the Howie Hatchers finally leave, Fudge throws a temper tantrum over what Mini did, saying he hated him. This leads to Peter telling Fudge that he felt the same way when Fudge swallowed his pet turtle, Dribble, in Tales of a Fourth Grade Nothing. Genuinely surprised at this news, Fudge thinks about this and finally realizes that he hasn't been a very good brother after all.

== Publication history ==
Double Fudge was first published by Dutton in September 2002. An audiobook was released by Listening Library the same year, narrated by Blume.

== Reception ==
Publishers Weekly gave the book a positive review, stating that fans of the previous books in the series will welcome it, and describing it as a cheerful read. Conversely, Kirkus Reviews gave it a negative review, describing it as being too busy and "surprisingly unfunny".
