= Slam book =

Notebook that is passed among children and teens for anonymous remarks

A slam book is a notebook (commonly the spiral-bound type) that is passed among children and teenagers. The keeper of the book starts by posting a question, which is then passed around for other contributors to fill in their own answers to the question.

Slam books were also a source of bullying between students—where students "lived in fear" of the "biting comments" written anonymously under their names, "on the order of what today might be a Tweet or a Facebook comment". A slam book containing cruel comments was featured in episode 3.20 ("Kids Can Be Cruel") of the 1980s TV show Facts of Life.

One early reference to slam books can be found in the November 18, 1928 issue of The Central New Jersey Home News where it was reported as a new fad among New Brunswick high school students. It was defined in The Vocabulary of Jazzdom in 1922 as "a diary in which you 'knock' your friends".

One newspaper article from 1930 argued that slam books could be a great thing for humanity. "Psychology, industry, and the ghastly exposure to the late war have changed [the Victorian era's faux veneer of sentimentality and taboos]. We have learned the price of sentimentality. The youngsters of today are facing life and themselves as is."

In general, however, slam books were seen in a negative light. A slam book was briefly the focus of the murder investigation of Carole Lee Kensinger in 1948.

Slam books crossed racial barriers and were popular among African American high school communities in the 1950s. and were not limited to the US. In 2005, friends created a slam book as a going-away present for 16-year-old Richa Thapa who emigrated from Nepal to the US. In 1999, Claire Morris-Dobbie launched SLAM: A New Way to Tell the Truth, a pre-made "slam book" with online tie-in features in an attempt to combine nostalgia with the growing World Wide Web. It was billed as a "kinder and gentler" slam book for teens and pre-teens with the goal of encouraging them to think and communicate, write and express themselves.

Slam books can also exist in virtual formats. Web-based slam book sites have attracted controversy for hosting virtual slam books in which individuals or organizations are targeted for criticism that constitutes bullying or defamation.

Some point to slam books as the analog precursor to anonymous trolling and negative social interactions on Twitter and Facebook. "Passing handwritten notes or 'slam books' has since been replaced with online tools such as IM, websites, blogs, cell phones, etc."
