= 48th Golden Globe Awards =

Film award ceremony in 1991

- Date: January 19, 1991
- Site: Beverly Hilton Hotel, Beverly Hills, California, USA
- Hosted by: Dana Delany; Steve Guttenberg

Highlights
- Best Film: Drama: Dances With Wolves
- Best Film: Musical or Comedy: Green Card
- Best Drama Series: Twin Peaks
- Best Musical or Comedy Series: Cheers
- Most awards: (3) Dances with Wolves; Twin Peaks; Cheers
- Most nominations: (7) The Godfather Part III

Television coverage
- Network: TBS SuperStation

The 48th Golden Globe Awards, honoring the best in film and television for 1990, were held on January 19, 1991, at the Beverly Hilton. The nominations were announced on December 27, 1990.

== Winners and nominees ==
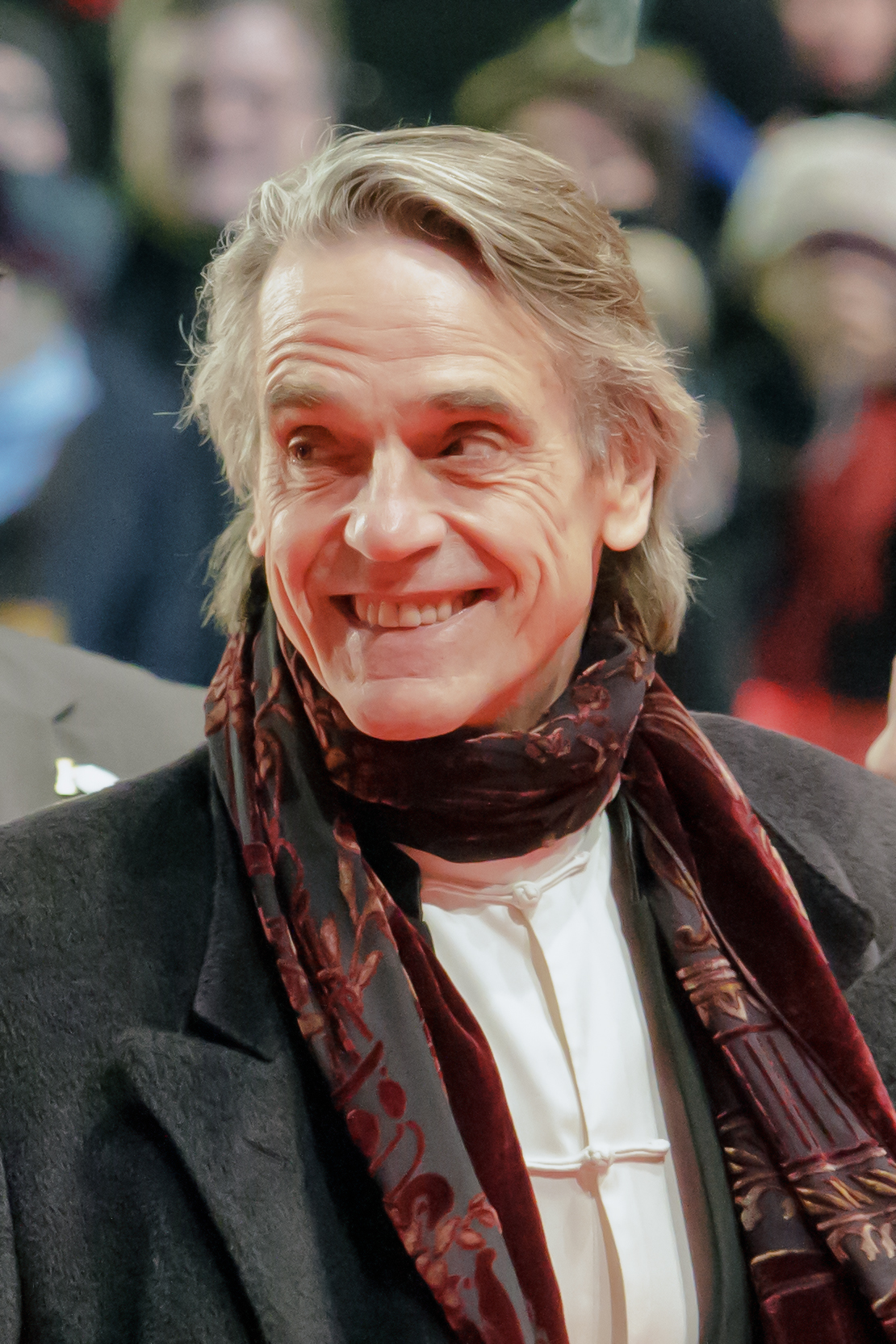
Jeremy Irons — Best Actor in a Motion Picture, Drama winner

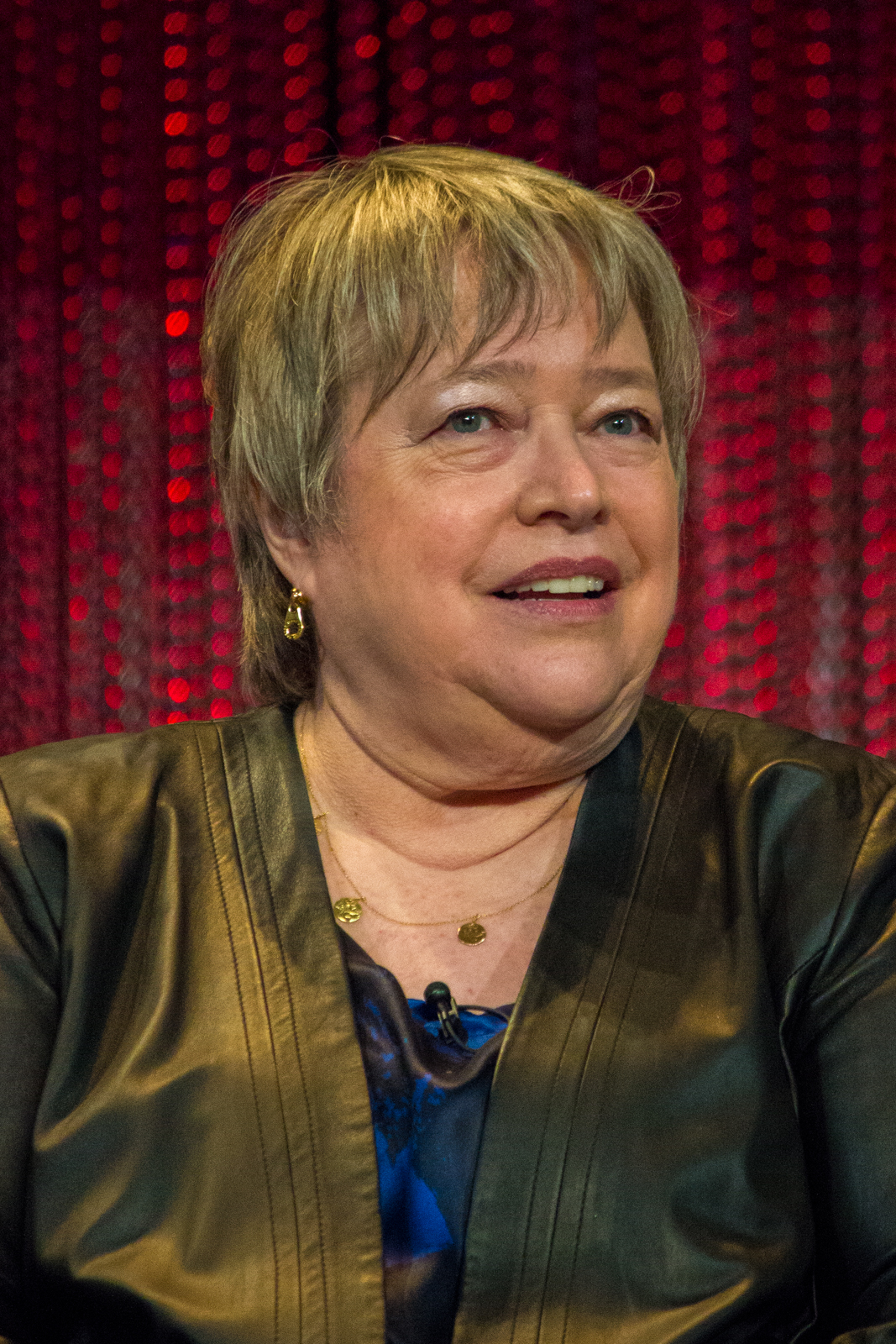
Kathy Bates — Best Actress in a Motion Picture, Drama winner

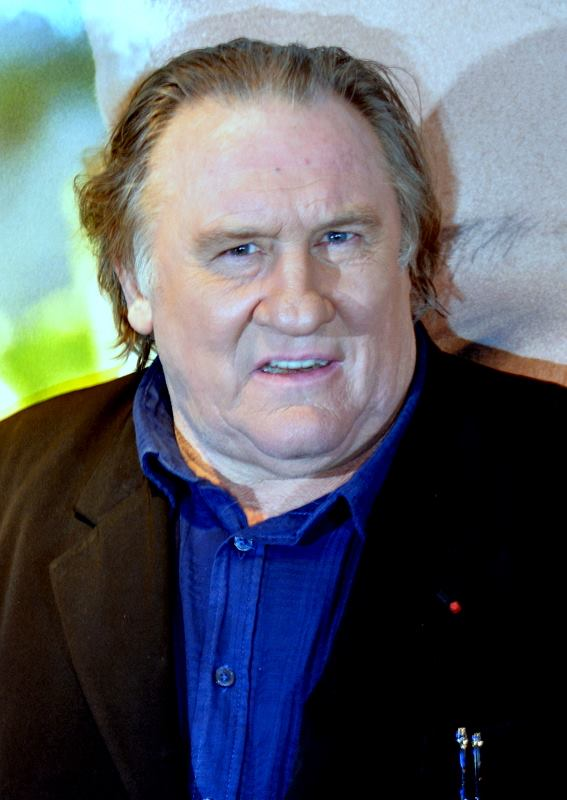
Gérard Depardieu — Best Actor in a Motion Picture, Musical or Comedy winner

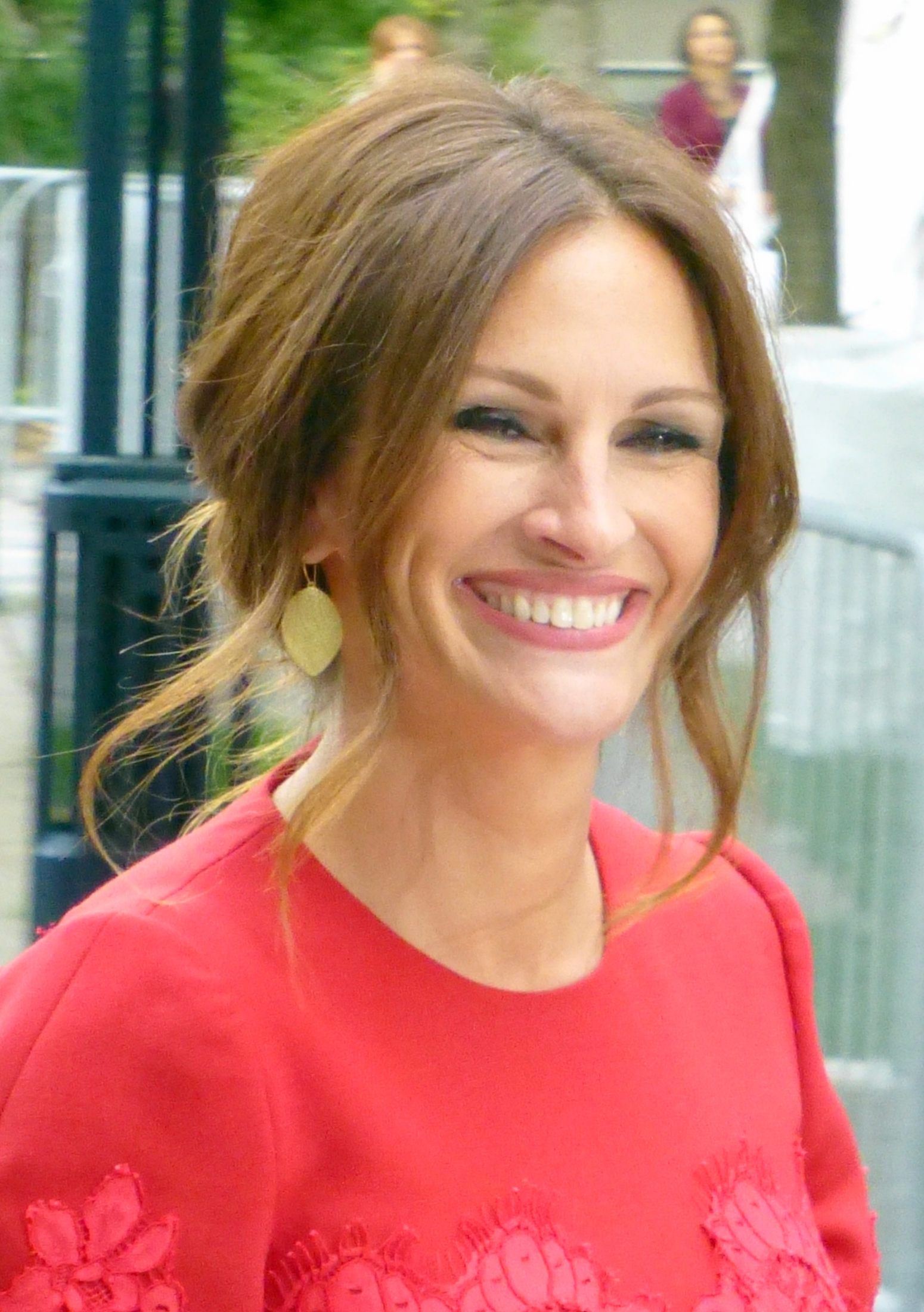
Julia Roberts — Best Actress in a Motion Picture, Musical or Comedy winner

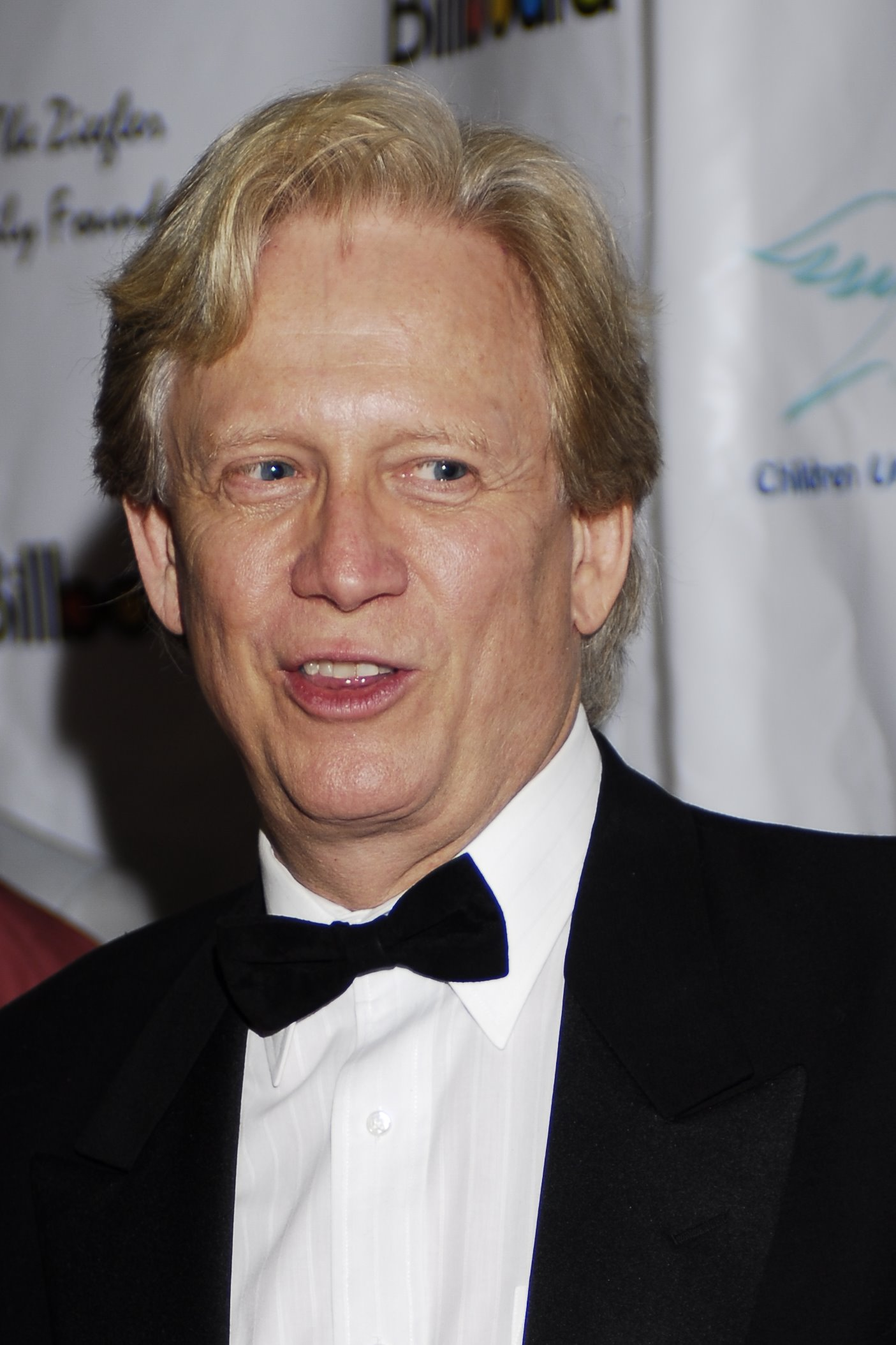
Bruce Davison — Best Supporting Actor in a Motion Picture – Drama, Musical or Comedy winner

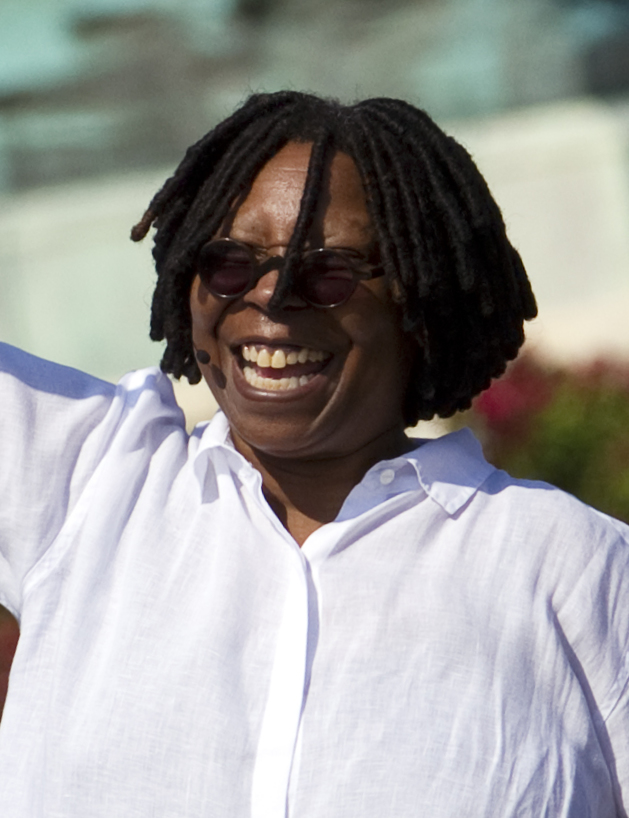
Whoopi Goldberg — Best Supporting Actress in a Motion Picture – Drama, Musical or Comedy winner

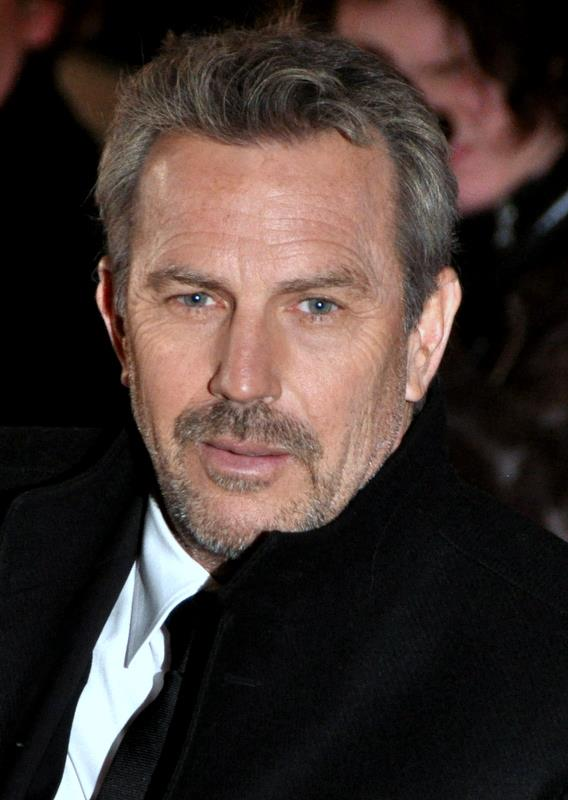
Kevin Costner — Best Director winner

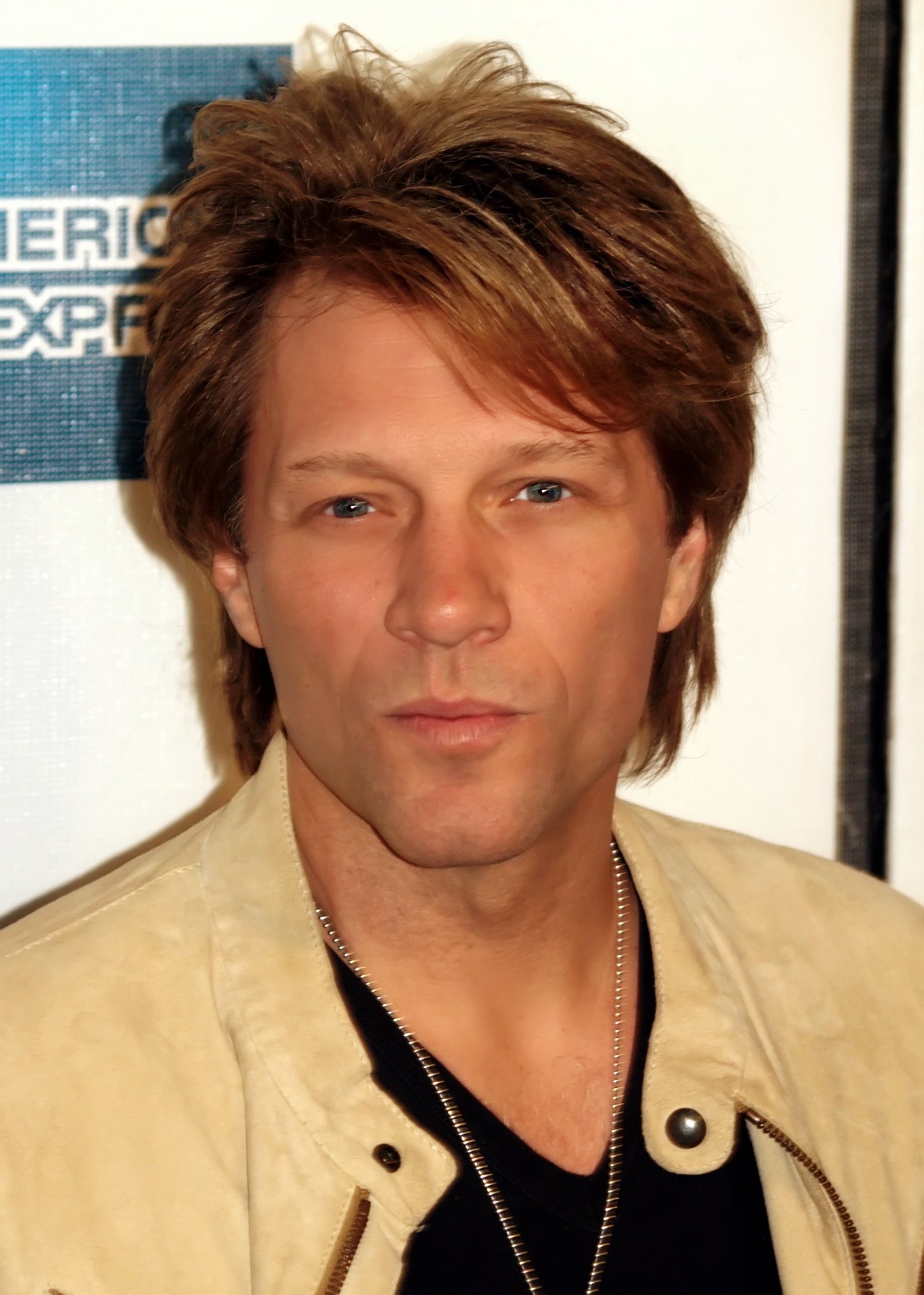
Jon Bon Jovi — Best Original Song for "Blaze of Glory" winner

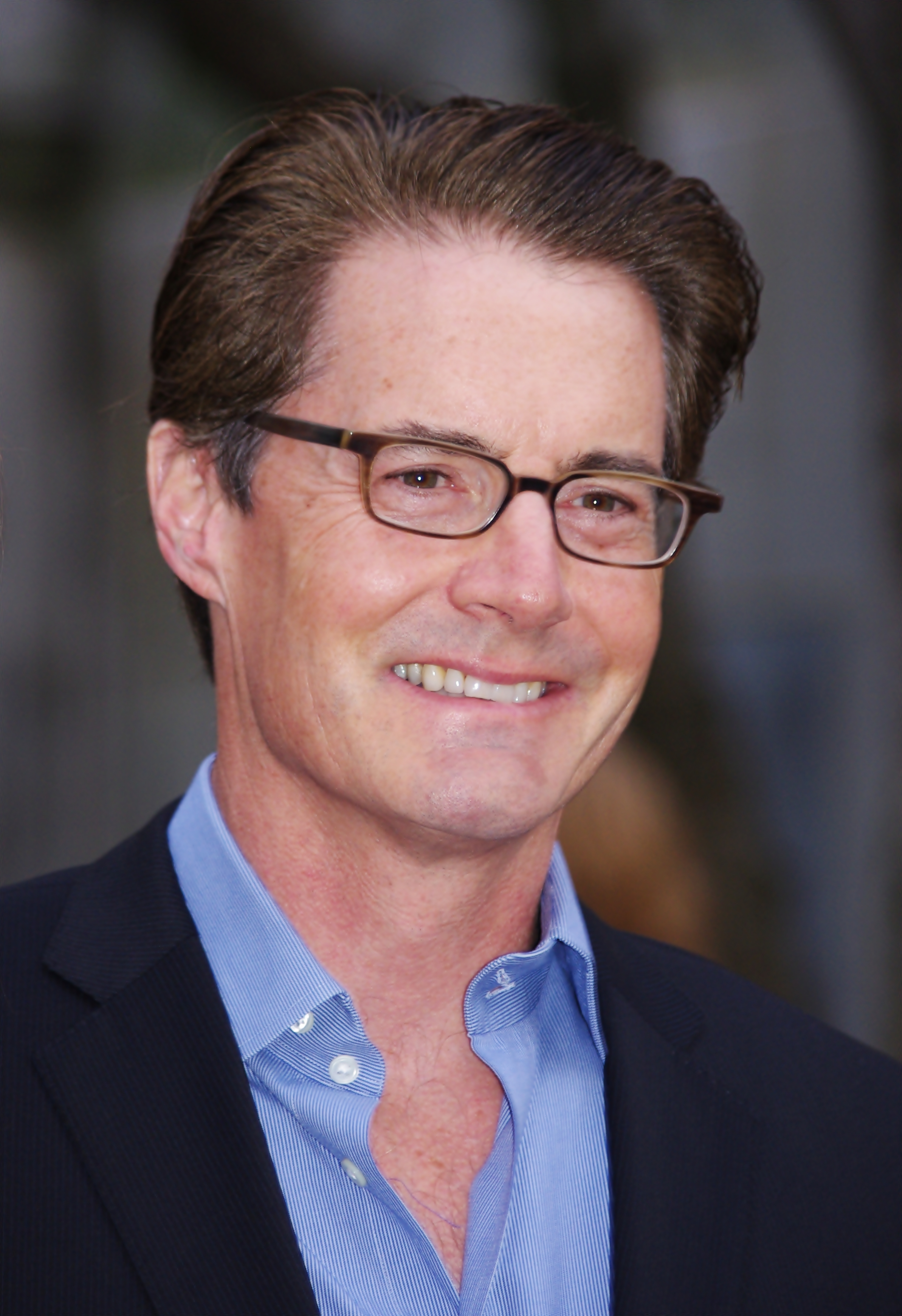
Kyle MacLachlan — Best Actor in a Series, Drama winner

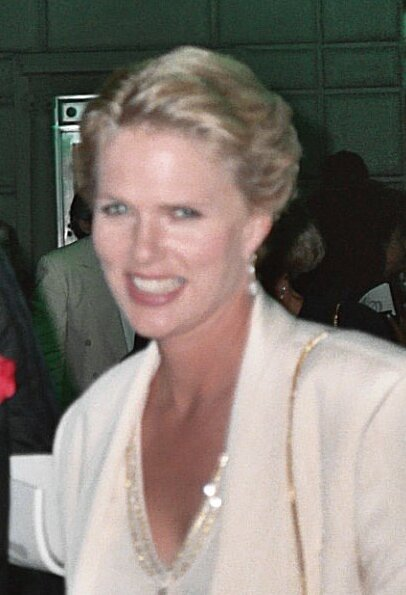
Sharon Gless — Best Actress in a Series, Drama winner

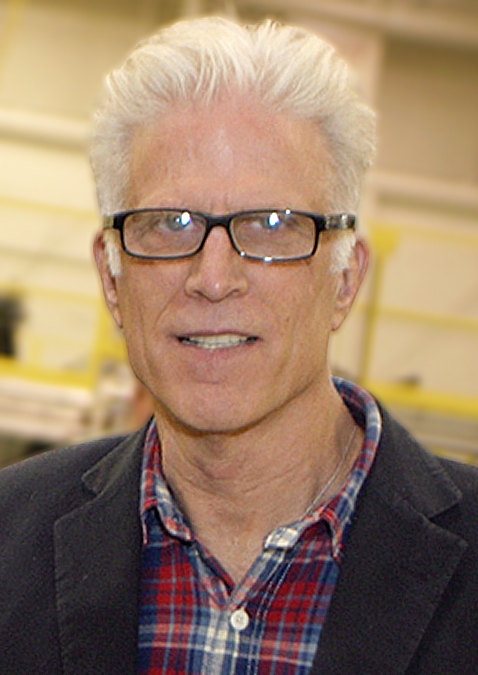
Ted Danson — Best Actor in a Series, Musical or Comedy winner

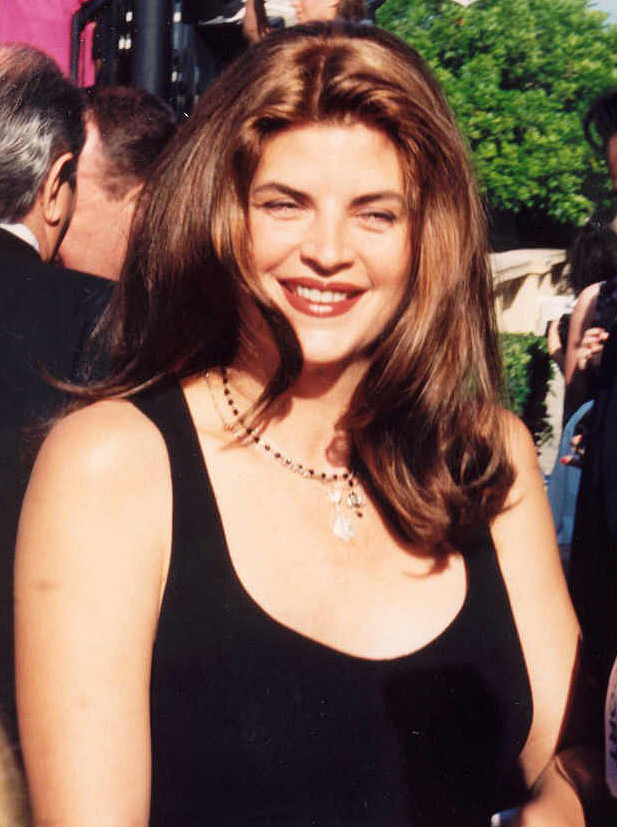
Kirstie Alley — Best Actress in a Series, Musical or Comedy winner

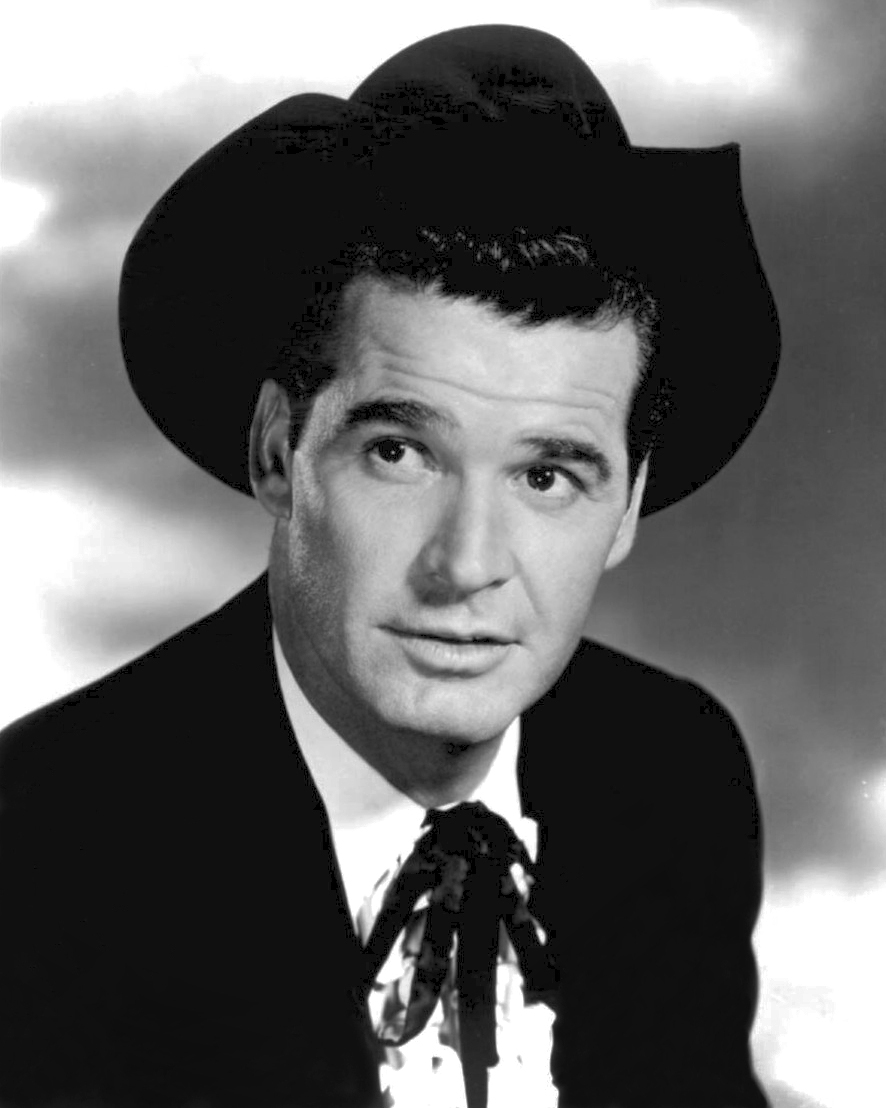
James Garner — Best Actor in a Miniseries or Television Film winner

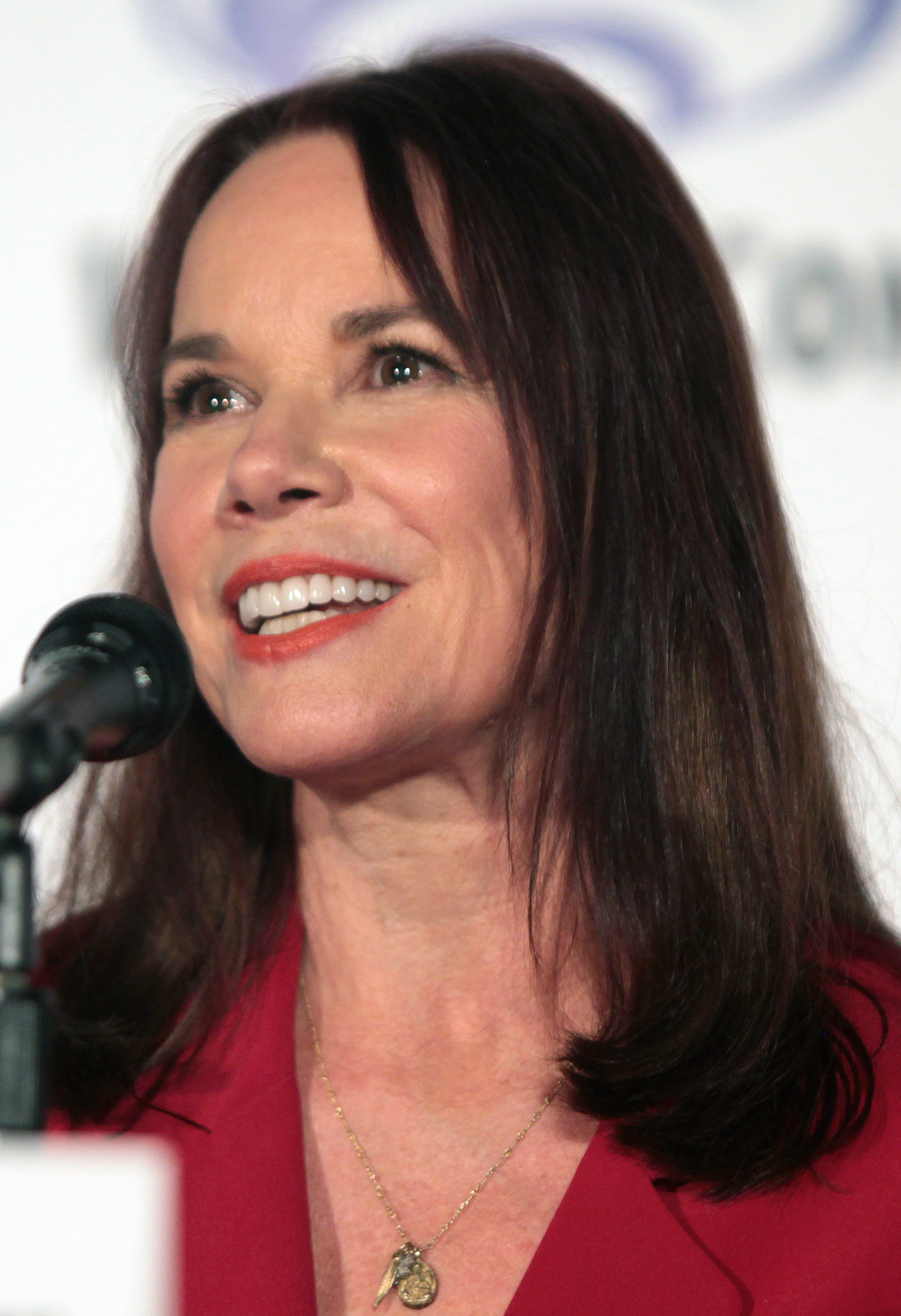
Barbara Hershey — Best Actress in a Miniseries or Television Film winner

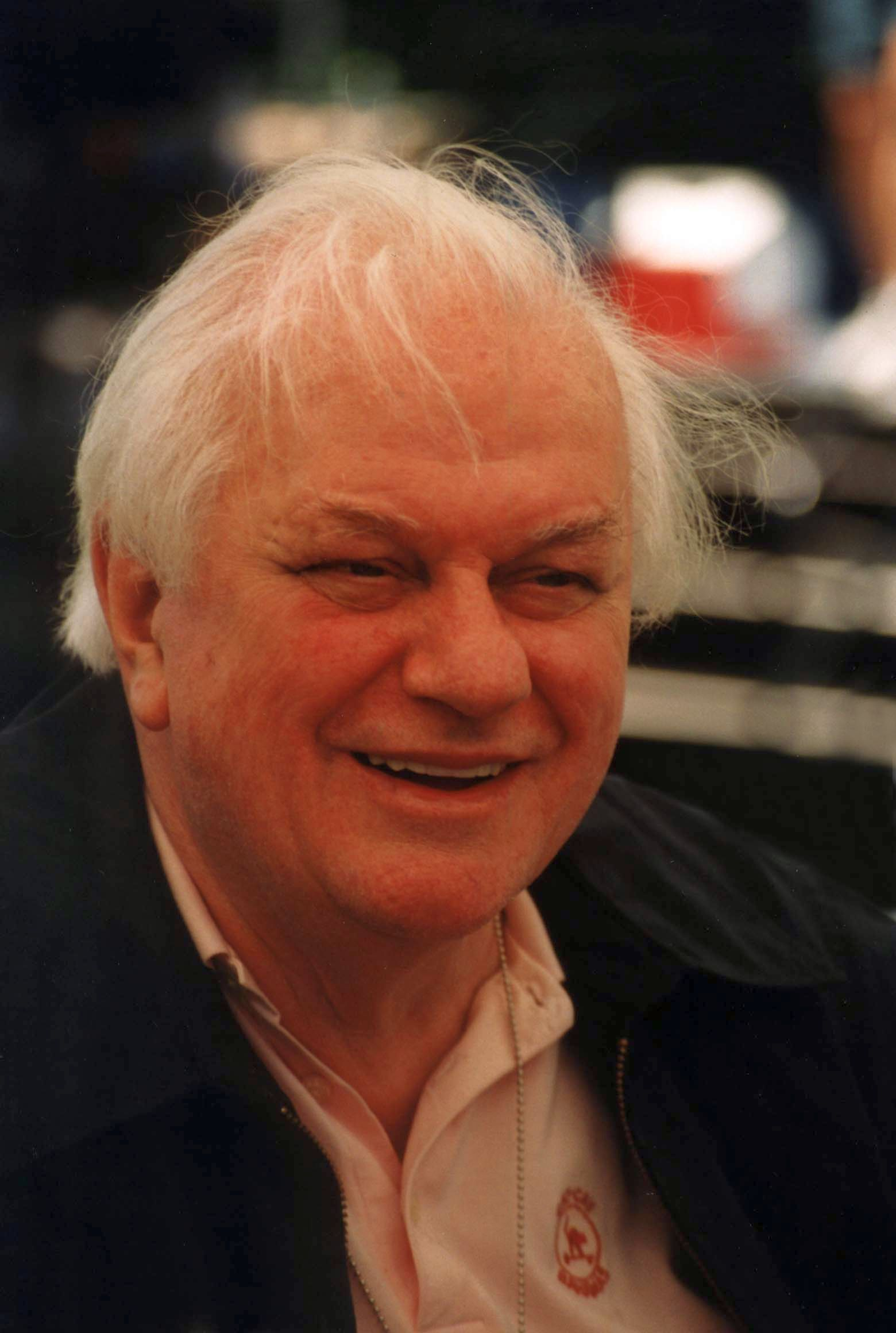
Charles Durning — Best Supporting Actor - Series, Miniseries or Television Film winner

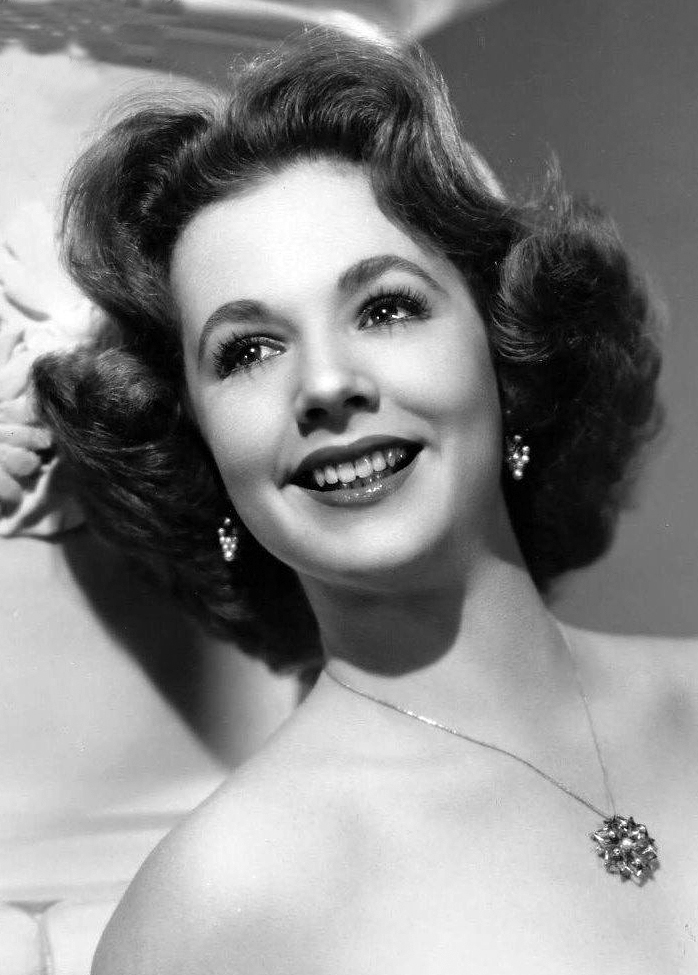
Piper Laurie — Best Supporting Actress - Series, Miniseries or Television Film winner

=== Film ===
Best Motion Picture
Drama	Musical or Comedy
Dances with Wolves; Avalon; The Godfather Part III; Goodfellas; Reversal of Fortune	Green Card; Dick Tracy; Ghost; Home Alone; Pretty Woman
Best Performance in a Motion Picture – Drama
Actor	Actress
Jeremy Irons – Reversal of Fortune as Claus von Bülow; Kevin Costner – Dances with Wolves as Lieutenant John J. Dunbar; Richard Harris – The Field as Bull McCabe; Al Pacino – The Godfather Part III as Michael Corleone; Robin Williams – Awakenings as Dr. Malcolm Sayer	Kathy Bates – Misery as Annie Wilkes; Anjelica Huston – The Grifters as Lilly Dillon; Michelle Pfeiffer – The Russia House as Katya Orlova; Susan Sarandon – White Palace as Nora Baker; Joanne Woodward – Mr. & Mrs. Bridge as India Bridge
Best Performance in a Motion Picture – Musical or Comedy
Actor	Actress
Gérard Depardieu – Green Card as Georges Fauré; Macaulay Culkin – Home Alone as Kevin McCallister; Johnny Depp – Edward Scissorhands as Edward; Richard Gere – Pretty Woman as Edward Lewis; Patrick Swayze – Ghost as Sam Wheat	Julia Roberts – Pretty Woman as Vivian Ward; Mia Farrow – Alice as Alice Tate; Andie MacDowell – Green Card as Brontë Parrish; Demi Moore – Ghost as Molly Jensen; Meryl Streep – Postcards from the Edge as Suzanne Vale
Best Supporting Performance in a Motion Picture – Drama, Musical or Comedy
Supporting Actor	Supporting Actress
Bruce Davison – Longtime Companion as David; Armand Assante – Q & A as Roberto "Bobby Tex" Texador; Hector Elizondo – Pretty Woman as Barney Thompson; Andy García – The Godfather Part III as Vincent Corleone; Al Pacino – Dick Tracy as Alphonse "Big Boy" Caprice; Joe Pesci – Goodfellas as Tommy DeVito	Whoopi Goldberg – Ghost as Oda Mae Brown; Lorraine Bracco – Goodfellas as Karen Friedman Hill; Diane Ladd – Wild at Heart as Marietta Fortune; Shirley MacLaine – Postcards from the Edge as Doris Mann; Mary McDonnell – Dances with Wolves as Stands with a Fist; Winona Ryder – Mermaids as Charlotte Flax
Other
Best Director	Best Screenplay
Kevin Costner – Dances with Wolves; Bernardo Bertolucci – The Sheltering Sky; Francis Ford Coppola – The Godfather Part III; Barbet Schroeder – Reversal of Fortune; Martin Scorsese – Goodfellas	Dances with Wolves – Michael Blake; Avalon – Barry Levinson; The Godfather Part III – Francis Ford Coppola and Mario Puzo; Goodfellas – Nicholas Pileggi and Martin Scorsese; Reversal of Fortune – Nicholas Kazan
Best Original Score	Best Original Song
The Sheltering Sky – Ryuichi Sakamoto and Richard Horowitz; Avalon – Randy Newman; Dances with Wolves – John Barry; The Godfather Part III – Carmine Coppola; Havana – Dave Grusin	"Blaze of Glory" performed by Jon Bon Jovi – Young Guns II; "Sooner or Later (I Always Get My Man)" performed by Madonna – Dick Tracy; "What Can You Lose?" performed by Madonna and Mandy Patinkin – Dick Tracy; "Promise Me You'll Remember" performed by Harry Connick, Jr. – The Godfather Part III; "I'm Checkin' Out" performed by Meryl Streep and Blue Rodeo – Postcards from the Edge
Best Foreign Language Film
Cyrano de Bergerac (France); Dreams (Japan); The Nasty Girl (Das Schreckliche Mädchen) (West Germany); Requiem for Dominic (Requiem für Dominik) (Austria); Taxi Blues (Taksi-Blyuz) (USSR)

The following films received multiple nominations:

Nominations	Title
7	The Godfather Part III
6	Dances with Wolves
5	Goodfellas
4	Dick Tracy
4	Ghost
4	Pretty Woman
4	Reversal of Fortune
3	Avalon
3	Green Card
3	Postcards from the Edge
2	Home Alone
2	The Sheltering Sky

The following films received multiple wins:

Wins	Title
3	Dances with Wolves
2	Green Card

=== Television ===
Best Television Series
Drama	Musical or Comedy
Twin Peaks; China Beach; In the Heat of the Night; L.A. Law; thirtysomething	Cheers; Designing Women; The Golden Girls; Married... with Children; Murphy Brown
Best Performance in a Television Series – Drama
Actor	Actress
Kyle MacLachlan – Twin Peaks as Special Agent Dale Cooper; Scott Bakula – Quantum Leap as Dr. Samuel "Sam" Beckett; Peter Falk – Columbo as Columbo; James Earl Jones – Gabriel's Fire as Gabriel Bird; Carroll O'Connor – In the Heat of the Night as William O. "Bill" Gillespie	Sharon Gless – The Trials of Rosie O'Neill as Rosie O'Neill; Patricia Wettig – thirtysomething as Nancy Krieger Weston; Dana Delany – China Beach as First Lieutenant Colleen McMurphy; Susan Dey – L.A. Law as Grace Van Owen; Jill Eikenberry – L.A. Law as Ann Kelsey; Angela Lansbury – Murder, She Wrote as Jessica Fletcher
Best Performance in a Television Series – Musical or Comedy
Actor	Actress
Ted Danson – Cheers as Sam Malone; John Goodman – Roseanne as Dan Conner; Richard Mulligan – Empty Nest as Dr. Harry Weston; Burt Reynolds – Evening Shade as Wood Newton; Fred Savage – The Wonder Years as Kevin Arnold	Kirstie Alley – Cheers as Rebecca Howe; Candice Bergen – Murphy Brown as Murphy Brown; Carol Burnett – Carol & Company as various characters; Roseanne – Roseanne as Roseanne Conner; Katey Sagal – Married... with Children as Peggy Bundy
Best Performance in a Miniseries or Television Film
Actor	Actress
James Garner – Decoration Day as Albert Sidney Finch; Steven Bauer – Drug Wars: The Camarena Story as Enrique "Kiki" Camarena; Michael Caine – Jekyll & Hyde as Dr. Jekyll and Mr. Hyde; Tom Hulce – Murder in Mississippi as Michael Schwerner; Burt Lancaster – The Phantom of the Opera as Gerard Carriere; Rick Schroder – The Stranger Within as Mark	Barbara Hershey – A Killing in a Small Town as Candy Morrison; Suzanne Pleshette – Leona Helmsley: The Queen of Mean as Leona Helmsley; Annette O'Toole – The Kennedys of Massachusetts as Rose Kennedy; Lesley Ann Warren – Family of Spies as Barbara Walker; Stephanie Zimbalist – Caroline? as Caroline
Best Supporting Performance - Series, Miniseries or Television Film
Supporting Actor	Supporting Actress
Charles Durning – The Kennedys of Massachusetts as John F. Fitzgerald; Barry Miller – Equal Justice as Pete Brigman; Jimmy Smits – L.A. Law as Victor Sifuentes; Dean Stockwell – Quantum Leap as Al Calavicci; Blair Underwood – L.A. Law as Jonathan Rollins	Piper Laurie – Twin Peaks as Catherine Martell; Sherilyn Fenn – Twin Peaks as Audrey Horne; Faith Ford – Murphy Brown as Corky Sherwood; Marg Helgenberger – China Beach as Karen Charlene "K.C." Koloski; Park Overall – Empty Nest as Laverne Todd
Best Miniseries or Television Film
Decoration Day; Caroline?; Family of Spies; The Kennedys of Massachusetts; The Phantom of the Opera

The following series received multiple nominations:

Nominations	Title
5	L.A. Law
4	Twin Peaks
3	Cheers
3	China Beach
3	The Kennedys of Massachusetts
3	Murphy Brown
2	Caroline?
2	Decoration Day
2	Empty Nest
2	Family of Spies
2	In the Heat of the Night
2	Married... with Children
2	The Phantom of the Opera
2	Quantum Leap
2	Roseanne
2	thirtysomething

The following programs received multiple wins:

Wins	Title
3	Twin Peaks
3	Cheers

== Presenters ==
=== Presenters ===
- Bea Arthur
- Annette Bening
- Nina Blackwood
- Carol Burnett
- Kirk Cameron
- Macaulay Culkin
- John Cusack
- Faye Dunaway
- Estelle Getty
- Harry Hamlin
- Gregory Hines
- James Earl Jones
- Howard Keel
- Joanna Kerns
- Cheryl Ladd
- Christine Lahti
- Shirley MacLaine
- Walter Matthau
- Rue McClanahan
- Alyssa Milano
- Ken Olin
- Linda Purl
- Anthony Quinn
- Mickey Rooney
- Bob Saget
- Maximilian Schell
- Cybill Shepherd
- Nicollette Sheridan
- Ron Silver
- Oliver Stone
- Robert Urich
- Rachel Ward
- Betty White
- Esther Williams

== Awards breakdown ==
The following networks received multiple nominations:

Nominations	Network
24	NBC
15	ABC
13	CBS
2	Fox

The following networks received multiple wins:

Wins	Network
3	NBC
3	ABC

== See also ==
- 63rd Academy Awards
- 11th Golden Raspberry Awards
- 42nd Primetime Emmy Awards
- 43rd Primetime Emmy Awards
- 44th British Academy Film Awards
- 45th Tony Awards
- 1990 in film
- 1990 in American television
