= Candy Brown =

American actress

- Occupations: Actress, dancer, choreographer
- Years active: 1968–present

Candy Brown (also known as Candy Brown Houston) is an American dancer, choreographer and theatre, film and television actress.

== Career ==
Brown is known for originating the role of June in the 1975 Bob Fosse-directed Broadway musical Chicago, and for such films, television series and stage productions as the original cast of A Chorus Line and Pippin, Zebrahead, Ali, Six Feet Under, Sister, Sister, Nash Bridges and NYPD Blue.

Brown also performed on the Broadway stage in Purlie with Cleavon Little and Sherman Hemsley and in the West Coast premiere of the play For Colored Girls Who Have Considered Suicide When the Rainbow Is Enuf.

Brown also appears in the Emmy Award winning television special Liza with a Z starring Liza Minnelli and directed by Bob Fosse.

== Filmography ==
=== Film ===
| Year | Title | Role | Notes |
|---|---|---|---|
| 1980 | Dallas Cowboys Cheerleaders II | Candy Beaumont | TV movie |
| 1980 | Heart Beat | Claudia | |
| 1980 | Up the Academy | Nubia | |
| 1981 | Don't Look Back: The Story of Leroy 'Satchel' Paige | Ramona | |
| 1984 | Rose Petal Place | Iris (voice) | TV movie |
| 1985 | Lost in America | David's Secretary | |
| 1985 | Perfect | Sports Connection Member | |
| 1986 | Christmas | Mrs. Oliver | TV movie |
| 1991 | The Killing Mind | Sylvia | TV movie |
| 1992 | Zebrahead | Marlene | |
| 1997 | Nightwatch | Female Paramedic | |
| 2001 | Baby Boy | Ms. Herron | |
| 2001 | Ali | Odessa | |
| 2007 | Paroled | Mable Henderson | |
| 2013 | The One Who Loves You | Ruby | |
| 2015 | Sold | Mickey | Short |

=== Television ===
| Year | Title | Role | Notes |
|---|---|---|---|
| 1978 | The Roller Girls | J.B. Johnson | Main cast |
| 1979 | What's Happening!! | Cindy | Episode: "Making Out" |
| 1979 | Wonder Woman | Janet | Episode: "Spaced Out" |
| 1979 | Paris | Samantha Williams | Episode: "Paris" |
| 1980 | The Misadventures of Sheriff Lobo | Black Stripper | Episode: "The Martians Are Coming, the Martians Are Coming" |
| 1980 | Lou Grant | Yvette | Episode: "Harassment" |
| 1984 | Challenge of the GoBots | A.J. Foster (voice) | Main cast |
| 1986 | Jonny Quest | Additional Voices | TV series |
| 1987 | Frank's Place | Janet | Episode: "Frank Joins the Club" |
| 1988 | She's the Sheriff | Thelma | Episode: "Hair" |
| 1988 | Amen | Ramona | Episode: "The Fantasy" |
| 1989 | Men | Margaret Hazard | Episode: "Baltimore" |
| 1990 | Doctor Doctor | Gail Butterfield | Episode: "Odd Man In" & "Doctors and Other Strangers" |
| 1990 | New Attitude | Amber | Episode: "A Star Is Born" |
| 1991 | A Different World | Professor Burton | Episode: "A Word in Edgewise" |
| 1991 | The Killing Mind | Sylvia | TV movie |
| 1991 | Quantum Leap | Dr. Verbeena Beeks | Recurring cast: season 3–4 |
| 1992 | Jake and the Fatman | Claire O'Malley | Episode: "Just You, Just Me" |
| 1992 | Roc | Janet Shaw | Episode: "Roc's Secret Past" |
| 1992–93 | The Addams Family | Additional Voices | Recurring cast |
| 1993 | Batman: The Animated Series | Marva Cooper (voice) | Episode: "The Mechanic" |
| 1993 | Bob | Joanne | Episode: "The Man Who Killed Mad Dog" |
| 1993 | The Sinbad Show | Doris Leland | Episode: "Breaking the Pattern" |
| 1994 | Sister, Sister | Natalie | Episode: "It's a Love Thang" |
| 1994–96 | NYPD Blue | Sherilee Williams | Episode: "Up on the Roof" & "Unembraceable You" |
| 1996 | Nash Bridges | Mayor Bobbie Werksman | Episode: "High Impact" |
| 1997 | Chicago Hope | Edna Jessup | Episode: "Lamb to the Slaughter" |
| 1998 | Ellen | Sue | Episode: "Escape from L.A." |
| 1998 | The Pretender | Jacob's Doctor | Episode: "Indy Show" |
| 1998 | Smart Guy | Sheila Hicks | Episode: "That's My Momma" |
| 1999 | Happily Ever After: Fairy Tales for Every Child | Old Woman (voice) | Episode: "The Happy Prince" |
| 2001 | Six Feet Under | Detective McBride | Episode: "Familia" |
| 2001–02 | Lizzie McGuire | Mrs. Stebel | Episode: "I Do, I Don't" & "In Miranda Lizzie Does Not Trust" |
| 2002 | CSI: Miami | Felicia Humphreys | Episode: "Losing Face" |
