= The Killing Mind =

American crime film of 1991

- Directed by: Michael Ray Rhodes
- Screenplay by: William W. Forsythe
- Produced by: Carol Newman
- Starring: Stephanie Zimbalist; Tony Bill
- Cinematography: Jeff Jur
- Music by: James Di Pasquale
- Production company: Hearst Entertainment
- Release date: April 23, 1991
- Running time: 96 minutes
- Country: United States
- Language: English

The Killing Mind is an American television movie of 1991 directed by Michael Ray Rhodes, starring Stephanie Zimbalist and Tony Bill.

== Storyline ==
Isobel Neiman (Stephanie Zimbalist), a police detective in Los Angeles, formerly an FBI agent, studies the case of the murder of a ballerina twenty years earlier and does not understand why it was closed. Securing the help of Thomas Quinn (Tony Bill), a journalist who had covered the story, she reopens the case. Neiman runs into resistance from male colleagues, including Captain Harris (Stan Ivar), who believe the case is cold and is beyond the abilities of a woman detective.

The killer becomes aware of Neiman's investigation and decides to kill her.

The movie is rated PG-13 for violent content and the references to drug use.

== Cast ==
- Stephanie Zimbalist as Lt. Isobel Neiman
- Tony Bill as Thomas Quinn
- Stan Ivar as Captain Harris
- Daniel Roebuck as Dennis Jepson
- Lee Tergesen as Ron Donoho
- K. Todd Freeman as Fred Robinson
- Candy Ann Brown as Sylvia
- Billy Beck as Digby
- Tim DeZarn as Gordon Atherton
- Frank Novak as Desk Officer
- Sheila Larken as Mrs Kraft
- Danielle Harris as Young Isobel
