= Long Journey Back =

1978 television drama film

- VHS cassette case
- Genre: coming of age drama Psychological drama
- Written by: Audrey Davis Levin
- Directed by: Mel Damski
- Starring: Stephanie Zimbalist; Mike Connors; Cloris Leachman; Katy Kurtzman; Howard McGillin
- Music by: Fred Karlin
- Country of origin: United States
- Original language: English

Production
- Executive producers: Philip Capice; Lee Rich
- Producer: Robert Lovenheim
- Production location: United States
- Cinematography: Stevan Larner
- Editor: Herbert H. Dow
- Running time: 100 minutes
- Production company: Lorimar Productions

Original release
- Release: December 28, 1978

Long Journey Back is a 1978 made-for-TV coming-of-age drama film based on the Gilchrest Road, New York crossing accident in which a Nyack High School bus was struck and sliced down the middle by a train, killing 5 people and injuring more than 40 others. The film stars Stephanie Zimbalist as main character Celia, who struggles with life as an amputee and with brain damage following the accident. Co-stars include Cloris Leachman and Mike Connors. The film also features a live singing of the song "Day by Day" from the musical Godspell. Zimbalist's character, as well as Katy Kurtzman's, were based on real-life sisters Irene and Joan Ferrara, who were severely injured in the accident.

== Plot ==
Celia Casella is one of the most popular students at her school, and lives with her family within walking distance. She plans to be a successful writer someday, while her younger sister, Amy Casella, is more into music and hopes to join the school band. Celia has recently broken up with her football jock boyfriend, who had wanted to walk her home, but she decides to go another route instead. To save time that day, Celia boards a school bus with her classmates. The bus stalls on a set of train tracks, and the driver desperately tries to move it, but a freight train arrives before he can do little more than honk the horn. The bus is split apart by the train, killing numerous students and also leaving many injured. While Amy shows up at the hospital looking for people she knows, Celia is critically wounded and needs to be flown by helicopter to a more urban hospital to save her injured leg. This is a risky move, as she could bleed to death on the way, but her parents insist on it. This is still not enough to save her leg, and Celia is comatose with severe brain damage and a newly-amputated leg.

When Celia wakes up, she is unaware that her leg is missing at first. She is unable to talk, but she gradually learns to write and make basic noises, and she conveys to her mother that she still feels phantom pain in the missing limb. While Amy and her parents attend church, mourning their deceased friends from the bus crash, an older girl leads the parishioners in a chorus of "Day by Day" from the musical Godspell. Celia is told that her best friend, another girl her age who was sitting on the bus beside her, is dead while Amy deals with the loss of Alan, a boy who had been teaching her to play the flute, also killed in the bus accident. Celia eventually comes to terms with her disability, wearing an artificial leg and learning to walk again. She is upset, however, when her boyfriend mocks developmentally challenged children at a local park; she shows him the learning guidebook she is studying, a "retard book", a dummy book!" that she realizes does not make her stupid for using. She also comes to realize that the only reason men and boys are so nice to her versus other disabled youth is because she is attractive and can pass for non-disabled if she wears long skirts. Her mother worries about her prospects of any sort of normality, such as being able to swim at the beach, but Celia finds value in speaking to other minor children about her disability. She begins visiting classrooms while also re-attending school in her spare time, and she shows the students her artificial leg, explaining to them that being disabled is nothing to be ashamed of.

== Cast ==
- Stephanie Zimbalist as Celia Casella
- Mike Connors as Vic Casella
- Cloris Leachman as Laura Casella
- Katy Kurtzman as Amy Casella
- Howard McGillin as Steve
- Luis Avalos as Dr. Ropaz
- Nicolas Coster as Dr. Roberts
- Richard Doran as Alan Wilcox
- Philip Levien as Jim Thompson

== Reception ==
Long Journey Back received positive reviews from critics. John J. O'Connor of The New York Times stated, "the inspirational story has been put together nicely, and the production contains several solid performances. Cloris Leachman and Mike Connors are good as the parents, and Stephanie Zimbalist is lovely as the stricken daughter."

== See also ==
- Soul Surfer, a 2011 biopic film about amputee and professional surfer Bethany Hamilton
