= Quints =

2000 American TV film

- Promotional advertisement
- Genre: Comedy; Drama
- Screenplay by: Matthew Weisman
- Directed by: Bill Corcoran
- Starring: Kimberly J. Brown; Daniel Roebuck; Elizabeth Morehead; Robin Duke
- Voices of: Stephen Fitzmaurice; J. Stanley Johnston; Timothy Pearson
- Theme music composer: Michael Tavera
- Country of origin: United States
- Original language: English

Production
- Executive producer: Stanley M. Brooks
- Producer: Nicholas Tabarrok
- Cinematography: Michael Storey
- Editor: Martin Nicholson
- Running time: 83 minutes
- Production company: Once Upon a Time Films

Original release
- Network: Disney Channel
- Release: August 18, 2000

Quints is a 2000 American comedy-drama film released as a Disney Channel Original Movie and starring Kimberly J. Brown. It follows the shifting dynamics of the Grover family, when the arrival of a set of quintuplets causes the neglect of the lone elder sister Jamie. The film was poorly received.

== Plot ==
Eighth grader Jamie is an only child who is overwhelmed by her parents' strategist personalities. Her world soon turns upside down after her mother gives birth to quintuplets (quints). They are overwhelmed with caring for five newborns and hire a live-in nanny named Fiona. After realizing they cannot afford to keep paying Fiona, they accept an opportunity to have their babies be the face of a diaper brand. The representative from the company, named Albert, starts to devise plans to keep the family and babies relevant and in the news to maintain their popularity. In doing so, he tries to keep Jamie out of any publicity and not mention her as part of the family.

The parents become so consumed with the diaper company, they start to neglect Jamie's needs. At the recommendation of her school's art teacher, Mr. Blackmer, and her best friends Zoe and Brad, she agrees to join her school's art club as an outlet. Jamie soon finds out she excels at art and truly loves it. She begins preparing for an upcoming art show by drawing portraits of each baby to surprise her parents. As the art show approaches, Albert tells Jamie's parents they are invited to a ceremony where they will be named Parents of the Year by the governor (played by Don Knotts). Discovering the event is the same night as her art show and realizing her parents forgot all about it, she is heartbroken and proceeds to destroy her art.

Soon after, Adam, one of her baby siblings, falls ill and she rushes to the hospital. He ends up being ok and the event puts everything into perspective for Jamie. She reveals to her parents how she has been feeling and that she found her true self and what she wants in life. Her parents then fire Albert after he concocts a plan to replace the sick baby with a stand-in at a future publicity event, and again outright suggests to Jamie that life is all about the quints.

Jamie then offers to babysit the quintuplets while her parents go to their event. Upon arriving the parents discover the governor wanted the babies to be there. With the help of her art teacher, a bus, and a biker gang, they get the babies to the event. The governor then tells Jamie his drivers could drive her home or anywhere she would like to go. She then decides to go to her art show where she arrives just in time to win an award for best art display. To Jamie's surprise, her parents, siblings and the governor show up on stage immediately after she is handed her award.

The closing scene reveals that the Grovers are expecting a set of septuplets- seven further babies.

== Cast ==
- Kimberly J. Brown as Jamie Grover, the older sister of Adam, Becky, Charlie, Debbie & Eddie
- Daniel Roebuck as Jim Grover, Jamie's father
- Elizabeth Morehead as Nancy Grover, Jamie's mother
- Robin Duke as Fiona, the nanny of Adam, Becky, Charlie, Debbie & Eddie
- Shadia Simmons as Zoe, Jamie's best friend
- Jake Epstein as Brad, Jamie's best friend
- Don Knotts as Governor Healy
- Vince Corazza as Albert
- James Kall as Mr. Blackmer
- Cole Corcoran as Adam Grover
- Shawn Campbell as Man In Waiting Room
- Erica Ellis as Hysterical Bridesmaid
- B.J McQueen as Biker
- Joseph Motiki as Cameraman

=== The Quints ===
- Hannah & Mya Agnew
- Nicole, Alexander & Kiersten Bell
- Jessica & Jaeden Cowan
- Travis & Troy Langstaff
- Dylan "Pickles" Brown (the actual brother of the film's lead, Kimberly J. Brown)
- Matthew & Nicolas Peres
- Aidan & Bowie Rheault
- McKenzie, Jamie & Jordan St. Louis-Ryan
- Devan, Nicole & Heather Scott

== Reception ==
Common Sense Media gave the film two stars out of five, describing it as a "lackluster coming-of-age comedy [that] fails to make the grade."
