= Stephanie Zimbalist =

American actress (born 1956)

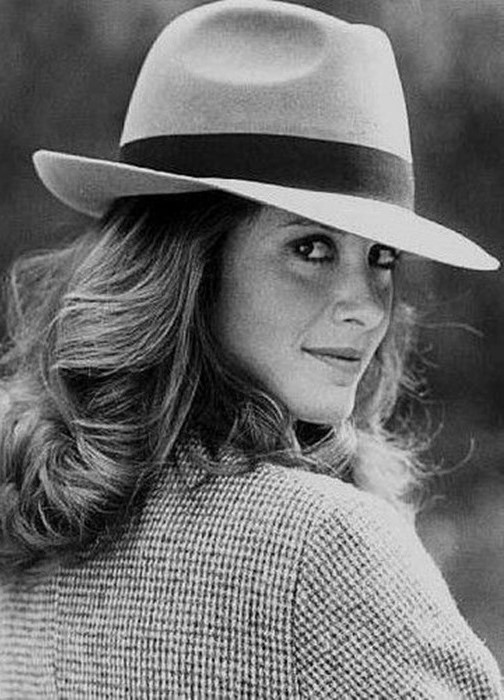
- Publicity still for Remington Steele (1982)
- Born: October 8, 1956 (age 70); New York City, U.S.
- Education: Juilliard School
- Occupation: Actress
- Years active: 1977–present
- Known for: Remington Steele; Caroline?; The Awakening; The Magic of Lassie
- Height: 5 ft 5 in (165 cm)
- Parents: Efrem Zimbalist Jr. (father); Loranda Stephanie Spalding (mother)
- Relatives: Efrem Zimbalist (paternal grandfather); Alma Gluck (paternal grandmother); Marcia Davenport (paternal aunt)

Stephanie Zimbalist (born October 8, 1956) is an American actress best known for her role as Laura Holt in the NBC detective series Remington Steele.

== Early life ==
Stephanie Zimbalist was born in New York City, the daughter of actor Efrem Zimbalist Jr. and his second wife Loranda Stephanie Spalding, a daughter of Francis Lecompte Spalding, a United States Consul General, and Loranda Stephanie, a daughter of Edgar L. G. Prochnik, former Austrian Minister to the United States. The family soon moved to Los Angeles, where Stephanie grew up, but her parents were divorced in December 1961. She was educated at the Marlborough School in Los Angeles and graduated from the Foxcroft School in Middleburg, Virginia. She attended the Juilliard School before commencing her acting career.

== Acting career ==
=== Television and film career ===
Zimbalist's early television and film appearances include The Gathering (1977, with Edward Asner), In the Matter of Karen Ann Quinlan (1977), Forever (1978), The Magic of Lassie (1978), Long Journey Back (TV, 1978), The Triangle Factory Fire Scandal (1979), The Awakening (1980), The Golden Moment (1980), in which she played a Soviet Olympic gymnast, The Babysitter (1980) and Tomorrow's Child (TV, 1982). She co-starred with her father, Efrem Zimbalist Jr., in the 1979 television film The Best Place to Be.

Another early role for Zimbalist was that of Elly Zendt in the mini-series Centennial, based on James Michener's epic novel of the same name, which was first televised on NBC between October 1978 and February 1979. She also guest-starred as Josephine "Josie" Collins in the television series Family episode "Ballerina" (1979).

In her TV work, Zimbalist is best known for her TV role of sleuth Laura Holt in the NBC series Remington Steele (1982–1987) opposite Pierce Brosnan and Doris Roberts, on which her father also guest-starred.

Since then, Zimbalist has taken leading roles in several television films, such as The Man in the Brown Suit (1988), the Emmy Award winning Caroline? (1990), The Great Elephant Escape (1995), and some guest roles in television series such as Touched by an Angel and Diagnosis Murder.

=== Theater ===
In 1979, she appeared as Miranda in John Hirsch's production of The Tempest with Anthony Hopkins (as Prospero), Brent Carver, and Michael Bond at the Mark Taper Forum in Los Angeles.

Zimbalist played opposite Tommy Tune in the touring musical My One and Only, taking the featured role of "Edith Herbert". She has made several appearances with the Rubicon Theatre Company in Ventura, California, winning the local critics' "Robby Award" for Best Actress in a Drama in The Rainmaker, at the Rubicon community theatre in 2001. Throughout the 2000s, Zimbalist took roles in plays concerning nineteenth-century artists including Chopin, Tchaikovsky and Van Gogh.

She also played Christa McAuliffe in the play Defying Gravity in 2003, written by Jane Anderson.

In 2009 she portrayed actress Katharine Hepburn in Tea at Five.

Other work

Zimbalist has also released audiobooks, including The Girls, which won a Listen-Up award in 2006, and Queen of the Underworld.

She appeared in the 2006 documentary Christa McAuliffe: Reach for the Stars.

== Personal life ==
Zimbalist's paternal grandfather, Efrem Zimbalist, born in Rostov-on-Don, Russia, was a symphony conductor, concert violinist and music teacher at the Curtis Institute in Philadelphia, and composer. Her paternal grandmother, Alma Gluck, born in Romania, was a leading soprano of her day. Zimbalist's aunt, Marcia Davenport, was a prominent author, music journalist and historian.

In a 2016 interview, she described attending a Billy Graham crusade over 15 years prior with Dean Butler, and both going down to "accept the Lord." She expressed, "I have a personal connection with my Savior... I feel very beholden to Him--for me it's a him--I feel He's there for me in my darkest moments." In the same interview, she mentioned moving out of an "inappropriate relationship" with a married man years ago, though still remaining friends.

== Stage roles ==
- Gypsy (1969)
- Stars & Stripes (1970)
- Little Mary Sunshine (1971)
- Peter Pan (1974)
- Kiss Me Kate (1976)
- Festival (1979)
- The Tempest (1979)
- The Babysitter (1980)
- American Mosaic (1982)
- The Cherry Orchard (1983)
- Barbarians (1986)
- Summer & Smoke (1986)
- My One & Only (1987)
- Carousel (1988)
- The Baby Dance (1990–1991)
- The Threepenny Opera (1992)
- The Philadelphia Story (1992–1993)
- The Crimson Thread (1994)
- AdWars (1995)
- Sylvia (1996–1997)
- Wonderful Town (1997)
- Mr. Bundy (1998)
- The Gregory Peck Reading Series (1998)
- Denial (1999)
- Far East (1999)
- 14th Annual Tennessee Williams / New Orleans Literary Festival (2000)
- Side Man (2000)
- Accomplice (2000)
- The Rainmaker (2000–2001)
- Walking Wounded (2000)
- A Cowardly Cavalcade (2000)
- The Gregory Peck Reading Series (2001)
- 15th Annual Tennessee Williams/New Orleans Literary Festival (2001)
- 16th Annual Tennessee Williams/New Orleans Literary Festival (2002)
- The Cherry Orchard (2002)
- Dancing At Lughnasa (2003)
- Tall Tales (2003)
- Romantique (2003)
- Defying Gravity (2003)
- Follies (2004)
- Vincent in Brixton (2004)
- The Night of the Iguana (2004)
- Confidentially Chaikovski (2005)
- Theater 150's 10-Minute Play Festival (2006)
- Mesmeric Mozart (2006)
- 20th Annual Tennessee Williams/New Orleans Literary Festival (2006)
- Tea At Five (2006, 2009, 2010, 2012)
- The Memory of Water (2007)
- Hamlet (2007)
- A Little Night Music (2007), (2013)
- You Can't Take It With You (2007)
- 22nd Annual Tennessee Williams/New Orleans Literary Festival (2008)
- The Spin Cycle (2008)
- The Price (2009)
- Truth and Justice (2010)
- The Subject Was Roses (2011)
- Steel Magnolias (2011, 2013)
- The Lion in Winter (2011)
- Sex and Education (2014)
- Living on Love (2015)

== Filmography ==
=== Film ===
Year	Title	Role	Notes
1978	The Magic of Lassie	Kelly Mitchell	
1980	The Awakening	Margaret Corbeck	
2000	The Prophet's Game	Francis Aldobrandi	
2001	Borderline Normal	Vicky Walling	
2001	Malpractice	Beth Garrett	
2006	Truth	Meredith	Video
2006	Lucy's Piano	Alice	Short
2008	The Delivery	The Red Queen	Short
2015	Hamlet's Ghost	Justina Keller / Queen Gertrude	
2016	His Neighbor Phil	Mary	
2023	Lucky Louie	Pastor Mimi	

=== Television ===
Year	Title	Role	Notes
1977	Yesterday's Child	Ann Talbot	Television film
1977	Lucan	Tashi	Episode: "Listen to the Heart Beat"
1977	In the Matter of Karen Ann Quinlan	Mary Ellen Quinlan	Television film
1977	The Gathering	Toni	Television film
1978	Forever	Katherine Danziger	Television film
1978	The Love Boat	Jenny Lang	Episode: "The Caper"
1978	Long Journey Back	Celia Casella	Television film
1978–1979	Centennial	Elly Zendt	TV miniseries
1979	The Triangle Factory Fire Scandal	Connie	Television film
1979	Family	Josie	Episode: "Ballerina"
1979	The Best Place to Be	Maryanne Callahan	Television film
1980	Hagen	Linda	Episode: "Hear No Evil"
1980	The Golden Moment: An Olympic Love Story	Anya Andreyev	Television film
1980	The Babysitter	Joanna Redwine	Television film
1981	Elvis and the Beauty Queen	Linda Thompson	Television film
1982	Tomorrow's Child	Kay Spence	Television film
1982–1987	Remington Steele	Laura Holt	Main role
1985	Love on the Run	Diana Rockland	Television film
1985	The Greatest Adventure: Stories from the Bible	Eve (voice)	Episode: "The Creation"
1985	A Letter to Three Wives	Debra Bishop	Television film
1987	Celebration Family	Janet Marston	Television film
1989	The Man in the Brown Suit	Anne Beddingfeld	Television film
1989	The Hitchhiker	Heather	Episode: "Hootch"
1990	Personals	Sarah Martin	Television film
1990	Caroline?	Caroline	Television film
1991	The Killing Mind	Isobel Neiman	Television film
1991	The Story Lady	Julie Pollard	Television film
1992	Breaking the Silence	Janey Kirkland	Television film
1992	Sexual Advances	Paula Pratt	Television film
1993	The Hidden Room	Della	Episode: "While She Was Out"
1993	Jericho Fever	Bonnie Whitney	Television film
1994	Incident in a Small Town	Lily Margaret Bell	Television film
1994	Batman: The Animated Series	Janet Van Dorn (voice)	Episode: "Trial"
1994	Voices from Within	Ann Parkhurst	Television film
1995	The Great Elephant Escape	Beverly Cunningham	Television film
1995	Whose Daughter Is She?	Cathy	Television film
1996	Stop the World – I Want to Get Off	Evie	Television film
1996	Dead Ahead	Maura Loch	Television film
1997	Touched by an Angel	Dr. Kate Calder	Episode: "My Dinner with Andrew"
1997	Prison of Secrets	Lynn Schaffer	Television film
1999	Twice in a Lifetime	Dana Hancock / Ann Rutherford	Episode: "Ashes to Ashes"
1999	Diagnosis: Murder	Vanessa Sellars	Episode: "The Seven Deadly Sins"
1999	Chicken Soup for the Soul	Mom	Episode: "Simple Wooden Boxes"
2000	Family Law	Elizabeth Lane	Episode: "Second Chance"
2001	V.I.P.	Bobbi Canary	Episode: "Get Vallery"
2001	Nash Bridges	Joy Larson	Episode: "Kill Joy"
2001	Touched by an Angel	Jessica Albright	Episode: "Heaven's Portal"
2003	Crossing Jordan	Mrs. Sullivan	Episode: "Cruel & Unusual"
2003	Judging Amy	Ms. Friedman	Episode: "Marry, Marry Quite Contrary"

== Awards and nominations ==
Year	Association	Category	Nominated work	Result
1981	8th Saturn Awards	Saturn Award for Best Supporting Actress	The Awakening	Nominated
1991	Golden Globe Award	Golden Globe Award for Best Actress - Miniseries or Television Film	Caroline?	Nominated
