= Star Trek: The Continuing Mission =

- Poster
- Genre: science fiction/Fan Series
- Created by: Sebastian Prooth and Andy Tyrer
- Written by: Sebastian Prooth, Andy Tyrer, Patrick McCray, David Raines
- No. of seasons: 2
- No. of episodes: 8

Production
- Producers: Andy Tyrer, Mathieu Blondin

Original release
- Release: December 25, 2007 – present

Star Trek: The Continuing Mission is an independently produced, non-profit, science fiction series set in the Star Trek universe. The show, created by Sebastian Prooth and Andy Tyrer in July 2007, is released exclusively online in the form of downloadable audio dramas. Sebastian Prooth and Patrick McCray serve as the show’s Executive Producers.

The pilot episode, "Ghost Ship," was released on December 25, 2007, and since then seven more episodes have been released, the latest of which was "Cathedral in the Void" released May 10, 2014. The producers' stated goal is for future releases to be on a quarterly basis.

== Summary ==
The Continuing Mission follows the adventures of the Trieste-class, USS Montana NCC-1786 and its crew led by seven humans and a Betazoid. The premise involves the Montana and her crew’s unexpected transference from the 23rd century, around the time of Star Trek II: The Wrath of Khan, to the 24th century, approximately ten years prior to the continuity of Star Trek: The Next Generation where they are re-integrated into a very different Starfleet from which they came.

Both the USS Montana and its crew are original characters created specifically for this series. Though references to canonical Star Trek names, places, and events appear in the series, the events depicted in the series are not official canon.

However, it is notable that the setting of Star Trek: Discovery in season 3 closely resembles story elements from ‘’The Continuing Mission’, especially the permanent transference of a Starfleet crew into a later timeline.

== Cast and crew ==
=== Main cast ===
- Scott Martineck as Captain Paul Edwards (Season 2 )/ Science Officer Stephen Knight (Season 1)
- Tim Renshaw as Captain Paul Edwards (Season 1)
- Stephen Perkins as Commander Darius Locke / Murray
- Patrick McCray as Chief Engineer Jack McGuire / Dr. Clairemont
- Brian Bonner as Chief of Security and Tactical Officer Thomas J. Plummer / General Kailagg
- Gabriel Diani as Chief Medical Officer Kyle Wilson
- Etta Devine as Helmsman Susan Palmer
- Tiffany Tallent as Science Officer Numi Natukov and Media Liaison Kelly Natukov
- James Francis as Science Officer Stephen Knight (Season 2)
- Jim Manikas as Communications Officer Peter Gillmohr
- Sam Stinson as Narrator / Voice of the Series (Season 2)
- Joe Klein as Narrator / Voice of the Series (Season 1)
- Cheralyn Lambeth as Computer Voice

=== Recurring and guest characters ===
- Corinne Tandy as Operations Officer, Telara, and Nurse Beldon.
- Craig Clayton as Engineering Officer Michaels
- Matt Adams as Security Officer Meechum
- Alec Lee as Benjamin Poole
- Ben Nelson as Ensign Martin
- James Francis as Ensign Bishop
- John Mayer as Constable Delnya
- Charles Miller as Sytok
- Giles Aston as Barman
- Tyler McBride as Waiter
- Justin Plummer as Starbase Engineer
- Dr. Wohlschlegel as Himself
- Tom Cook as Admiral Shore (Integration)

=== Production crew ===
- Andy Tyrer - Creator, Executive Producer, Writer, Director, Editor (Season 1)
- Sebastian Prooth - Creator, Executive Producer, Writer, Director
- Patrick McCray - Executive Producer, Writer, Director
- David Raines, Writer
- Tim Renshaw - Additional Sound Editing (Season 1)
- Tom Cook - Additional Sound Editing (Season 1)

=== Awards and recognition ===
- For the pilot episode, Star Trek: The Continuing Mission was featured and reviewed on the December 20, 2007 edition of CNN.com 3
- In January 2009 TrekMovie.com named Star Trek: The Continuing Mission 'Best of 2008' 6

== Episodes ==
#	Title	Release date	Writer
1	"Ghost Ship"	December 25, 2007	Andy Tyrer and Sebastian Prooth
2	"Integration"	Part I: May 4, 2008; Part II: July 27, 2008	Sebastian Prooth, Andy Tyrer and Patrick McCray
3	"Learning Curve"	October 31, 2008	Andy Tyrer
4	"The Darkest of Thoughts"	January, 2009	David Raines
5	"Command Decision"	June, 2009	David Raines
6	"We Will Control All That You See and Hear"	Fall 2009	David Raines
7	"Earth"	August 27, 2011	David Raines
8	"Cathedral in the Void"	May 10, 2014	David Raines

== Guest stars ==
Actor	Character	Episode	Connection to the Star Trek Universe
Lawrence Montaigne	Commander Vellar	"Ghost Ship"	Montaigne played the Romulan, Decius, in the original series episode "Balance of Terror" placing him amongst the very first Romulans to ever appear on screen in Star Trek: The Original Series. He also played Spock's Vulcan rival, Stonn, in the episode "Amok Time."
Guy Vardaman	Abdiel	"Command Decision"	Vardaman worked as an extra and photo double for actor Brent Spiner on Star Trek: The Next Generation.
Daniel Roebuck	Admiral Rowan	"We Will Control All That You See and Hear"	Roebuck guest starred in the episode "Unification" of Star Trek: The Next Generation.
Spice Williams-Crosby	Captain Merrick	"We Will Control All That You See and Hear"	Williams-Crosby starred as Vixis the female Klingon in Star Trek V: The Final Frontier and has performed stunts on Star Trek television episodes.
Celeste Yarnall	T'pauk of Vulcan	"We Will Control All That You See and Hear"	Yarnall guest-starred on the Star Trek: The Original Series episode "The Apple" as Ensign Martha Landon.
Larry Nemecek	Commander Dolding	"We Will Control All That You See and Hear"	Nemecek is a prolific Star Trek author and appeared in the Star Trek: Enterprise series finale "These Are the Voyages...".
Evan English	Captain Musaki	"We Will Control All That You See and Hear"	English worked as an extra and stand-in on Star Trek: Enterprise.
Mark Allen Shepherd	Commander Miller	"We Will Control All That You See and Hear"	Allen-Shepherd appeared in every season of Star Trek: Deep Space Nine as Quark's silent but friendly customer, Morn.
