= Rose Petal Place =

1984 American animated film

- Directed by: Charles August Nichols
- Screenplay by: Mal Marmorstein
- Produced by: David Kirschner
- Starring: Marie Osmond, Susan Blu, Candy Ann Brown, Renae Jacobs, Marilyn Schreffler, Frank Welker, Nicole Eggert
- Edited by: Sam Horta
- Music by: Dean Elliott
- Production company: Ruby-Spears Enterprises
- Distributed by: Worldvision Enterprises
- Release date: September 14, 1984
- Running time: 22 minutes
- Country: United States
- Language: English

Rose Petal Place is an American-produced animated film from 1984 made by Ruby-Spears, with a corresponding line of flower-themed dolls made by Kenner Products. The concept for Rose Petal Place was created by David Kirschner and the film was written by Mal Marmorstein. The film was directed by Charles August Nichols, and was released in syndication in May 1984.

== History ==
Rose Petal Place was introduced in the 1980s as an animated film which also included a corresponding toy line and playsets. Rose Petal dolls were markedly similar to the fruit and dessert-themed Strawberry Shortcake dolls, also made by Kenner. The Rose Petal dolls themselves were flower-themed and based on different types of flowers.

According to the toys' boxes and the movie, Rose Petal Place began a long time ago when a young girl (played by Nicole Eggert) was moving away from her lovely home and garden. She cried for her beloved garden because no one would be there to take care of her flowers. She didn't want them to perish, so she made a secret wish that the flowers would live forever. Out of this magical wish, combined with her tears of love, brought Rose Petal and all of her friends (Lily Fair, Daffodil, Orchid, Sunny Sunflower, and Iris) to life. Now living forever, Rose Petal and her friends reside in the garden and tend the little girl's flowers, but face trouble from the nefarious plots of Nastina the spider and her assistant Horace Fly.

Other accessories which were produced included lunchboxes, books, games, stickers, and various fashions for the dolls.

== Characters ==
The primary characters of Rose Petal Place were:

- Rose Petal, a pink-haired, pink-clad doll whose singing keeps the other flowers alive. In the cartoon, Rose Petal was voiced by Marie Osmond.
- Sunny Sunflower, a yellow haired and clad tomboy who tells jokes to make the other flowers laugh. She is Rose Petal's closest companion and voiced by Susan Blu.
- Lily Fair, a blue haired and clad ballet dancer. Her voice actor was Renae Jacobs.
- Daffodil, another yellow haired and clad doll, this one obsessed with finance. She was also voiced by Susan Blu.
- Orchid, a purple clad shopaholic with pale lavender hair. She was also voiced by Renae Jacobs.
- Iris, a purple and white clad painter of African ethnicity. Voiced by Candy Ann Brown.
- Nastina, a widow spider who attempts to thwart the flowers' happiness, and even to kill Rose Petal on one occasion. Nastina is assisted by a horse-fly, Horace (voiced by Frank Welker), who didn't get a toy. Voiced by Marilyn Schreffler.

The animated special also featured five other characters, Elmer, an Elm tree who watches over the garden, Seymour J. Snailsworth, a wise and helpful snail, P.D. Centipede, a sports-oriented centipede (all voiced by Frank Welker), Tumbles, a friendly hedgehog and a lavender-colored kitten named Pitterpat.

== Rose Petal Place: Real Friends (1985) ==
David Kirschner Productions and Ruby-Spears Enterprises created a second movie in 1985 called Rose Petal Place: Real Friends. The film was directed by Charles August Nichols. This second movie introduced six new characters, which Kenner scheduled to be released as dolls shortly after. Although prototypes and marketing samples were made, the entire line was discontinued before the dolls could hit the shelves.

== The second series of unproduced dolls ==
- Cherry Blossom, an Asian character wearing a cherry pink kimono. She enjoys interior decorating.
- Sweet Violet, a light blue haired and clad actress.
- Fuchsia, a dark purple haired doll with fuchsia clothing and a taste for clothing design.
- Gladiola, a blonde doll with light pink clothes and a taste for tap dancing.
- Marigold, an orange haired and clad organizer of events.
- Canterbury Belle, a pink haired and clad baker.

== Book and cassette episode list ==
In 1984, Parker Brothers put out a series of three books with accompanying cassette tapes, six books without cassettes, one Panorama book, and four coloring books, as well as the record.

No.	Title	ISBN or OCLC number	Featured characters
1	"Rose Petal and the Evil Weeds"	OCLC 12867358	Rose Petal, Iris, Daffodil, Elmer, Sunny Sunflower, Tumbles the Hedgehog, Nastina, Horace, Seymour J. Snailsworth, P.D. Centipede, Pitterpat, Orchid, Lily Fair
2	"A Matter of Music"	OCLC 42553148	Rose Petal, Iris, Daffodil, Elmer, Sunny Sunflower, Tumbles the Hedgehog, Nastina, Horace, Seymour J. Snailsworth, P.D. Centipede, Pitterpat, Orchid, Lily Fair
3	"A Garden of Love to Share (cassette)"	ISBN 0910313636	Rose Petal, Iris, Daffodil, Elmer, Sunny Sunflower, Tumbles the Hedgehog, Nastina, Horace, Seymour J. Snailsworth, P.D. Centipede, Pitterpat, Orchid, Lily Fair
4	"A Garden of Love to Share (storybook)"	ISBN 0910313490	Rose Petal, Iris, Daffodil, Elmer, Sunny Sunflower, Tumbles the Hedgehog, Nastina, Horace, Seymour J. Snailsworth, P.D. Centipede, Pitterpat, Orchid, Lily Fair
5	"A Garden of Love to Share (Panorama storybook)"	ISBN 0910313563	Rose Petal, Iris, Daffodil, Elmer, Sunny Sunflower, Tumbles the Hedgehog, Nastina, Horace, Seymour J. Snailsworth, P.D. Centipede, Pitterpat, Orchid, Lily Fair
6	"The Fantastic Fashion Show"	ISBN 0910313504	Rose Petal, Iris, Daffodil, Elmer, Sunny Sunflower, Tumbles the Hedgehog, Nastina, Horace, Seymour J. Snailsworth, P.D. Centipede, Pitterpat, Orchid, Lily Fair
7	"Lily Fair Learns a Lesson"	ISBN 0910313512	Rose Petal, Iris, Daffodil, Elmer, Sunny Sunflower, Tumbles the Hedgehog, Nastina, Horace, Seymour J. Snailsworth, P.D. Centipede, Pitterpat, Orchid, Lily Fair
8	"Love Helps You Grow"	ISBN 091031358X	Rose Petal, Iris, Daffodil, Elmer, Sunny Sunflower, Tumbles the Hedgehog, Nastina, Horace, Seymour J. Snailsworth, P.D. Centipede, Pitterpat, Orchid, Lily Fair
9	"Rose Petal's Big Decision"	ISBN 0910313520	Rose Petal, Iris, Daffodil, Elmer, Sunny Sunflower, Tumbles the Hedgehog, Nastina, Horace, Seymour J. Snailsworth, P.D. Centipede, Pitterpat, Orchid, Lily Fair
10	"Fun Is All Around You"	ISBN 0910313598	Rose Petal, Iris, Daffodil, Elmer, Sunny Sunflower, Tumbles the Hedgehog, Seymour J. Snailsworth, P.D. Centipede, Pitterpat, Orchid, Lily Fair

== A Concert at Carnation Hall ==
Rose Petal Place: A Concert at Carnation Hall

Studio album by Marie Osmond
- Released: 1984
- Recorded: Counterpoint Recording Studio, New York
- Genre: Children
- Length: 26:00
- Label: Parker Brothers
- Producers: Stephen Chapin and Tom Chapin

Also in 1984, Parker Brothers released an album with Marie Osmond reprising her role.

== Track listing ==
Side 1

1. "Elmer's Song" (Tom and Stephen Chapin)
2. "A Special Place" (Tom and Stephen Chapin)
3. "Carnation Hall" (John Forster)
4. "Nastina, The Beauty Queen (John Forster)
5. "Little Bit Of Love (John Carney and Tom Chapin)

Side 2

1. "Rehearsal Song" (Tom Chapin, Stephen Chapin and John Carney)
2. "Coral Bells" (John Forster)
3. "Amazing" (John Carney, John Forster, Stephen and Tom Chapin)
4. "Look Inside" (John Forster)
5. "If You Have Love In Your Heart" (John Carney)

== Vocals ==
- Rose Petal - Marie Osmond
- Nastina - Evalyn Baron
- Male Character Voices - Russell Horton
- The Flowers - Marina Belica, Victoria Blumenthal, Jessica Craven, Katie Irving, Merle Miller
- Background - Stephen Chapin, Tom Chapin, The Suits

== Personnel ==
- Stephen Chapin - producer
- Tom Chapin - producer
- Fannie H. Cromwell - executive producer
- William C. Coleburn - executive producer
- Jaime Chapin - production coordinator
- Gary Chester - engineer
- Tommy "Monst" Civello - assistant engineer

== Musicians ==
- Piano - Warren Bernhardt, Stephen Chapin, Robbie Kondor
- Guitar - Tom Chapin, Georg Wadenius
- Banjo - Tom Chapin
- Bass - Wayne Pedzwater
- Drums - Richard Crooks, Barry Lazarowitz
- Synthesizer - Robbie Kondor
- Percussion - Brian Slawson
- Violins - Harry Cykman (concertmaster), Ann Barak, Glenn Dicterow, Harry Glickman, Raymond Gniewek, Regis Iandiorio, Gemma Sroczyńska
- Violas - Emanuel Vardi, Leonore Weinstock
- Celli - Jesse Levy, George Kim Scholes, Mark Shuman
- Flute/Piccolo - Barbara Hart, George Marge
- Oboe - Dennis Anderson, David Diggs, Alva Hunt
- English Horn - George Marge
- Clarinet - Al Regni, Dave Tofani
- Bass Clarinet - Albert Regni
- Bassoons - John Campo, Wally Kane
- French Horn - Mark Sonder, Brooks Tillotson, Lawrence Wechsler
- Trumpet - Danny Cahn, Robert Millikan
- Trombone - Dave Bargeron, Arthur Baron
- Tuba - David Braynard
- Harp - Margaret Ross

== See also ==
- Flora (mythology)
