= Mark Allen Shepherd =

American actor (b. 1961)

- Born: January 7, 1961 (age 65)
- Education: Roger Williams University (BSc); California Institute of the Arts
- Occupations: Actor, artist
- Notable work: Star Trek: Deep Space Nine

Mark Allen Shepherd (born January 7, 1961) is an actor, best known for his role as Morn on Star Trek: Deep Space Nine. He also appeared as Morn (uncredited) in one episode each of Star Trek: The Next Generation and Star Trek: Voyager.

== Biography and career ==
Shepherd received a Bachelor of Science degree in biology from Roger Williams University in Rhode Island. After graduation, he moved to Southern California and studied at the California Institute of the Arts, focusing on music, film, theater, performance, and interdisciplinary arts.

Shepherd is an artist and has created numerous abstract impressionist paintings, mixing media types into photomosaics. Twenty-four of his works have been used as set dressing on Star Trek: Deep Space Nine.

Shepherd is also a member of Plural Dolt, an absurdist music theater group based in Los Angeles.

In 2009, Shepherd voiced the role of Alex Miller on the fan produced audio series Star Trek: The Continuing Mission.
