= Renae Jacobs =

American voice actress (born 1957)

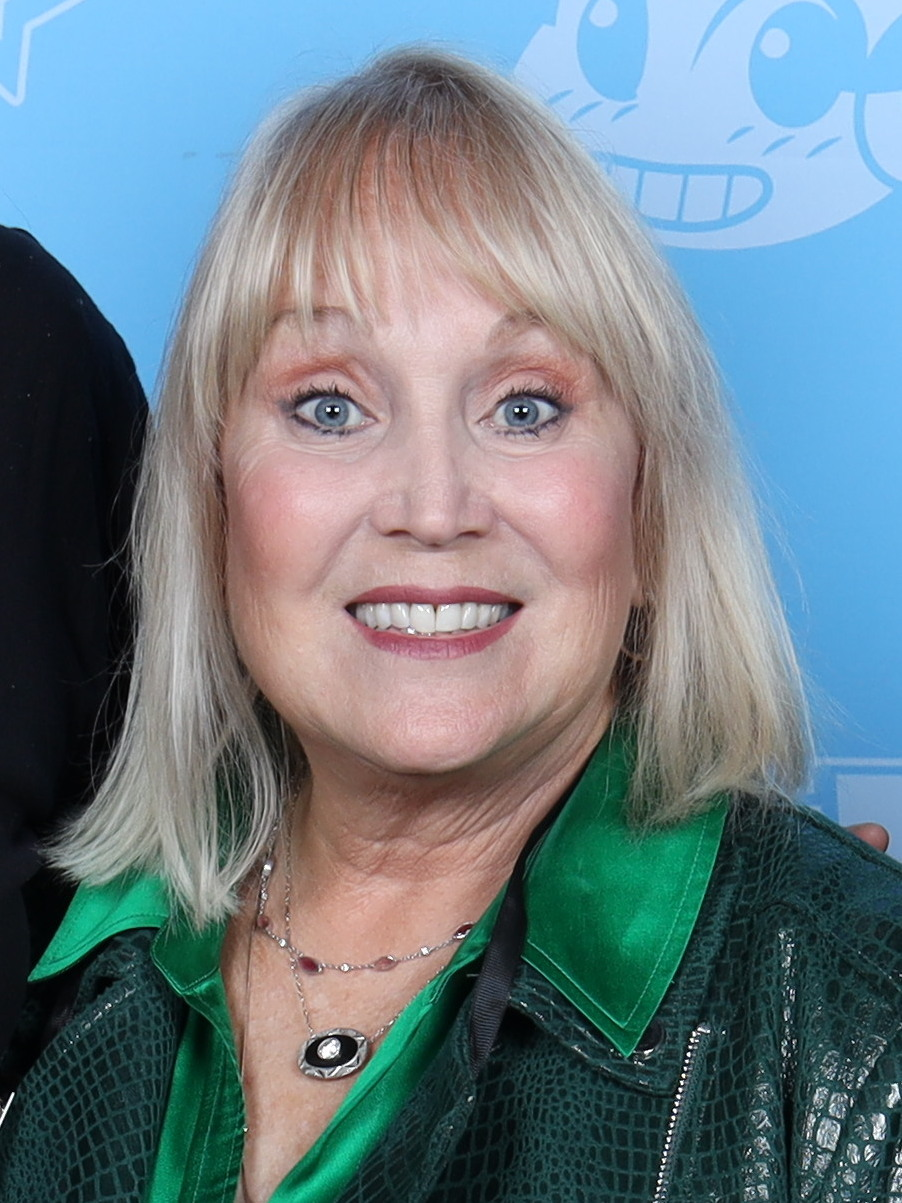
- Jacobs at Animate! Columbus in 2024
- Born: February 1, 1957 (age 68); Lansing, Michigan, U.S.
- Occupation: Voice actress
- Years active: 1984–present
- Spouse: Dr. David Anson (m. 1985)
- Children: 2

Renae Jacobs (born February 1, 1957) is an American voice actress, who is perhaps best known for voicing journalist and reporter April O'Neil in the original Teenage Mutant Ninja Turtles animated series.

== Early life ==
Renae Jacobs was born February 1, 1957, in Lansing, Michigan, moving to Los Angeles in the early 1980s to pursue a career as a voice actress.

== Teenage Mutant Ninja Turtles ==
While working in Los Angeles in 1986, she received a call to audition for Teenage Mutant Ninja Turtles. She was directed through the audition by Stu Rosen. The first day Rosen made it clear he didn't approve of her for the role, and had waited to show her audition after exhausting all the others.

Every one I played, the producers said 'No, no, no, that's not April,' and finally I was out of people to show them, so I pulled your audition out and played it for them and they said 'That's April!'

— Stu Rosen

She has said that she developed her initial personification of O'Neil after reading the description in the casting material, not the comics themselves:

There was a very good character description of her, so I looked at that and I kind of built her based on me. I felt that she should be a very strong character with very good convictions, she should be a loyal friend; she should be serious about her work and she wanted to be taken seriously, not just looked at as another pretty face.

It was also the first role she was awarded that wasn't a "crazy little made up fantasy character".

In June 2014, it was announced that Jacobs would guest-star on season three of Nickelodeon's Teenage Mutant Ninja Turtles. She played April's long-lost mother in the episode "Buried Secrets" who was, in truth, a Kraang creature that had been infused with the human DNA of the real Mrs. O'Neil as an infiltration experiment.

== Voice work, appearances ==
She appeared as a contestant on the NBC game show Sale of the Century in late 1985. In her introduction by hostess Summer Bartholomew, she was described as being "known for her animated personality". Although she did not win her game, she did win almost $900 in cash & prizes. However, her episode ended with the winner winning that week's featured car off the Winner's Board.

She was also the "Lady of the Maze" in the first season of the Family Channel game show Masters of the Maze.

She has also done voices in other animated series and films including The Glo Friends Save Christmas, It's Punky Brewster!, The Adventures of Don Coyote and Sancho Panda, Moon Dreamers, My Little Pony and all films of Rose Petal Place.

== Personal life ==
Jacobs has been married to periodontist Dr. David Anson since May 26, 1985. They have a daughter Ariel (born in 1988) and a son Spencer (born in 1992).

== Filmography ==
- Rose Petal Place (animated TV film) (1984)
- Rose Petal Place: Real Friends (animated TV film) (1985)
- It's Punky Brewster! (animated TV series) (1985) - Additional Voices
- The Glo Friends Save Christmas (animated TV film) (1985)
- My Little Pony (animated TV series) (1986) - Additional Voices
- Moon Dreamers (animated TV series) (1986) - Additional Voices
- Teenage Mutant Ninja Turtles (animated TV series) (1987–1996) - April O'Neil (voice), Lotus Blossom (voice), Additional Voices
- The Adventures of Don Coyote and Sancho Panda (animated TV series) (1990) - Additional Voices
- Masters of the Maze (TV series) (1994–1996) Season 1 - "Lady of the Maze"
- Bride of Chucky (1998) - vocals for Baby Glen (uncredited)
- Teenage Mutant Ninja Turtles (animated TV series) (2014) - Mrs. O'Neil/Mom Thing (voice; "Buried Secrets")

Preceded by N/A	Masters of the Maze "Lady of the Maze"; Season 1 (1994)	Succeeded by Clea Montville (Season 2)
