= Billy Beck =

American actor (1920-2011)

- Publicity Photo of Billy Beck
- Born: Frank Billerbeck; May 26, 1920; Philadelphia, Pennsylvania, U.S.
- Died: June 29, 2011 (aged 91); Glendale, California, U.S.
- Occupation: Actor
- Years active: 1954–2009

Billy Beck (born Frank Billerbeck; May 26, 1920 – June 29, 2011) was an American clown and character actor.

== Life ==
Born Frank Billerbeck on May 26, 1920 in Philadelphia, Pennsylvania. Billy did drawings of clowns as a kid. Beck fought in World War II with the Allied Forces in France during the 1940's and returned in 1948 to Paris, France.

== Career ==
After fighting with the Allied Forces in France during World War II, Beck returned to Europe in 1948 to Paris, France, where he began his show business career acting in French films.

Beck began his career as a clown at the legendary Cirque Medrano in Paris, France, in the late 1950s, and appeared in small roles beginning in the 1950s, Beck appeared in the 1954 made for television series Sherlock Holmes, starring Ronald Howard.

On TV he portrayed Coco the Clown in episode #24, "The Night Train Mystery", as well as appearing as Rafe in the third season of Combat! in the episode "The Town That Went Away " (1964) as Rafe and in S11E22's “The Wishbone” as Mr. Tonkins in the TV Western Gunsmoke (1966).

He also appeared in such films as Irma la Douce (1963), The Patsy (1964), The Fortune Cookie (1966), Nickelodeon (1976), House (1986), and the 1988 remake The Blob as the first victim of the title creature.

== Death ==
Beck died in his Glendale home of natural causes on June 29, 2011, at age 91.

== Filmography ==
Year	Title	Role	Notes
1957	Comme un cheveu sur la soupe		
1959	Two Men in Manhattan	Le partenaire de Judith Nelson sur scène	
1963	Irma la Douce	Officer Dupont	
1963	Combat!	Duboise	Episode: "No Trumpets, No Drums"
1963	Combat!	French Priest	Episode: "Ambush"
1964	Combat!	Rafe	Episode: "The Town That Went Away"
1964	The Best Man	Party Guest	Uncredited
1964	The Patsy	Band Member	Uncredited
1964	A House Is Not a Home	Goggle-Eyed Man	
1964	Kiss Me, Stupid	Serious Waiter at Desert Sands	Uncredited
1966	Fireball 500	Jobber	
1966	The Fortune Cookie	Maury's Assistant	
1967	Valley of the Dolls	Man Sleeping in Movie Theatre	Uncredited
1974	Dirty O'Neil	Craddock	
1974	Airport 1975	Funeral Director - Passenger	Uncredited
1976	Nickelodeon	Movie Fanatic	
1977	First Love	Cafeteria Proprietor	Uncredited
1978	Mean Dog Blues	Deadman	
1980	Diff'rent Strokes	The guard	Episode: "The Bank Job"
1980	The Black Marble	Man at Cemetery	
1980	A Change of Seasons	Older Man	
1980	Stir Crazy	Flycatching Prisoner	
1980	First Family	French Delegate	
1981	Buddy Buddy	Gentleman	
1982	Things Are Tough All Over	Pop, Manager Red Wagon Adult Motel	
1984	Bachelor Party	Patient	
1984	The Woman in Red	Bartender	
1984	Micki & Maude	Finn	
1985	Avenging Angel	Tall Man	
1985	Moving Violations	Grandfather	
1985	When Nature Calls		(segment "Raging Bullshit")
1985	House	Priest	
1987	Near Dark	Motel Manager	
1987	Baby Boom	Roofer	
1988	The Blob	Can Man	
1989	Memories of Me	Angry Man	
1989	Checking Out	Father Carmody	
1991	Guilty as Charged	Old Man	
1991	The Killing Mind	Digby	
1991	Another You	Harry	
1991	The Dark Wind	Motel Clerk	
1992	Brain Donors	Janitor	
1993	Silent Tongue	Petrified Man	
1994	Leprechaun 2	Homeless Man	
1999	Mystery Men	Old Man	
2005	Just like Heaven	Mr. Clarke	
2008	Uncross the Stars	Old Man	
