= In the Matter of Karen Ann Quinlan =

1977 film directed by Glenn Jordan

In the Matter of Karen Ann Quinlan is a 1977 American television film about Karen Ann Quinlan. It was directed by Glenn Jordan.

"This is a drama without a heavy," said producer Warren Bush.

== Cast ==
- Brian Keith as Joe Quinlan
- Piper Laurie as Julie Quinlan
- David Huffman as Paul Armstrong
- Stephanie Zimbalist as Mary Ellen Quinlan
- Biff McGuire as Father Tom
- David Spielberg as Dr Mason
- Bert Freed as Dr Julius Korein
- Louise Latham as Sister Mary Luke
- Mary Anne Grayson as Karen
- Habib Ageli as Dr Hanif
- Byron Morrow as Attorney General

== Reception ==
The New York Times wrote it was "affecting" largely due to the performances of Laurie and Keith.
