= Masters of the Maze =

Children's television game show

- Title card from Season 1
- Genre: Game show
- Created by: Hal Berger; Fenton Rosewarne; Richard S. Kline
- Directed by: Richard S. Kline
- Presented by: J. D. Roth (Season 1); Mario Lopez (Season 2)
- Starring: Renae Jacobs (Season 1); Clea Montville (Season 2)
- Voices of: Mark Maxwell-Smith
- Composer: Greg Edmonson
- Country of origin: United States
- No. of seasons: 2
- No. of episodes: 80

Production
- Executive producers: Richard S. Kline; Hal Berger; Fenton Rosewarne; James M. Dowaliby
- Producer: Richard S. Kline
- Production location: CBS Studio Center
- Running time: 22 Minutes
- Production companies: Kline and Friends; Image Entertainment; Fenton Group Interactive Technology & Entertainment; International Family Entertainment

Original release
- Network: Family Channel
- Release: August 29, 1994 – September 22, 1996

Masters of the Maze is a children's television game show that aired on the Family Channel from August 29, 1994, to September 22, 1996. The first season was hosted by J. D. Roth, and the second season was hosted by Mario Lopez.

== Broadcast and production history ==
A few years before Masters of the Maze first aired, Australian Fenton Rosewarne created a puzzle called "Fenton's Maze", which Janet Weeks said that it combined elements of Trivial Pursuit and Rubik's Cube. Hal Berger, designer of the Power Glove, through his company IMAGE design and entertainment turned Fenton's Maze into an electronic game, licensed the product to Tiger Electronics, and then sold the game show concept to the Family Channel.

The show, a two time Emmy-nominated (1995 and 1996) game show for kids, was taped in a 65-by-85 foot studio at CBS Studio Center. The second season consisted of 40 shows, taped five per day. According to co-executive producer Richard Kline, the concept of the show is "to allow viewers at home to get inside the video game". The opening sequence was created by CBS Digital.

N. F. Mendoza, in an article in the Los Angeles Times printed the day before the show's premiere, referred to defusing a multi-level time bomb, and at one point in the article, referenced the show with the title TimeBomb.

=== Audition process ===
For the second season, there were 500 prospective contestants vying for 120 contestant spots. The auditions included a 25-question test, a narrative, as well as inhibition-testing events like a tug-of-war, a story-completion exercise, and a blindfolded trip through an obstacle course of folding chairs.

== Gameplay ==
=== Round 1 (both versions) ===
Three two-member teams competed. Each team chose one member to play the question and answer format of the game, while the other went offstage. At this point, the host showed distorted pictures to the players, each of which became more clear as time progressed. The first player to buzz in and identify the picture won ten points and a chance to answer a question about the picture for five additional points. The first two teams to reach 50 points won the right to enter the maze, with the first team doing so earning the right to decide who went into the maze first. After one team reached 50 points, the other teams played out the rest of the round, but without bonus questions. In the speed round, if a player buzzed in and was incorrect or unable to identify the picture, the host read a clue to the opponent without further revealing the picture.

Before being allowed to enter the maze, the runner was briefed on the maze's layout by the "Lady of the Maze". In the Roth season this was simply the face of an older woman (played by Renae Jacobs); in the Lopez season, the likeness of a younger redhead woman appeared with a high-pitched voice (played by Clea Montville). The "Lady of the Maze" also appeared again when the runner had reached the halfway point.

In the earliest episodes, the players were given 10 seconds for each picture, which grew clearer as time passed, and the first person to buzz-in and identify the picture won one point for each second left on the clock, and an opportunity to answer the question about the picture to double the points. When one player earned 50 points or more and the right to enter the maze, the other players played more pictures without the clock, at 10 points per picture, until another player reached 50 points.

=== Maze ===
==== Roth version ====
The maze had three sections: the Mirror Maze, the Honeycomb Maze, and the Chamber of Knowledge. The person that answered the questions in the first part of the game was also the one responsible for running through the maze, with their team partner guiding them through the maze by moving a giant joystick. This device controlled a computerized voice telling the contestant which direction to go, and triggered rumble devices on the outfit the runner wore as an additional directional aid. The joystick also had a button that controlled the runner's laser which was used in various parts of the game.

The first section was called the Mirror Maze. In this section, the contestant navigated a series of mirrors. Once the runner reached the end of the Mirror Maze, the "Mirror Man" blocked the path, not moving unless the runner correctly answered a question posed by Roth. A correct answer meant that the runner passed, while an incorrect answer or pass meant that the runner was asked another question. A contestant missing three questions had to wait five more seconds before being allowed to proceed.

Once the runner had passed the Mirror Maze, the runner had to find two of several Power Sticks that were hidden in the mountains between the Mirror Maze and the Honeycomb Maze. Occasionally there was a Power Stick hidden in the Mirror Maze itself. Once the runner found two, they entered the Honeycomb Maze. In this section, the runner had to lower their visor and rely on the partner to guide them through the network of doors and walls.

Once through the Honeycomb Maze, the runner raised the visor and entered a small briefing room. Here, the Lady of the Maze reappeared to give the runner instructions on what to do inside the Chamber of Knowledge, which the runner entered using one of the two Power Sticks.

Inside the Chamber of Knowledge, the runner was asked three different true-or-false questions by three of the six different guardians. A correct answer caused one of the three gates blocking the way out to open. If the runner answered incorrectly, the same guardian asked another true-or-false question. If the runner missed this question, one more true-or-false question was asked. If the runner missed all three, the gate automatically opened after five seconds. Once all three gates were open, the runner exited the chamber (and the maze itself) by inserting his/her remaining power stick into a holder at the finish line to stop the clock.

The first team set the time that their opponents had to beat. The second team then entered the maze, and had the amount of time established by the first team to make their way through. If the second team ran out of time, an alarm went off, the game ended immediately, and the first team won. If the second team made it out before time ran out, they won the game. The winners of this version also won prizes and the right to play a bonus round.

===== Chamber of Knowledge Guardians (Season 1) =====
- The Guardian of the Gate of History (asked questions about American history; represented by an old Native American woman's head)
- The Guardian of the Gate of Fantasy (asked questions about story books, fairy tales, and nursery rhymes; represented by a dinosaur's head)
- The Guardian of the Gate of the Animal Kingdom (asked questions about animals; represented by a lion's head)
- The Guardian of the Gate of the Unexpected (asked questions about pop culture; represented to look like an elf or somewhat of a Star Trek character; would return in Season 2 as the Guardian of the Gate of Education)
- The Guardian of the Gate of Nature (asked questions concerning all forms of nature excluding animals; represented by a face that looked to be modeled after wind)
- The Guardian of the Gate of Innovation (asked questions about science; voice usually sounded like a man, but sometimes a woman; represented by a head in a compass)

===== Prize Mountain =====
The quickest team in this version of the show won the right to play a special bonus round, which featured a mountain with five television monitors that constantly altered between a "Prize" screen (depicting a diamond over a green backdrop) and a "No Prize" screen (depicting the Mirror Man's face over a white backdrop). The runner faced the first TV on the mountain and shouted for the partner to fire the laser. If the team stopped at least three of the five monitors on "Prize" (before the team stopped at three monitors on "No Prize", which ended the game immediately), they won a $500 shopping spree at the Sharper Image in Beverly Hills.

==== Lopez version ====
Contestants now shot the picture using their laser podium before taking a guess. Another change featured a special bonus picture at one point in the game in which five bonus points were added to the initial value, making it worth 15 points.

The maze was extended and featured new obstacles. Its four sections were the Mirror Maze, the Ice Cave, the Chamber of Knowledge, and Lightning Mountain (which consisted of the same set as the first season's Prize Mountain).

The run to find the power stick was removed from this part of the game, the Mirror Man's question was posed by the Mirror Man himself, and his face was larger than in the prior season. If a contestant gave a wrong answer or ran out of time to answer, another question was read. A runner failing to answer that question correctly had to wait at least three seconds before proceeding.

Once the runner arrived at the entrance to the Ice Cave, the Lady of The Maze showed the runner a distorted picture on a monitor. A runner identifying it within five seconds took the shorter path through the cave, but otherwise had to take the longer path. In either case, the runner was required to lower the visor before entering the Ice Cave. While navigating the cave, the runner had to find a Power Stick. In addition, the contestant also had to avoid kicking two groups of sensors and Mirror Man placards that were placed on the cave floor. If the runner touched one of these objects, several large icicles descended from the cave ceiling, blocking the runner's path. Upon finding the Power Stick and getting through the Ice Cave, the player lifted their visor and enter the Chamber of Knowledge.

There were only four guardians in this portion of the maze, and only one correct answer was required to exit. If the answer was incorrect, the runner had to answer another true-or-false question, and if the player missed that one, a five-second penalty was assessed before the gates unlocked.

The runner faced a single television monitor at the base of Lightning Mountain with faces of the Mirror Man flying on it. The runner had to blast two of these images with their laser before being allowed to run up the mountain and stop the clock. As in the first season, the first team set the time, the second team had to beat it, and the second team was not allowed to finish their maze run if their time exceeded the first team's time. The bonus round was removed. The team that won the game automatically won the $500 shopping spree for the runner and the prizes for the navigator.

===== Chamber of Knowledge Guardians (Season 2) =====
- The Guardian of the Gate of Education (gave school-related questions; formerly the Guardian of the Gate of the Unexpected in Season 1)
- The Guardian of the Gate of Imagination (asked questions about pop culture and other miscellaneous facts)
- The Guardian of the Gate of the Natural World (gave questions about nature; represented by a lion's head with a unicorn's horn)
- The Guardian of the Gate of Science and Discovery (gave questions about science and technology; represented by a robot's head)
