= Daniel Roebuck =

American actor, director, writer and producer

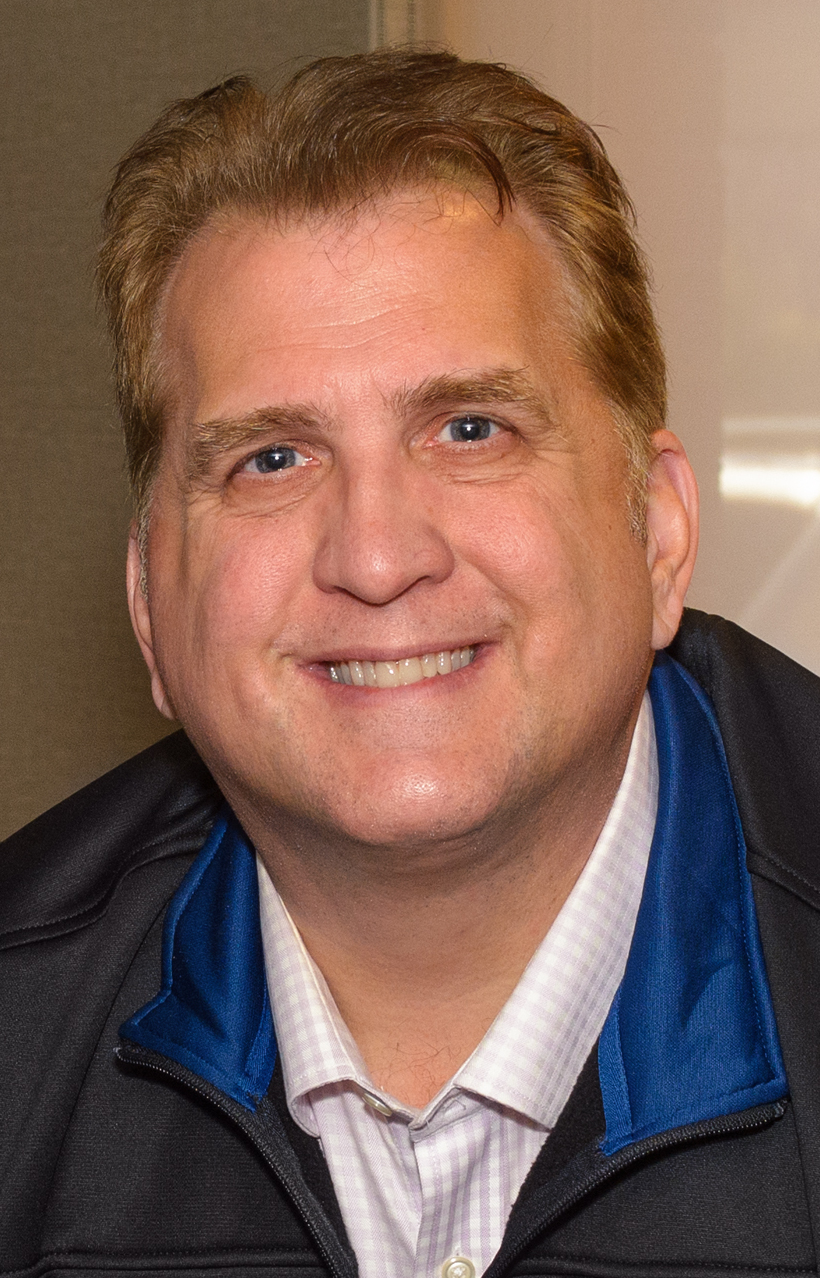
- Roebuck in 2017
- Born: Daniel James Roebuck; March 4, 1963 (age 63); Bethlehem, Pennsylvania, U.S.
- Occupations: Actor; writer
- Years active: 1981–present
- Spouses: Leslie Roebuck (m. 1983; div. 1987); Kelly Roebuck (m. 1994; div. 2013); Tammy Roebuck (m. 2015)
- Children: 2

Daniel James Roebuck (born March 4, 1963) is an American actor and writer. In film, he is known for his roles as Samson 'John' Tollet in River's Edge (1986), Deputy Marshal Robert Biggs in The Fugitive (1993) and its spin-off U.S. Marshals (1998), and Mr. Banks in Agent Cody Banks (2003) and its sequel Agent Cody Banks 2: Destination London (2004).

He has appeared in most Rob Zombie films, including as Morris Green in The Devil's Rejects (2005), The Haunted World of El Superbeasto (2009), and 3 from Hell (2019); Lou 'Big Lou' Martini in Halloween (2007), and Halloween II (2009); Pastor Victor in 31 (2016); and The Count in The Munsters (2022). Roebuck has also worked with director and producer Don Coscarelli, appearing in Bubba Ho-Tep (2002), John Dies at the End (2012), and Phantasm: Ravager (2016).

On television, Roebuck is known for his role as Cliff Lewis, Ben Matlock (Andy Griffith)'s junior partner, on the TV series Matlock (1992–1995); Officer (then ex-officer) Rick Bettina, on the TV series Nash Bridges (1996–2001); Jay Leno in the made-for-television film The Late Shift (1996); and Dr. Leslie Arzt in the series Lost (2004–2010). Roebuck has provided voice roles in video games, voicing Mark Bishop in L.A. Noire, Gary Finkel in Dead Rising 3, and Greez Dritus in both Star Wars Jedi: Fallen Order and Star Wars Jedi: Survivor.

== Early life and education ==
Roebuck was born in Bethlehem, Pennsylvania, on March 4, 1963. He graduated from Bethlehem Catholic High School in Bethlehem in 1981. Roebuck is a devout Catholic.

== Career ==
Roebuck appeared in his first film role in 1985, the lead in Cavegirl, and went on to appear in such films as River's Edge (1986) and Dudes (1987). From 1992 to 1995, he played Ben Matlock (Andy Griffith)'s assistant lawyer and penultimate private investigator, Cliff Lewis, on the television drama Matlock, and from 1996 to 2001, he also had a recurring role as a corrupt officer, Insp. Rick Bettina, in Nash Bridges. He played the role of US Marshal Bob Biggs in The Fugitive (1993) and its 1998 spin-off U.S. Marshals.

In 1996, Roebuck portrayed Jay Leno in the HBO made-for-TV film The Late Shift. Leno has often commented positively on Roebuck's performance whenever a guest would bring up the film on The Tonight Show with Jay Leno. In 1999, Roebuck guest starred in The King of Queens episode "Court Date", as Jeffrey the cop, whom lead character Carrie Heffernan (Leah Remini) tried to date in order to get out of a traffic ticket. He appeared as FBI Agent Weine in the horror film Final Destination (2000). In 2001, Roebuck played Petty Officer Dale Mortensen in the made-for-TV film A Glimpse of Hell, which explores the 1989 USS Iowa explosion. In 2002, he played a hearse driver in the comedy horror film Bubba Ho-Tep, and played the part of Mr. Banks in the film Agent Cody Banks (2003) and its 2004 sequel Agent Cody Banks 2: Destination London. He appeared in the 2006 film Red Riding Hood.

From 2005 until 2010, Roebuck had a recurring role in the television drama Lost, appearing as Dr. Leslie Arzt in nine episodes. Roebuck is a regular player in films by Rob Zombie, starting with The Devil's Rejects (2005), as Morris Green. He has been a writer and producer for the Monsterama series, appearing in some of the episodes. Roebuck starred in the Disney Channel Original Movie Quints (2000), as well as the Nickelodeon original film, Shredderman Rules (2007). In the series Sonny with a Chance, he played Mr. Condor. He guest starred in Disney's Wizards of Waverly Place. In 2009, Roebuck guest starred in the fan-produced web series Star Trek: The Continuing Mission.

Roebuck has guest starred on one episode each of Dark Blue and Bones. After reuniting with Rob Zombie when playing Lou 'Big Lou' Martini in Halloween (2007), and Halloween II (2009), Roebuck reprised his role of the Zombie character Morris Green, providing his voice in the animated film The Haunted World of El Superbeasto (2009). He also starred in the films A Fork in the Road (2009) and That's What I Am (2011). Roebuck portrayed Dave Karofsky (Max Adler)'s father Paul in the TV series Glee's second season episodes "Furt" and "Born This Way", with a brief cameo appearance in the third season episode "On My Way".

Roebuck played Largeman in the 2012 comedy horror film John Dies at the End. In October 2012, Roebuck played B.J. in AMC's The Walking Dead: Cold Storage webisodes. In November 2015, he played Arnold Walker in The Man in the High Castle. He appeared in five of ten episodes in the first season, distributed through Amazon Prime. He starred as Pastor Victor in the 2016 Rob Zombie film 31, and played Demeter in the 2016 horror film Phantasm: Ravager. In 2019, he again reprised the Morris Green character in the Rob Zombie film 3 from Hell.

As of 2022, Roebuck is host of Classic with Daniel Roebuck on New Evangelization Television in the New York metropolitan area. In 2022, he was cast to play the part of The Count, or Grandpa Munster, in the 2022 Rob Zombie-directed film The Munsters, based on the 1960s sitcom of the same name The Munsters.

== Personal life ==
Roebuck is a Catholic. In 2020, he and his wife Tammy founded A Channel of Peace, a non-profit organization that produces Christian films.

== Filmography ==
=== Film ===
| Year | Title | Role | Notes |
|---|---|---|---|
| 1985 | Cavegirl | Rex | |
| 1986 | River's Edge | Samson 'John' Tollet | |
| 1987 | Dudes | Biscuit | |
| 1987 | Project X | Hadfield | |
| 1989 | Disorganized Crime | Detective Bill Lonigan | |
| 1992 | Eddie Presley | Keystone The Magnificent | |
| 1992 | Only You | Marty | |
| 1993 | The Fugitive | Deputy U.S. Marshal Bobby Biggs | |
| 1996 | Driven | Dale Schneider | |
| 1997 | Money Talks | Detective Williams | |
| 1998 | U.S. Marshals | Deputy Marshal Bobby Biggs | |
| 2000 | Final Destination | Agent Weine | |
| 2002 | We Were Soldiers | Medevac Commanding Officer | |
| 2002 | Bubba Ho-Tep | Hearse Driver #1 | |
| 2002 | Hansel and Gretel | Dad | |
| 2003 | Agent Cody Banks | Mr. Banks | |
| 2004 | Agent Cody Banks 2: Destination London | Mr. Banks | |
| 2005 | The Devil's Rejects | Morris Green | |
| 2006 | Goolians | Dan | |
| 2007 | Halloween | Lou 'Big Lou' Martini | |
| 2008 | Flash of Genius | Frank Sertin | |
| 2009 | Dark and Stormy Night | '8 O'Clock' Faraday | |
| 2009 | The Haunted World of El Superbeasto | Morris Green (voice) | |
| 2009 | Halloween II | Lou 'Big Lou' Martini | |
| 2011 | That's What I Am | Jim Nichol | |
| 2011 | Night Club | Frank | |
| 2011 | InSight | Sergeant Reed | |
| 2012 | John Dies at the End | Largeman | |
| 2013 | Compound Fracture | Jim | |
| 2013 | Dr. Shocker's Vault of Horror | Dr. Shocker | |
| 2015 | Soaked in Bleach | Tom Grant | |
| 2015 | It's a Frame-Up! | Edgar Kennedy | Short |
| 2015 | Schmo Boat | The Heckler | Short |
| 2016 | Phantasm: Ravager | Demeter | |
| 2016 | 31 | Pastor Victor | |
| 2016 | His Neighbor Phil | Harvey | |
| 2017 | Let There Be Light | Norm | |
| 2019 | 3 from Hell | Morris Green | |
| 2020 | Penance Lane | Sheriff Denny Wilson | |
| 2020 | My Brothers' Crossing | J.T. Clark | |
| 2022 | The Munsters | The Count / Ezra Mosher | |
| 2023 | Miracle at Manchester | Ed Hanson | |
| 2024 | Stream | Howard | |
| 2024 | Saint Nick of Bethlehem | Santa Clause / Saint Nick | |
| 2024 | Terrifier 3 | Santa Claus/Charlie | |
| 2024 | House on Haunted Hill | Vinny Price | |
| 2025 | Attack of the Killer Tomatoes: Organic Intelligence | | |

=== Television ===
| Year | Title | Role | Notes |
|---|---|---|---|
| 1986 | The Love Boat | S.C.U. Lambda | Episode: "The Shipshape Cruise/Save the Prince/The Bermuda Triangle" |
| 1987–1995 | Matlock | Cliff Lewis/Various roles | 55 episodes |
| 1988 | The Dirty Dozen | Irwin Moskowitz | Episode: "Danko's Dozen" |
| 1990 | Capital News | Haskell Epstein | 13 episodes |
| 1991 | The Killing Mind | Dennis Jepson | Television film |
| 1991 | Lookwell | Cop | Episode: "Pilot" |
| 1991 | Star Trek: The Next Generation | Jaron | 2 episodes |
| 1991 | Palace Guard | Ernest Lyle | Episode: "Memories" |
| 1992 | Quantum Leap | Neil Lindhurst | Episode: "The Play's the Thing" |
| 1992 | Dark Justice | Max | Episode: "Prime Cuts" |
| 1995 | Moment of Truth: Caught in the Crossfire | Randy Wood | Television film |
| 1995 | The Late Shift | Jay Leno | Television film |
| 1996 | Lois & Clark: The New Adventures of Superman | Herkimer Johnson | Episode "Oedipus Wrecks" |
| 1996 | Abducted: A Father's Love | Johnny | Television film |
| 1996 | The Cold Equations | Mitch | Television film |
| 1996–2000 | Nash Bridges | Inspector Rick Bettina | 14 episodes |
| 1997 | The Pretender | Daniel Carlson | Episode "Bomb Squad" |
| 1997 | Spy Game | Anthony J. Poll | Episode: "Lorne and Max Drop the Ball" |
| 1998 | George & Leo | Danny | Episode: "The Massage: Part 2" |
| 1998 | V.I.P. | Iron Green | Episode: "Beats Working at a Hot Dog Stand" |
| 1998 | Vengeance Unlimited | William Hargess | Episode: "Cruel and Unusual" |
| 1998 | Buddy Faro | Rex Nardo | Episode: "Ain't That a Kick in the Head" |
| 1999 | The King of Queens | Officer Jeffrey | Episode: "Court Date" |
| 2000 | Early Edition | Michael Fielding | Episode: "Gifted" |
| 2000 | Martial Law | Waldo | Episode: "The Thrill is Gone" |
| 2000 | Hollywood Off-Ramp | Gabriel Briggs | Episode: "Big Screen" |
| 2000 | Quints | Jim Grover | Television film |
| 2000 | The Drew Carey Show | Mr. Grayson | Episode: "Drew's Inheritance" |
| 2000 | The West Wing | Lieutenant Buckley | Episode: "And It's Surely to Their Credit" |
| 2000 | Family Law | Bruce | Episode: "Generations" |
| 2000–2001 | The Invisible Man | Agent Norman Miller | 2 episodes |
| 2001 | FreakyLinks | Stu Carmichael | Episode: "Subject: The Harbingers" |
| 2001 | Boston Public | Orchestra Man | Episode: "Chapter Fifteen" |
| 2001 | A Mother's Testimony | Police Officer | Television film |
| 2001 | A Glimpse of Hell | Petty Officer Dale Mortensen | Television film |
| 2001 | Crossing Jordan | George Falk | Episode: "Believers" |
| 2001 | The Parkers | Producer | Episode: "Family Ties and Lies" |
| 2001 | Any Day Now | Father Michael | Episode: "Still My Little Shoulder" |
| 2002 | NYPD Blue | Dave Burgess | Episode: "Oedipus Wrecked" |
| 2002 | Judging Amy | Alvin Twycoff | 2 episodes |
| 2002 | Six Feet Under | Sex Addict | Episode: "The Last Time" |
| 2002 | Malcolm in the Middle | Randy | Episode: "Zoo" |
| 2002 | Windfall | Packard | Television film |
| 2002 | Mary Christmas | Mac Reeves | Television film |
| 2003 | Becker | Mr. Stoler | Episode: "The Pain in the Neck" |
| 2003 | The District | Officer | Episode: "Bloodlines" |
| 2003 | Behind the Camera: The Unauthorized Story of Three's Company | Ted Bergmann | Television film |
| 2003 | The Division | Ronald Crenshaw | Episode: "Diagnosis" |
| 2003 | Miracle Dogs | Dr. Elliot | Television film |
| 2003 | ER | Kyle Martin | Episode: "Out of Africa" |
| 2003–2004 | A Minute with Stan Hooper | Pete Peterson | 13 episodes |
| 2004 | Blowing Smoke | Ray | Television film |
| 2004 | Monsterama | Mr. Shocker | Television film |
| 2005 | Confessions of a Sociopathic Social Climber | Alex | Television film |
| 2005 | Behind the Camera: The Unauthorized Story of Mork & Mindy | Garry Marshall | Television film |
| 2005 | Cold Case | Butch Beard | Episode: "Kensington" |
| 2005 | Murder at the Presidio | Major Dawson | Television film |
| 2005 | American Black Beauty | Doc Chavez | Television film |
| 2005 | Monk | Larry Zwibell | Episode: "Mr. Monk Gets Drunk" |
| 2005 | Desperate Housewives | Mr. Flannery | Episode: "You Could Drive a Person Crazy" |
| 2005 | Law & Order | Nathaniel Prentiss | Episode: "New York Minute" |
| 2005–2010 | Lost | Dr. Leslie Arzt | 9 episodes |
| 2006 | NCIS | Matthew Lake | Episode: "Boxed in" |
| 2006 | Boston Legal | Russell Blayney | Episode: "Shock and Oww" |
| 2006 | Ghost Whisperer | Adam Emerson | Episode: "The Vanishing" |
| 2006 | The Closer | Alan Roth | Episode: "To Protect & to Serve" |
| 2006 | Close to Home | Big Freddy Wade | Episode: "Homecoming" |
| 2006–2013 | CSI: Crime Scene Investigation | Frank Rosetti/Fred Paulsen | 2 episodes |
| 2007 | Without a Trace | August Black | Episode: "Eating Away" |
| 2007 | A Family Lost | Steve Walsh | Television film |
| 2007 | Shredderman Rules | Bob Bixby | Television film |
| 2007 | K-Ville | Arnie Canseco | Episode: "No Good Deed" |
| 2007 | Lost: Missing Pieces | Dr. Leslie Arzt | 2 episodes |
| 2008 | Bones | George Francis | Episode: "Player Under Pressure" |
| 2008 | Eleventh Hour | Principal Craig | Episode: "Cardiac" |
| 2009 | Dark Blue | Paul Tivnan | Episode: "Ice" |
| 2009 | Wizards of Waverly Place | Mr. Evans | Episode: "Halloween" |
| 2009 | Woke Up Dead | Shadow Man | 14 episodes |
| 2009 | The New Adventures of Old Christine | Josh | Episode: "It's Beginning to Stink a Lot Like Christmas" |
| 2009–2010 | Sonny with a Chance | Mr. Condor | 5 episodes |
| 2010 | Crafty | Phil Sheridan | Episode: "Don't Tell Mom the Babysitter's Baked" |
| 2010 | CSI: Miami | Mark Bullock | Episode: "Getting Axed" |
| 2010 | Star Trek: The Continuing Mission | Admiral Rowan | Episode: "We Will Control All That You See And Hear" |
| 2010–2012 | Glee | Paul Karofsky | 3 episodes |
| 2011 | Big Love | Jeff | Episode: "The Oath" |
| 2011 | The Mentalist | Detective Wade | Episode: "Scarlet Ribbons" |
| 2011–2015 | Grimm | Lt. Peter Orson | 2 episodes |
| 2012 | Hot in Cleveland | Perkins | Episode: "Two Girls & a Rhino" |
| 2012 | Weeds | Detective Jensen | 2 episodes |
| 2012 | The Walking Dead: Cold Storage | B.J. | 4 episodes |
| 2012 | Castle | Joe Silva | Episode: "Swan Song" |
| 2012 | Everyone Wants Theirs | George Charlie | Episode: "The Levels of Resurrection" |
| 2013 | CSI: NY | Ray Tortucci | Episode: "White Gold" |
| 2013 | Crash & Bernstein | Ed | Episode: "Crash vs Flex" |
| 2013 | Vegas | Teddy Brown | Episode: "Scoundrels" |
| 2013 | King & Maxwell | Hamilton G. Skales | Episode: "Job Security" |
| 2013 | See Dad Run | Bill | Episode: "See Dad Dance Around the Truth" |
| 2013 | Mob City | Nick Bledsoe | 6 episodes |
| 2014 | Franklin & Bash | Dewey Barber | Episode: "Good Cop/Bad Cop" |
| 2014 | Mrs. Gary | Detective | Episode: "Stiletto, "C" Clamp and Ed Braxton's Fly" |
| 2014 | NCIS: Los Angeles | Paul Barnes | Episode: "The Grey Man" |
| 2014 | Grumpy Cat's Worst Christmas Ever | George | Television film |
| 2015 | Major Crimes | Sgt. Staples | Episode: "Internal Affairs" |
| 2015 | Transformers: Robots in Disguise | Malodor (voice) | Episode: "Out of Focus" |
| 2015 | Agents of S.H.I.E.L.D. | John Donnelly | Episode: "A Wanted (Inhu)man" |
| 2015 | Fresh Off the Boat | Glenn | Episode: "Huangsgiving" |
| 2015–2016 | The Man in the High Castle | Arnold Walker | 10 episodes |
| 2016 | Criminal Minds | Mike Thompson | Episode: "Hostage" |
| 2016 | Jane the Virgin | Michael Cordero Sr. | Episode: "Chapter Thirty-Seven" |
| 2016 | Mistresses | Stu Salzman | Episode: "Fight or Flight" |
| 2016 | Rosewood | Ernie Portnoy | Episode: "Half-Life & Havana Nights" |
| 2016 | 12 Deadly Days | Wilbur | Episode: "Nuts A' Cracking" |
| 2017 | New York Prison Break: The Seduction of Joyce Mitchell | Lyle Mitchell | Television film |
| 2018–2024 | 9-1-1 | Norman Peterson | 5 episodes |
| 2020 | Collector's Call | Himself | Episode: "Meet Daniel Roebuck" |
| 2024 | NCIS: Origins | Artie | 2 episodes |
| 2024–2025 | Svengoolie | Himself/Santa Claus/Man at the Door | 3 episodes |

=== Video games ===
| Year | Title | Role |
|---|---|---|
| 2011 | L.A. Noire | Mark Bishop |
| 2013 | Dead Rising 3 | Gary Finkel |
| 2019 | Star Wars Jedi: Fallen Order | Greez Dritus |
| 2021 | American Hero | Hoover |
| 2023 | Star Wars Jedi: Survivor | Greez Dritus |
