= His Neighbor Phil =

- Directed by: Simon Erickson; Scott R. Thompson
- Screenplay by: Scott R. Thompson
- Produced by: Bill Holmes Jr. Daniel Roebuck; Scott R. Thompson
- Starring: Stephanie Zimbalist; Daniel Roebuck
- Cinematography: Jacob Moyer
- Release date: January 29, 2016 (Trail Dance Film Festival)
- Running time: 89 minutes
- Country: United States
- Language: English

His Neighbor Phil is a 2016 American independent comedy-drama film directed by Simon Erickson and Scott R. Thompson and starring Stephanie Zimbalist and Daniel Roebuck (who also served as producer).

== Cast ==
- Stephanie Zimbalist as Mary
- Daniel Roebuck as Harvey
- Ellen Dolan as Charlie
- Sally Kellerman as Bernadette
- Kristi Knudson as Isabel
- Rachel Storey as Irene
- Bob Bird as Phil
- Sue Johnson Flemke as Connie
- Ronda Anderson-Sand as Claudia
- Arlen Daleske as Jason
