= Caroline? =

1990 American made-for-television film

- VHS cover
- Genre: Drama
- Based on: Father's Arcane Daughter by E. L. Konigsburg
- Screenplay by: Michael de Guzman
- Directed by: Joseph Sargent
- Starring: Stephanie Zimbalist; Pamela Reed; George Grizzard; Patricia Neal; Dorothy McGuire
- Theme music composer: Charles Bernstein
- Country of origin: United States
- Original language: English

Production
- Executive producers: Les Alexander; Dan Enright; Don Enright
- Producer: Dorothea G. Petrie
- Production location: Atlanta, Georgia
- Cinematography: William Wages
- Editor: Paul LaMastra
- Running time: 98 min
- Production company: Hallmark Hall of Fame

Original release
- Network: CBS
- Release: April 29, 1990

Caroline? is a 1990 American made-for-television drama film based on E. L. Konigsburg's novel Father's Arcane Daughter starring Stephanie Zimbalist, Pamela Reed and George Grizzard. The film is directed by Joseph Sargent and aired on CBS on April 29, 1990, part of the Hallmark Hall of Fame anthology series. The film won three Primetime Emmy Awards.

== Plot ==
Caroline, a woman presumed dead for 15 years, returns to her family shortly before a large inheritance is due. While Caroline certainly seems to be the missing woman, there are doubts about her identity among those who knew her. The truth, her motivations for what she has done, and the results she accomplished are heart-warming.

== Cast ==
- Stephanie Zimbalist as Caroline Carmichael
- Pamela Reed as Grace Carmichael
- George Grizzard as Paul Carmichael
- Patricia Neal as Miss Trollope
- Dorothy McGuire as Flora Atkins
- Shawn Phelan as Winston Carmichael
- Jenny Jacobs as Heidi Carmichael
- John Evans as Winston as Adult
- John Bennes as Simmons

== Primetime Emmy Awards ==
- Outstanding Made for Television Movie (won - tied with The Incident)
- Outstanding Directing for a Miniseries or Special (Joseph Sargent) (won)
- Outstanding Editing for a Miniseries or Special — Single Camera Production (Paul LaMastra) (won)
