= Judy Blume bibliography =

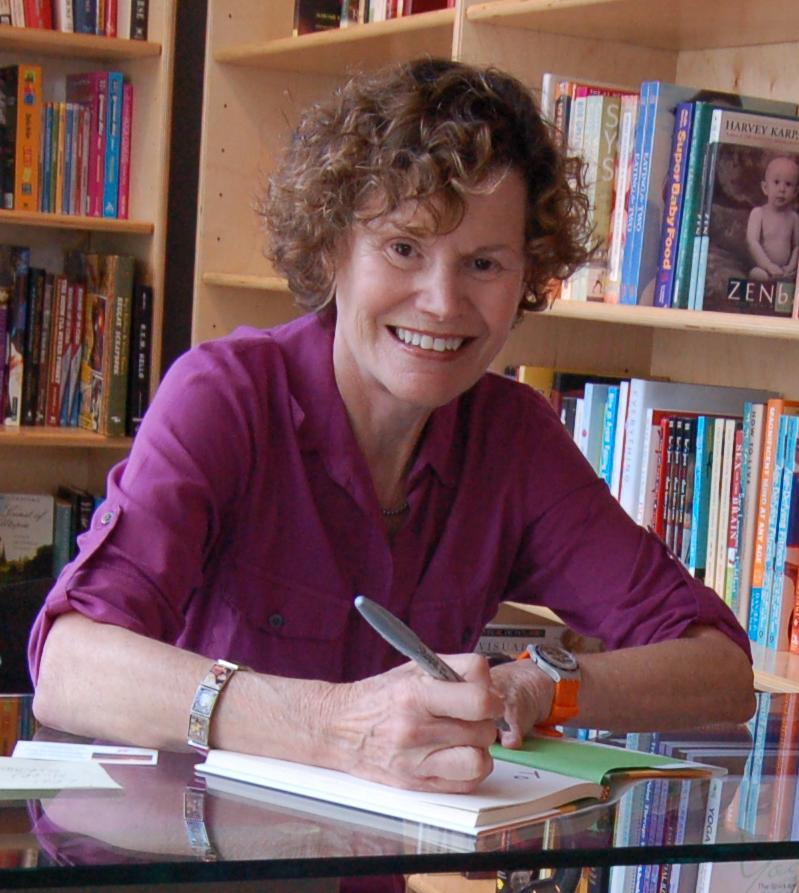
Judy Blume in 2009

Judy Blume is an American author. She has written for a variety of audiences, switching between works for younger and older readers. Her young adult literature is discussed for its direct handling of topics like puberty and adolescent sexuality, which has made her books the subject of regular censorship. Several of Blume's works have been adapted to film and television.

Blume is known for her middle grade and young adult literature. Her first major following came from Are You There God? It's Me, Margaret. (1970), which dealt with female puberty. This was followed by Then Again, Maybe I Won't (1971) about male puberty. She wrote several more pre-teen novels in the 1970s: Iggie's House (1970) about racism, It's Not the End of the World (1972) about divorce, Deenie (1973) about parental expectations, Blubber (1974) about bullying, Forever... (1975) about premarital sex, and Starring Sally J. Freedman as Herself (1977) about fear of death. She later wrote Tiger Eyes (1981) about the death of a parent, Just as Long as We're Together (1987) about divorce and emotional eating, and its sequel Here's to You, Rachel Robinson (1993) about overachievement.

For children, Blume wrote the Fudge series: Tales of a Fourth Grade Nothing (1971), Superfudge (1980), Fudge-a-Mania (1990), Double Fudge (2002), and the spinoff book Otherwise Known as Sheila the Great (1972). She also wrote the children's book Freckle Juice (1971). Blume wrote the picture books The One in the Middle Is the Green Kangaroo (1969) and The Pain and the Great One (1984), and between 2007 and 2009, she wrote a series of four children's books using the characters from The Pain and the Great One. She published The Judy Blume Diary (1981) and The Judy Blume Memory Book (1988) for children to write in.

Blume has written four books targeted for adults: Wifey (1978), Smart Women (1983), Summer Sisters (1998), and In the Unlikely Event (2015). Her book Letters to Judy: What Kids Wish They Could Tell You (1986) was targeted for parents, compiled using letters from readers so parents could learn how children engaged with the topics in Blume's books. She compiled stories from frequently-censored writers to publish the anthology book Places I Never Meant to Be (1999).

== Fiction ==
=== Children's fiction ===
- The One in the Middle Is the Green Kangaroo (1969) (ISBN 978-0-8092-8659-1)
  - Freddy is a middle child who feels neglected but gets a role in a school play. Blume's first book was a picture book.
- Iggie's House (1970) (ISBN 978-0-87888-017-1)
  - A Black family faces racism after moving into a predominantly white neighborhood in the suburbs. Blume wrote the book after seeing several white people have negative reactions toward the civil rights movement and the ghetto riots.
- Are You There God? It's Me, Margaret. (1970) (ISBN 978-0-88103-172-0)
  - Margaret Simon is a pre-teen girl who is worried about puberty and is trying to find an identity through religion. Blume wrote the book after reflecting on her own experiences as a 12-year-old.
- Then Again, Maybe I Won't (1971) (ISBN 978-0-8479-1543-9)
  - Tony Miglione is a 13-year-old boy whose family becomes wealthy, and he must learn to navigate a new social class as he goes through puberty. Blume wrote the book as a male counterpart to the female exploration of puberty in her previous book.
- Freckle Juice (1971) (ISBN 978-0-88103-179-9)
  - Andrew is a second grader who wants freckles like his friend has, so he is tricked by another student into buying a fictional recipe for freckle juice.
- Tales of a Fourth Grade Nothing (1972) (ISBN 978-0-425-19379-2)
  - Peter Hatcher is a fourth-grade boy who is annoyed by his attention-seeking brother Fudge. Blume originally wrote the book as a short story where Fudge ate Peter's pet turtle, but her publisher convinced her to include this as one part of a longer children's novel.
- Otherwise Known as Sheila the Great (1972) (ISBN 978-1-4395-1961-5)
  - Sheila Tubman is a young girl who tries to hide that she is afraid of dogs and swimming. The character was originally introduced as Peter Hatcher's neighbor in Tales of a Fourth Grade Nothing, and her popularity led to Blume writing a separate book about her.
- It's Not the End of the World (1972) (ISBN 978-0-440-94140-8)
  - Karen Newman is a sixth-grade girl who fears her parents will divorce after they decide to separate. Blume wrote the book when divorce was becoming more common and accepted by American society, and it reflected her own marital trouble at the time.
- Deenie (1973) (ISBN 978-0-87888-061-4)
  - Deenie is a teenage girl who wants to become a model until she is diagnosed with the spine disorder scoliosis and must wear a brace, only for Deenie's mother to make her feel that she no longer meets her expectations.
- Blubber (1974) (ISBN 978-0-440-40707-2)
  - Jill is a girl who watches as another student is being bullied and then becomes a victim herself. The character is based on Blume's daughter Randy, who told her mother about frequent bullying that took place at her school.
- Forever... (1975) (ISBN 978-0-02-711030-2)
  - Michael and Katherine are a couple who decide to have sexual intercourse and take measures to ensure they do so responsibly. Blume wrote the book on the advice of her teenaged daughter, who felt that teenage stories about premarital sex treated the experience as a negative thing.
- Starring Sally J. Freedman as Herself (1977) (ISBN 978-0-440-48253-6)
  - Sally J. Freedman is a 10-year-old girl who is concerned about things like war and death. The book is loosely autobiographical, taking place in the years after World War II when Blume lived in Florida.
- Superfudge (1980) (ISBN 978-0-525-40522-1)
  - In the sequel to Tales of a Fourth Grade Nothing, Peter and Fudge Hatcher get a younger sibling.
- Tiger Eyes (1981) (ISBN 978-0-87888-185-7)
  - Davey is a teenage girl whose father is killed in a robbery. Blume originally wrote the book as a screenplay, but she reworked it as a novel after the project's producers rejected it.
- The Pain and the Great One (1984) (ISBN 978-0-02-711100-2)
  - Jake the Pain and Abigail the Great One are brother and sister with a sibling rivalry. The book was a picture book based on a poem about her children she had written at the beginning of her career.
- Just as Long as We're Together (1987) (ISBN 978-0-440-40075-2)
  - Stephanie is a 13-year-old girl who begins overeating in response to her parents' divorce.
- Fudge-a-Mania (1990) (ISBN 978-0-7587-0013-1)
  - In the sequel to Superfudge, the Hatcher family moves in with Sheila Tubman's family and Fudge Hatcher develops a crush on Sheila. Blume wrote the book after working on the film adaptation of Otherwise Known as Sheila the Great, which made her want to revisit the characters.
- Here's to You, Rachel Robinson (1993) (ISBN 978-0-440-21974-3)
  - The sequel to Just as Long as We're Together follows Stephanie's friend Rachel, who feels that her perfectionism and over-achievement is making her life more difficult.
- Double Fudge (2002) (ISBN 978-0-525-42388-1)
  - In the fourth of Blume's Fudge books, the Hatcher family reunites with their cousins from Hawaii.
- Soupy Saturdays with the Pain and the Great One (2007) (ISBN 978-0-385-73305-2)
  - A series of short stories featuring the Pain and the Great One. The characters were adapted from Blume's picture book about sibling rivalry, The Pain and the Great One.
- Cool Zone with the Pain and the Great One (2008) (ISBN 978-0-385-73306-9)
  - The Pain and the Great One work together to confront various problems they have at school.
- Going, Going, Gone! with the Pain and the Great One (2008) (ISBN 978-0-385-73307-6)
  - The Pain and the Great One face troubles in different places including the mall, the fair, and the emergency room.
- Friend or Fiend? with the Pain and the Great One (2009) (ISBN 978-0-230-70029-1)
  - The Pain and the Great One face new problems and they hold a birthday party for their cat.

=== Adult fiction ===
- Wifey (1978) (ISBN 978-0-399-12241-5)
  - Sandy Pressman is a wife who is unhappy with her life and marriage. Blume took the themes of the story from the life she lived before she became a writer, as well as her dissatisfaction with her first marriage and her then-current second marriage.
- Smart Women (1983) (ISBN 978-0-399-12840-0)
  - Margo and B.B. are divorced middle aged women who are friends until Margo begins dating B.B.'s ex-husband.
- Summer Sisters (1998) (ISBN 978-0-385-32405-2)
  - Caitlin and Vix are teenage girls who grow up on Martha's Vineyard and have to maintain their friendship as they have relationship troubles in adulthood.
- In the Unlikely Event (2015) (ISBN 978-1-101-87504-9)
  - Several characters experience the aftermath of three different airplane crashes in New Jersey over a short period of time in 1951 and 1952. The book was based on a real series of airplane crashes.

== Non-fiction ==
- The Judy Blume Diary (1981) (ISBN 978-0-440-44266-0)
  - A diary for children to write in, including an introduction by Blume and pages featuring quotations from Blume's characters
- Letters to Judy: What Kids Wish They Could Tell You (1986) (ISBN 978-0-399-13129-5)
  - A book of letters Blume received from children coupled with her responses, collected to be educational for parents
- The Judy Blume Memory Book (1988) (ISBN 978-0-440-40120-9)
  - A book filled with journal prompts for children

== As editor ==
- Places I Never Meant to Be (1999) (ISBN 978-0-689-82034-2)
  - In protest of increasingly common calls for book banning against her and other authors, Blume compiled a book of stories by authors whose books were frequently banned.

== Adaptations ==
- Forever (1978) – A television film adaptation starring Stephanie Zimbalist
- Otherwise Known as Sheila the Great (1991) – A television film adaptation produced by Tashmoo Productions, a studio owned by Blume's son
- Fudge (1996–1998) – A television series adaptation of the Fudge books
- Tiger Eyes (2012) – A film adaptation starring Willa Holland and directed by Blume's son
- Are You There God? It's Me, Margaret. (film) (2023) – A film adaptation starring Abby Ryder Fortson
- Forever (2025) – A television series adaptation starring Lovie Simone and Michael Cooper Jr.

== See also ==
- Judy Blume Forever
- List of most commonly challenged books in the United States
