= The Judy Blume Diary =

Activity book for aspiring writers

- First edition
- Author: Judy Blume
- Language: English
- Publisher: Yearling
- Publication date: August 15, 1981
- Publication place: United States

The Judy Blume Diary is an activity book meant to be written in for approximately one year by aspiring writers. In 1981, Judy Blume created the book to finance her KIDS Fund, which promotes communication between children and their parents.

Each page contains a quote from various Judy Blume books, such as Tiger Eyes, Forever, and Deenie. There are also a couple dozen black-and-white photographs of young adults, all of which are meant to inspire the writer. By the end, there are a few pages for the writer to reminisce on how he has grown and matured over the year and what he expects to accomplish in the next year. There is also a place for addresses, phone numbers, important dates, and a calendar for the years 1986–88.
