= Lawrence Blume =

American filmmaker

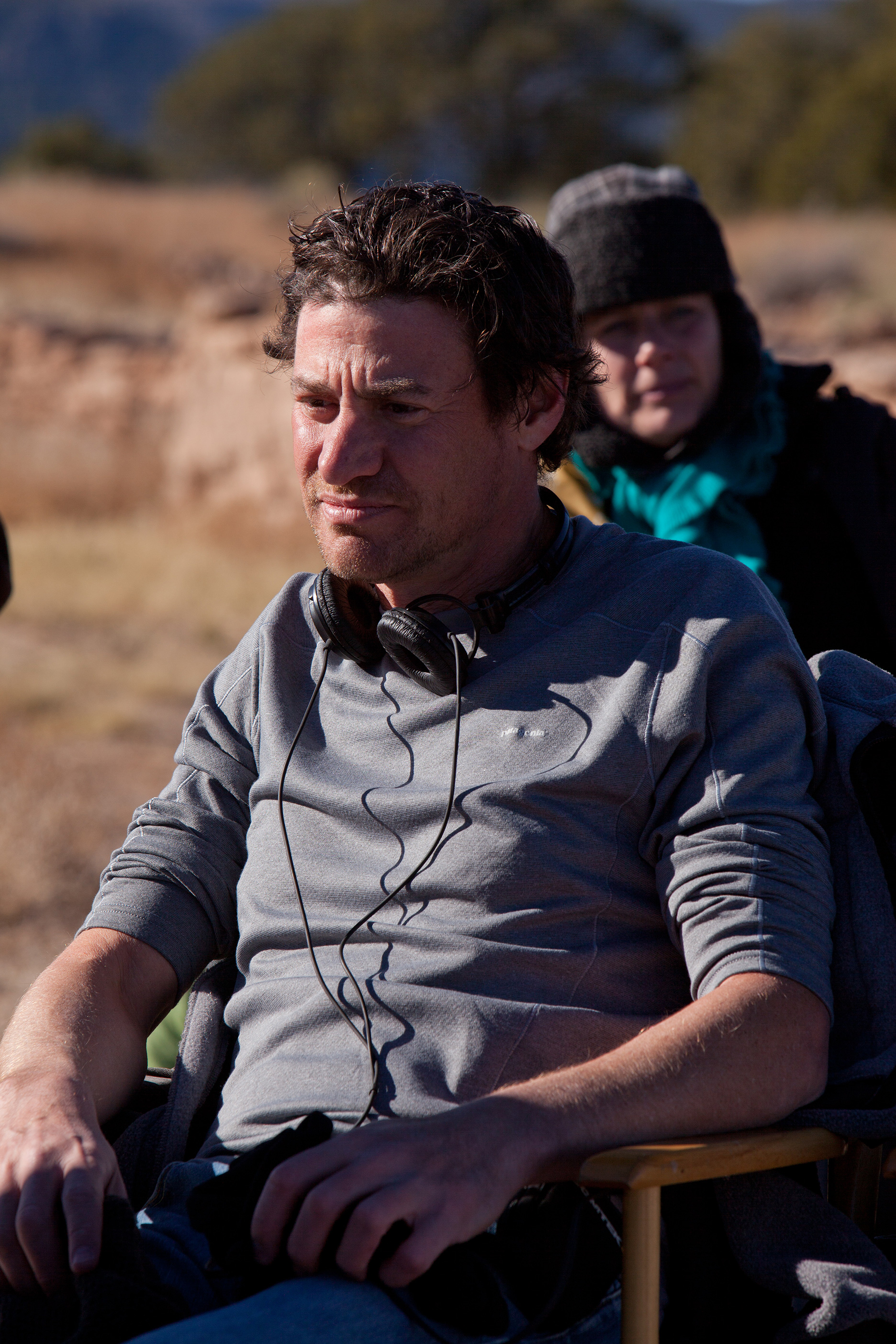
- Blume on set of Tiger Eyes
- Born: Lawrence Andrew Blume; 1963 (age 62–63); Plainfield, New Jersey
- Occupation: Filmmaker
- Years active: 1985–present

Lawrence Andrew Blume (born 1963) is an American filmmaker. He was named among the "Ten Rising Stars of Comedy" by The Hollywood Reporter for his first feature-length film, Martin & Orloff, which premiered at the 2002 US Comedy Arts Festival in Aspen and made its television debut on Comedy Central.

== Career ==
Blume was the founder/co-owner of PostWorks, New York's largest post-production company, and has worked as a production consultant on many films, including Who Killed The Electric Car and TransAmerica. As a pioneer in non-linear digital editing, he helped run the post production center at the Sundance Filmmaker's Lab, worked as a consultant to Avid Technology, and has lectured extensively on HDTV, Digital Cinema, and the convergence of television and the internet.

Blume directed Tiger Eyes, an adaptation of the young adult bestseller written by his mother, Judy Blume. It was released in 2012.

Blume is an entrepreneur with investments in media companies and real estate. He is a member of the Directors Guild of America and producers Guild of America.

== Filmography ==
Year	Film	Notes
1985	Evergreen	TV Mini-Series, Assistant to Director
1986	On Wings of Eagles	TV Mini-Series, Assistant Director
1987	To Walk a City's Street	TV, Director
1991	ABC Weekend Specials: Otherwise Known as Sheila the Great (#12.2)	TV Episode, Director and producer
1995	Search and Destroy	Editor
2002	Martin & Orloff	Director and producer
2005	Transamerica	Special Thanks
2006	Who Killed the Electric Car?	Special Thanks
2012	Tiger Eyes	Director, producer, screenwriter

== Awards, honors, and nominations ==
- Sarasota Film Festival ( "Best of Fest" Award)
- East Lansing Film Festival (Winner: Audience Award: Best Feature)
- The Art Institute of Chicago (Winner: Christopher Wetzel Award for Independent Comedy)
- High Times Magazine Stoney Award: Best Unreleased film of 2003 (nominee)
- IFP/West Independent Spirit Award: Motorola Producer of the Year
- Top Ten Films of 2003: Chicago Reader
- Hollywood Reporter: 2002 Ten Rising Stars of Comedy: Lawrence Blume
- Red Nation Film Festival (Winner: Best Film, Best Director, Best Actor)
- Palm Beach International Film Festival (Winner: Best Film)
- American Indian Film Festival (Winner)
