= Freckle Juice =

1971 children's book by Judy Blume

- First edition
- Author: Judy Blume
- Illustrator: Sonia O. Lisker
- Language: English
- Publisher: Four Winds Press
- Publication date: 1971
- Publication place: United States
- Media type: Print
- Pages: 47 pp
- ISBN: 0-440-42813-0
- OCLC: 16245047
- LC Class: MLCS 2006/13892 (P)

Freckle Juice (ISBN 0-440-42813-0) is a 1971 children's chapter book by Judy Blume with illustrations by Sonia O. Lisker. It is about a second grade student who wants to have freckles.

== Creation ==
Freckle Juice was published in 1971. After publishing the books Are You There God? It's Me, Margaret. (1970) and Then Again, Maybe I Won't (1971), which were written for a teenage audience, Blume returned to children's books. As with her other books, Blume ensured that Freckle Juice reflected both positive and negative aspects of being a child rather than a purely happy story. Unlike most of her books where she decided on the title last, Blume started with the title of Freckle Juice and wrote the story based on it. She got the title Freckle Juice from her daughter, who as a child mixed powder, shampoo, and soap in the bathtub to create what she called "freckle juice".

== Plot ==
Andrew Marcus envies his classmate Nicky Lane for his freckles. His classmate Sharon sells Andrew a handwritten recipe for "freckle juice" that, when drank, will cause freckles to sprout, claiming it had created the few freckles on her nose.

Andrew returns home and, following the recipe, creates the freckle juice from mixing grape juice and other condiments. Andrew reluctantly drinks the finished, putrid-tasting concoction and becomes sick. When his mother returns home to find both Andrew sick and evidence of the freckle juice, she reprimands him and sends him to bed with medicine. That night, Andrew has a nightmare about a monster, resembling Sharon, who force feeds Andrew gallons of "freckle juice," and gets the freckles, rather than Andrew. Andrew stays home from school the next day and recovers the day after.

Realizing that Sharon swindled him, Andrew dots his face and neck with a blue magic marker (unable to find a brown one) to prove the "freckle juice" had worked before arriving at school. No one is fooled by his drawn-on freckles and laughs at him. After recess, his teacher Miss Kelly sends him to the restroom with her own "secret formula" for removing freckles, which is a bar of lemon-scented soap. Andrew washes his "freckles" off and returns to class, where Miss Kelly tells him that he is a very handsome boy without freckles. Nicky then asks Miss Kelly for the freckle remover, claiming that he hates his freckles, but she tells him they did not look right on Andrew, but that he looks wonderful with them. The story ends with Sharon trying to sell Nicky a recipe that removes freckles.

== Analysis ==
Freckle Juice teaches readers to be happy with themselves instead of wanting what others have. The book also introduces children to the concept of business fraud and the social cost it incurs.

== Reception and legacy ==
Blume continued writing humorous books for young children after Freckle Juice, following it with Tales of a Fourth Grade Nothing (1972). Freckle Juice won the Michigan Young Readers' Award in 1980. An animated adaptation of Freckle Juice was released in 1987. The book is dated by the amounts of money it describes: Andrew has a weekly allowance of ten cents, and the freckle juice cost him fifty cents. As of 2023, Freckle Juice was maintaining the best sales of Blume's books outside of the Fudge Hatcher series.
