= Splendor in the Grass =

1961 American drama film

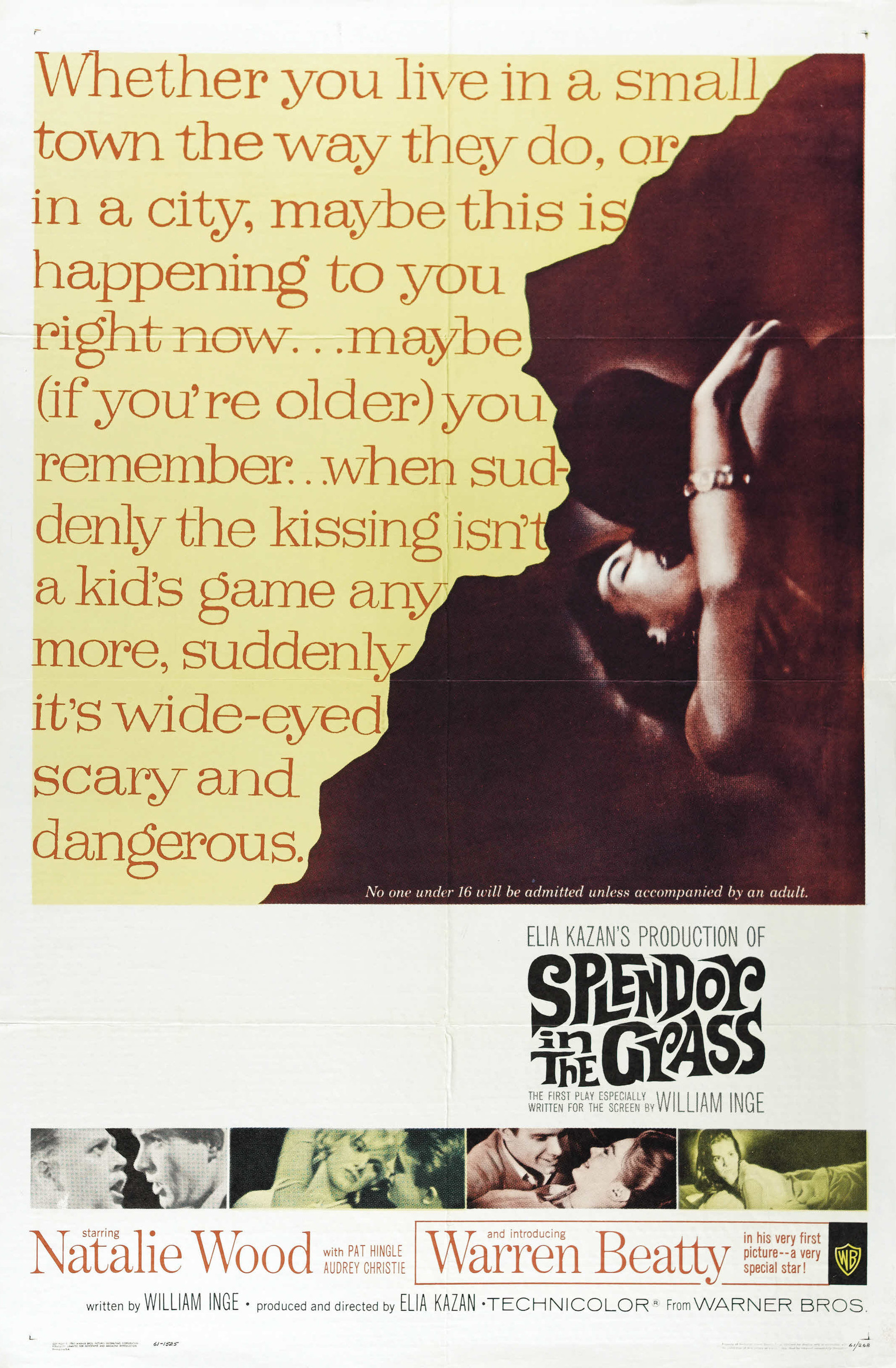
- Theatrical release poster by Bill Gold
- Directed by: Elia Kazan
- Written by: William Inge
- Produced by: Elia Kazan
- Starring: Natalie Wood; Warren Beatty; Pat Hingle; Audrey Christie
- Cinematography: Boris Kaufman, A.S.C.
- Edited by: Gene Milford
- Music by: David Amram
- Production companies: Newtown Productions; NBI Company
- Distributed by: Warner Bros.
- Release date: October 10, 1961
- Running time: 124 minutes
- Language: English
- Box office: $4 million (US / Canada) or $5.5 million

Splendor in the Grass is a 1961 American period drama film produced and directed by Elia Kazan, from a screenplay written by William Inge. It stars Natalie Wood and Warren Beatty (in his film debut) as two high school sweethearts, navigating feelings of sexual repression, love, and heartbreak. Pat Hingle, Audrey Christie, Barbara Loden, Zohra Lampert, and Joanna Roos are featured in supporting roles.

Splendor in the Grass was released theatrically on October 10, 1961, by Warner Bros. to critical and commercial success. It grossed $4 million, and received two nominations at the 34th Academy Awards for Best Actress (for Wood) and Best Original Screenplay, winning the latter.

== Plot ==
Original release trailer of the film Splendor in the Grass (1961)

In 1928 Kansas, teenagers Wilma Dean "Deanie" Loomis and her boyfriend, Bud Stamper, want a more physically intimate relationship, but heed the advice of their parents not to become more involved for the sake of Deanie's reputation and Bud's future plans for college. Bud's sister, Ginny, a flapper, is more worldly, having returned from Chicago after an annulment and rumors of an abortion to the disappointment and shame of her parents, Mr. and Mrs. Ace Stamper. Soon, Bud rescues Ginny from an attempted rape at a New Year's Eve party. Disturbed by what he has seen, he tells Deanie they should stop fooling around, and they break up.

Bud has a liaison with a friend, Juanita. Shortly afterward, Deanie explodes in anger when her mother asks if she is still a virgin. Allen "Toots" Tuttle takes Deanie to a school dance where she sees Bud, and tries to entice him into having sex. Bud rebuffs her and Deanie runs back to Toots, who drives her to a private spot. While there, Deanie realizes that she can't go through with sex, at which point she is almost raped. Escaping from Toots and driven close to madness, she attempts suicide by jumping in the pond, but is rescued just before reaching the waterfalls. Her parents sell their oil stock to pay for her institutionalization, and fortuitously turn a profit prior to the Crash of 1929 that leads to the Great Depression.

While Deanie is in the institution, she meets patient Johnny Masterson, who has anger issues targeted at his parents, who want him to be a surgeon. The two form a bond. Meanwhile, Bud is sent to Yale, where he fails practically all his courses but meets Angelina, the daughter of Italian immigrants who run a local restaurant in New Haven. In October 1929, Bud's father Ace travels to New Haven in an attempt to persuade the dean not to expel Bud from school. Bud tells the dean he only aspires to own a ranch. The stock market crashes while Ace is in New Haven, and he loses almost everything. He takes Bud to New York for a weekend, including to a cabaret nightclub, and has a prostitute sent to Bud's room. Bud rebuffs her. Ace commits suicide by jumping from a building – something he was joking about a short time earlier.

Deanie returns from the asylum after two years and six months, "almost to the day." Ace's widow has gone to live with relatives, and Bud's sister has died in a car crash. Deanie's mother wants to shield her from any potential anguish from meeting Bud, so she pretends to not know where he is. When Deanie's friends from high school come over, her mother gets them to agree to feign ignorance about Bud's whereabouts. However, Deanie's father refuses to coddle his daughter and tells her that Bud has taken up ranching and lives on the old family farm. Her friends drive Deanie to meet Bud at an old farmhouse. He is dressed in plain clothes and married to Angelina; they have an infant son named Bud Jr. and another child on the way. Deanie lets Bud know she is going to marry John (who is now a doctor in Cincinnati). During their brief reunion, Deanie and Bud realize that both must accept what life has thrown at them. Bud says, "What's the point? You gotta take what comes." They each relate that they "don't think about happiness very much anymore."

As Deanie leaves with her friends, Bud only seems partially satisfied by the direction his life has taken. After the others are gone, he reassures Angelina, who has realized that Deanie was once the love of his life. Driving away, Deanie's friends ask her if she is still in love with Bud. She does not answer them, but her voice is heard reciting four lines from Wordsworth's "Intimations of Immortality":

Though nothing can bring back the hour
Of splendor in the grass, glory in the flower
We will grieve not; rather find
Strength in what remains behind.

== Cast ==
- Natalie Wood as Wilma Dean "Deanie" Loomis
- Pat Hingle as Ace Stamper
- Audrey Christie as Frieda Loomis
- Barbara Loden as Virginia "Ginny" Stamper
- Zohra Lampert as Angelina
- Warren Beatty as Bud Stamper
- Fred Stewart as Del Loomis
- Joanna Roos as Mrs. Stamper
- John McGovern as Doc Smiley
- Jan Norris as Juanita Howard
- Martine Bartlett as Miss Metcalf
- Gary Lockwood as Allen "Toots" Tuttle
- Sandy Dennis as Kay
- Crystal Field as Hazel
- Marla Adams as June
- Lynn Loring as Carolyn
- Phyllis Diller as Texas Guinan
- Sean Garrison as Glenn
- Charles Robinson as Johnny Masterson (uncredited)
- Ivor Francis as Dr. Judd (uncredited)

== Production ==
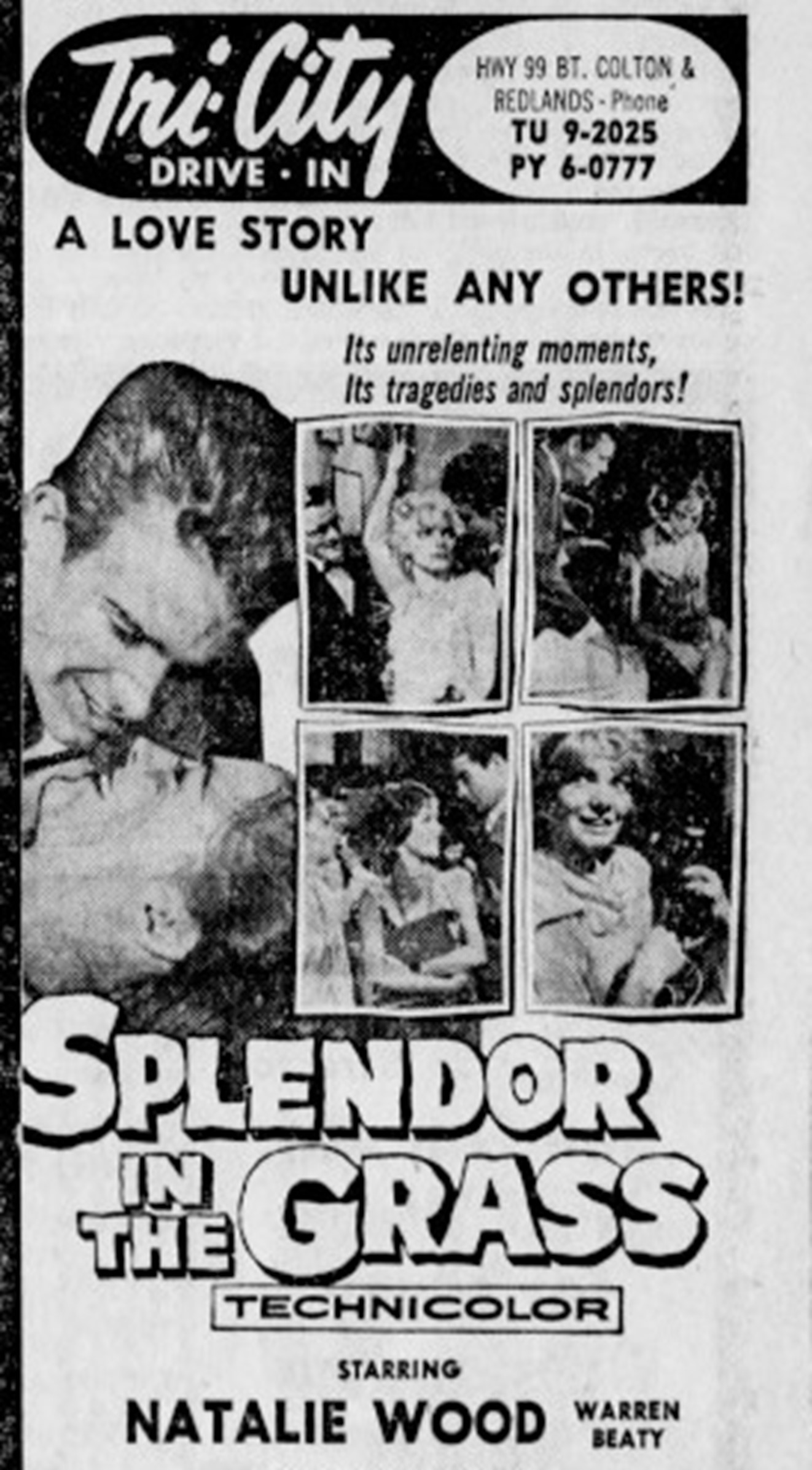
Drive-in advertisement from 1962

Filmed in New York City at Filmways Studios, Splendor in the Grass is based on people whom screenwriter William Inge knew while growing up in Kansas in the 1920s. He told the story to director Elia Kazan when they were working on a production of Inge's play The Dark at the Top of the Stairs in 1957. They agreed that it would make a good film and that they wanted to work together on it. Inge wrote it first as a novel, then as a screenplay.

The film's title is taken from a line of William Wordsworth's poem "Ode: Intimations of Immortality from Recollections of Early Childhood":

What though the radiance which was once so bright
Be now for ever taken from my sight,
Though nothing can bring back the hour
Of splendour in the grass, of glory in the flower;
We will grieve not, rather find
Strength in what remains behind...

Two years before writing the screenplay for the film, Inge wrote Glory in the Flower (1953), a stage play whose title comes from the same line of the Wordsworth poem. The play relates the story of two middle-aged, former lovers who meet again briefly at a diner after a long estrangement; they are essentially the same characters as Bud and Deanie, though the names are Bus and Jackie.

Scenes of Kansas and the Loomis home were shot in the Travis section of Staten Island, New York City. Exterior scenes of the high school campus were shot at Horace Mann School in the Bronx. The gothic buildings of the North Campus of The City College of New York stand in for Yale University in New Haven. The scenes at the waterfall were shot in High Falls, New York, summer home of director Kazan.

Warren Beatty, while having appeared on television (in particular a recurring role on The Many Loves of Dobie Gillis), made his screen debut in this film. He had met Inge the year before while appearing in Inge's play A Loss of Roses on Broadway.

Inge also made his screen debut in the film, as did Sandy Dennis who appeared in a small role as a classmate of Deanie. Marla Adams and Phyllis Diller were others who made their first appearances in this film. Diller's role was based on Texas Guinan, a famous actress and restaurateur, who owned the famous 300 Club in New York City in the 20s.

== Reception ==
Bosley Crowther of The New York Times called the film a "frank and ferocious social drama that makes the eyes pop and the modest cheek burn", and praised the performances of Hingle, Christie and Beatty, calling the latter a "surprising newcomer". He also heavily praised Wood in the leading role, writing: "Miss Wood has a beauty and radiance that carry her through a role of violent passions and depressions with unsullied purity and strength. There is poetry in her performance, and her eyes in the final scene bespeak the moral significance and emotional fulfillment of this film."

Writing in Esquire magazine, however, Dwight Macdonald confirmed the notion that Elia Kazan was "as vulgar a director as has come along since Cecil B. De Mille." He further commented:

I've never been in Kansas, but I suspect that parents there even way back in 1928 were not stupid to the point of villainy and that their children were not sexually frustrated to the point of lunacy...Kazan is "forthright" the way a butcher is forthright when he slaps down a steak for the customer's inspection. [He] won't give up anything that can be exploited.

As for the performances, Variety stated that Wood and Beatty "deliver convincing, appealing performances" and Christie and Hingle were "truly exceptional", but also found "something awkward about the picture's mechanical rhythm. There are missing links and blind alleys within the story. Several times it segues abruptly from a climax to a point much later in time at which is encountered revelations and eventualities the auditor cannot take for granted. Too much time is spent focusing attention on characters of minor significance in themselves." Philip K. Scheuer of the Los Angeles Times wrote, "The picture does have its theatrical excesses and falls short idealistically in that its morality remains unresolved; nevertheless, it is film-making of the first order and one of the few significant American dramas we have had this year." Richard L. Coe of The Washington Post found "beauty and truth" in the story but thought "the parents' incessant nagging and unlistening ears are not convincing" and that Christie and Hingle's characters "could do all that they do in far less footage." Harrison's Reports awarded a grade of "Very Good" and wrote that the adult themes "do not blow up the story into a soap-opera bubble. The emotional cheapness and the sordid crudeness that are evidencing themselves in so many of the yarns being spun, these days, out of the sexual pattern of young, immoral behavior is not to be found here. Instead, you find a poignantly appealing and warmly touching performance of lovely Natalie Wood that gives the story meaning." Brendan Gill of The New Yorker disagreed and criticized the film as being "as phony a picture as I can remember seeing," writing that Inge and Kazan "must know perfectly well that the young people whom they cause to go thrashing about in 'Splendor in the Grass' bear practically no relation to young people in real life ... one has no choice but to suppose that this unwholesome sally into adolescent sexology was devised neither to instruct our minds nor to move our hearts but to arouse a prurient interest and produce a box-office smasheroo. I can't help hoping they have overplayed their hand."

Time magazine said "the script, on the whole, is the weakest element of the picture, but scriptwriter Inge can hardly be blamed for it" because it had been "heavily edited" by Kazan; the unidentified reviewer called the film a "relatively simple story of adolescent love and frustration" that has been "jargoned-up and chaptered-out till it sounds like an angry psychosociological monograph describing the sexual mores of the heartless heartland."

The film holds a score of 72% on Rotten Tomatoes based on 29 reviews. Metacritic, which uses a weighted average, assigned the film a score of 74 out of 100, based on 10 critics, indicating "generally favorable" reviews.

== Awards and nominations ==
Award	Category	Nominee(s)	Result	Ref.
Academy Awards	Best Actress	Natalie Wood	Nominated	
Academy Awards	Best Story and Screenplay – Written Directly for the Screen	William Inge	Won	
British Academy Film Awards	Best Foreign Actress	Natalie Wood	Nominated	
Directors Guild of America Awards	Outstanding Directorial Achievement in Motion Pictures	Elia Kazan	Nominated	
Golden Globe Awards	Best Motion Picture – Drama		Nominated	
Golden Globe Awards	Best Actor in a Motion Picture – Drama	Warren Beatty	Nominated	
Golden Globe Awards	Best Actress in a Motion Picture – Drama	Natalie Wood	Nominated	
Golden Globe Awards	Most Promising Newcomer – Male	Warren Beatty	Won	
Laurel Awards	Top Female Dramatic Performance	Natalie Wood	Nominated	
Photoplay Awards	Gold Medal		Won	

- The film ranked No. 50 on Entertainment Weekly's list of the 50 Best High School Movies. In 2002, the American Film Institute ranked Splendor in the Grass number 47 on its list of the Top 100 Greatest Love Stories of All Time.

== Remake ==
Splendor in the Grass was re-made as the 1981 television film Splendor in the Grass with Melissa Gilbert, Cyril O'Reilly, and Michelle Pfeiffer.

== In popular culture ==
The movie's story line and main character inspired a hit song by Shaun Cassidy entitled "Hey Deanie". It was written by Eric Carmen, who also later recorded the song. Cassidy's rendition reached No. 7 on the US Billboard Hot 100 during the winter of 1978. "Hey Deanie" was the second of two songs directly inspired by the movie, the first being Jackie DeShannon's 1966 song, "Splendor in the Grass".

In 1973 Judy Blume published a young adult novel entitled Deenie. The first few lines of the book have the central character introduce herself and explain that shortly before she was born her mother saw a movie about a beautiful girl named Wilmadeene whom everybody called Deenie for short, and that the first time that she held her baby daughter she knew the baby would turn out beautiful and so named her Deenie too. Blume's Deenie goes on to explain that it took her almost 13 years to find out that the girl in the movie went crazy and "ended up on the funny farm", and that her mother advised her to forget that part of the story.

In the episode "Black Maps and Motel Rooms" of the television show True Detective, the film is featured.

The band Splendora named their debut studio album, In The Grass, in reference to the film.

== See also ==
- List of American films of 1961
