= It's Not the End of the World (disambiguation) =

It's Not the End of the World may refer to:

- It's Not the End of the World (1972), a novel by Judy Blume
- "It's Not the End of the World, But I Can See It from Here", a song by Lostprophets from their 2010 album The Betrayed
- "It's Not the End of the World?", a song by Super Furry Animals from their 2001 album Rings Around the World
