= Blubber (disambiguation) =

Blubber is a thick layer of vascularized fat found under the skin of all cetaceans, pinnipeds, and sirenians.

Blubber may also refer to:

== Art, entertainment, and media ==
- Blubber (novel), a 1974 children's novel by Judy Blume
- Blubber Bear, a fictional character in the television series Wacky Races

== See also ==
- Blibber-Blubber
- Blubbering
