= Joanna Roos =

American actress and playwright

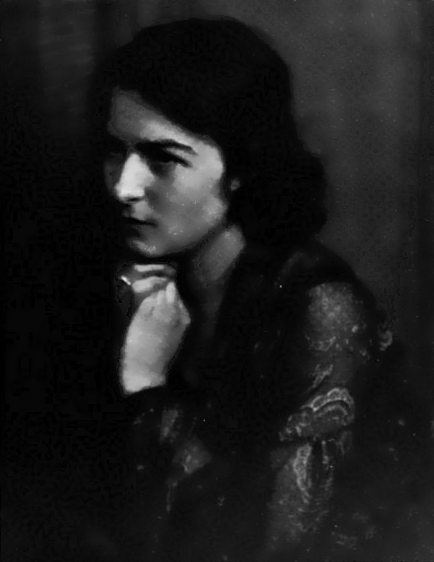
- Roos c. 1922
- Born: Dorothy Roos; January 11, 1901; Brooklyn, New York, U.S.
- Died: May 13, 1989 (aged 88); Medical Center at Princeton, New Jersey, U.S.
- Education: Syracuse University
- Occupations: Actress, Playwright
- Spouse: Edmund Rickett
- Writing career
- Years active: 1932–1972

Signature
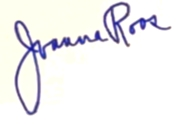

Joanna Roos (born Dorothy Roos, January 11, 1901 – May 13, 1989) was an American Broadway, radio, television, and film actress and a playwright. She was born in Brooklyn in 1901 and attended Syracuse University as well as Yvette Guilbert's School in New York and Paris.

== Early years ==
Roos was the daughter of Mr. and Mrs. John A. Roos of Upper Montclair, New Jersey. She was born in Brooklyn, and her family moved to Syracuse when she was 10 years old. She completed high school in Syracuse and earned a bachelor of arts degree from Syracuse University. She earned money for her college expenses by working as a stenographer at The Post-Standard, a Syracuse newspaper and by giving readings with touring Lyceum companies.

After Roos graduated from college, she studied at Yvette Guilbert's School of the Theatre.

== Career ==
Roos's professional theatrical debut occurred in May 1921 in a performance of The Harlequinade at the Neighborhood Playhouse in New York City.

In 1930, Roos performed the role of Sofya Alexandrovna in a classic performance of the Anton Chekhov play Uncle Vanya at the Cort Theatre in New York City, a production that one critic called "unforgettable". The show ran for 71 performances. Her other Broadway credits included Peer Gynt (1960), Orpheus Descending (1957), Joan of Lorraine (1946), War President (1944), The Trojan Women (1941), Abe Lincoln in Illinois (1938), Daughters of Atreus (1936), Black Widow (1936), Panic (1935), Tight Britches (1934), Life Begins (1932), Little Women (1931), Schoolgirl (1930), Veneer (1929), Grand Street Follies [1928], Lovers and Enemies (1927), Makropoulos Secret (1926), Loggerheads (1925),Grand Street Follies [1924], This Fine-Pretty World (1923), The Player Queen (1923), The Green Ring (1922), and The Idle Inn (1921).

She starred as Elizabeth Stover in "The House", written by Art Wallace, a 30-minute episode of the mystery anthology series The Web, broadcast on live television airing on August 29, 1954. In 1958, Roos was a member of the cast of Today Is Ours, a drama on NBC Television.

On radio, Roos was heard on Joyce Jordan, M.D. and other soap operas.

She retired in 1978 from her role as Sarah Dale Caldwell McCauley on the soap opera Love of Life. She had played the role from 1968 to 1978, which marked her second role on the series, which became her best known role. In 1955–1957, she had originally played the role of compassionate Althea Raven, the first mother in-law of heroine Vanessa Dale.

She was a founding member of the New Dramatists Committee. Several of the plays she wrote for the group won awards.

== Personal life ==
Roos was married to musician Edmund Rickett.

== Filmography ==
Year	Title	Role	Notes
1956	Patterns	Miss Lanier	
1961	Splendor in the Grass	Mrs. Stamper	
1962	Two Weeks in Another Town	Janet Bark	

== Gallery ==
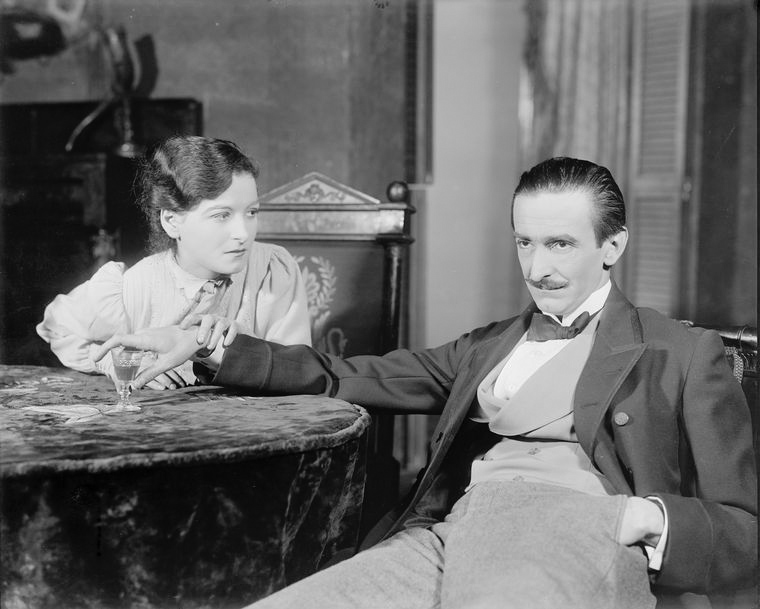
Joanna Roos and fellow actor Osgood Perkins during a 1930 performance of the Chekhov play Uncle Vanya

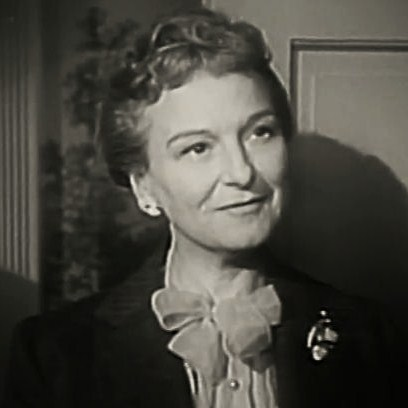
In Patterns
