= The Pain and the Great One =

1974 picture book by Judy Blume

- 1984 edition
- Author: Judy Blume
- Illustrator: Irene Trivas, Tomie dePaola
- Cover artist: Tomie dePaola
- Language: English
- Genre: Children's book
- Publisher: Bradbury Press
- Publication date: 1974
- Publication place: United States
- Media type: Print
- Pages: 32

The Pain and the Great One is a children's picture book published in 1974, written by Judy Blume and illustrated by Irene Trivas. This is the only picture book written by Blume that American illustrator Tomie dePaola illustrated. However, many of Blume's other novels, notably The One in the Middle Is the Green Kangaroo and Tales of a Fourth Grade Nothing, also have interior illustrations.

The book follows the sibling rivalry between a sister (age 8; third grade) and her younger brother (age 6; first grade). The book is divided into two parts, each told from the viewpoint of one sibling. The girl refers to her brother as "The Pain," due to him always being a nuisance to her, while the boy calls his sister "The Great One," a sarcastic nickname based on her thinking herself the better sibling. It is a humorous look at the mixture of emotions shared by young siblings.

On the last page of each section, the sibling narrates (and concludes with) the line, "And Daddy says, 'The Pain/the Great One is just what they always wanted!'. YUCK! I think they love him/her better than me!".

Years later, between 2007 and 2009, Blume published four additional books featuring these characters; they are not picture books.
