= David Phillips (cinematographer) =

American cinematographer

David Phillips (1951 – February 4, 2017) was an American cinematographer. Phillips made his major feature film debut as the cinematographer for 1995's The Basketball Diaries, which was directed by Scott Kalvert and starred Leonardo DiCaprio and Mark Wahlberg. His additional feature film credits included Lift (2002), starring Kerry Washington; Martin & Orloff (2002), starring Matt Walsh and Ian Roberts; and Beer League (2006), which starred and was written by Artie Lange.

Phillips, who grew up in New Haven, Connecticut, received his bachelor's degree in English from Boston University. He began his career as a cinematographer for music videos, including "I Drove All Night" by Cyndi Lauper in 1989 and the video for "Step by Step" by the New Kids on the Block, released in 1990.

Phillips early cinematography also included several music documentary films, including Midnight Oil: Black Rain Falls and Twelve Deadly Cyns...and Then Some, the companion to Cyndi Lauper's 1994 greatest hits album of the same name. Phillips also filmed Mark Wahlberg's hit 1993 fitness video, Form… Focus… Fitness, the Marky Mark Workout (ISBN 1-55510-910-1).

Phillips' television credits included the 1996 HBO series, The High Life, as well as several episodes of Saturday Night Live during the mid-2000s.

Phillips died from natural causes in New York City on February 4, 2017, at the age of 65. He was survived by his mother, Beatrice, and two siblings, Nancy and James.
