= Martin & Orloff =

- Directed by: Lawrence Blume
- Screenplay by: Matt Walsh; Ian Roberts; Katie Roberts
- Produced by: Rene Bastian; Lawrence Blume; Gill Holland
- Starring: Matt Walsh; Ian Roberts; H. Jon Benjamin; Amy Poehler; Kim Raver; Matt Besser
- Cinematography: David Phillips
- Edited by: Jay Freund
- Music by: Roy Nathanson; Bill Ware
- Release date: March 11, 2002
- Running time: 87 minutes

Martin & Orloff is a 2002 feature film written by and starring Matt Walsh and Ian Roberts, best known as half of the Upright Citizens Brigade comedy troupe, along with Ian's wife Katie Roberts. The film was produced and directed by Lawrence Blume and features an ensemble cast of alternative comedians including H. Jon Benjamin, David Cross, Andy Richter, Matt Besser, Amy Poehler, Tina Fey (in her film debut), Janeane Garofalo, and Rachel Dratch, as well as actress Kim Raver as Orloff's girlfriend.

Martin and Orloff is available on DVD through Anchor Bay Entertainment and made its television debut on Comedy Central (Summer 2006).

== Plot ==
Martin, who had previously tried to kill himself following the so-called "Eggroll Incident", has been released from the mental hospital. He goes back to work, where he designs corporate mascot costumes. He's not completely recovered yet, though, and is recommended to Dr. Orloff, who is possibly the worst doctor in the world. Martin's first appointment consists of a single question. They skip out on the rest of the appointment to go to a softball game, which Orloff drags Martin to. Screwball adventures ensue.

== Cast ==
- Ian Roberts as Martin Flam, a recently suicidal man
- Matt Walsh as Dr. Eric Orloff, an incompetent psychiatrist
- H. Jon Benjamin as Keith, Orloff's Gulf War veteran friend
- Amy Poehler as Patty, Orloff's co-dependent stripper friend
- Kim Raver as Kashia, Orloff's girlfriend
- Matt Besser as Ron, Martin's boss
- Les Mau as Mr. Chan, a client of Martin's
- David Cross as Don Wassermann
- Katie Roberts as Donna
- Sal E. Graziano as Jimbo, Patty's ex-boyfriend
- Marylouise Burke as Mrs. Flam
- Miriam Tolan as Linda
- Teddy Coluca as Petros
- Jake T. Austin as boy with balloon (uncredited)

== Reception ==
Metacritic assigned a score of 48 out of 100 based on 11 critics, indicating "mixed or average reviews".

=== Accolades ===
The film has won numerous awards including:

- Texas Chainsaw Massacre Film Festival (Winner: Director’s Prize)
- Sarasota Film Festival ( “Best of Fest” Award)
- East Lansing Film Festival (Winner: Audience Award: Best Feature)
- The Art Institute of Chicago (Winner: Christopher Wetzel Award for Independent Comedy)
- High Times Magazine Stoney Award: Best Unreleased film of 2003 (nominee)
- IFP/West Independent Spirit Award: Motorola Producer of the Year
- Top Ten Films of 2003: Chicago Reader
- Hollywood Reporter: 2002 Ten Rising Stars of Comedy: Lawrence Blume
