= Tiger Eyes =

1981 young adult novel by Judy Blume

- First edition
- Author: Judy Blume
- Language: English
- Genre: Young adult literature
- Publisher: Bradbury
- Publication date: 1981
- Publication place: United States
- Media type: Print (Hardback & Paperback)
- Pages: 224 pp
- ISBN: 0-87888-185-9
- OCLC: 7552139
- LC Class: PZ7.B6265 Ti

Tiger Eyes is a young adult novel written by Judy Blume in 1981 about a 15-year-old girl attempting to cope with the unexpected death of her father. In 2012, the novel was adapted into a film of the same name, directed by Judy's son, Lawrence Blume, and starring Willa Holland as Davey Wexler.

== Plot summary ==
Davis “Davey” Wexler, along with her mother, Gwen, and her little brother, Jason, have just attended the funeral of her father, Adam, who was shot to death in a holdup at their 7-Eleven convenience store in Atlantic City. After lying in bed for days on end and not eating, Davey starts her tenth year of school, but faints on her first day from anxiety. She goes for a checkup, and the doctor explains Davey is having panic attacks.

Davey's mother, Gwen, decides they need to get away for awhile and takes up an offer from Adam's older sister, Bitsy, and his brother-in-law Walter to come stay with them in Los Alamos, New Mexico. A few days before they are scheduled to return to Atlantic City, Gwen receives news their store has been further vandalized, and she decides they're going to stay in Los Alamos through the end of the school year.

Bitsy and Walter, who were unable to have children, start treating Davey and Jason like their own kids, which causes tension between them and Davey. They're overprotective, and Davey becomes more upset when her mother just sits back and allows them to parent her. During this time, Gwen gets a job at the Los Alamos National Laboratory as a temp. She begins seeing a therapist named Miriam and convinces Davey to see her as well.

Meanwhile, Davey explores the town on her aunt's bicycle. One day, she goes to a canyon and climbs down. There, she runs into an older boy who calls himself Wolf. Davey calls herself Tiger when they introduce each other. She also becomes a candy striper at the hospital with her new friend, Jane, and meets a cancer patient who turns out to be Wolf's father. The inspiration from Wolf and his father changes Davey for the better. Wolf's father eventually dies from cancer, and Wolf leaves.

Another story is Jane's alcoholism and Davey's desire to help her get sober. Also, in three different parts Davey describes the evening her father was shot and killed, which causes her in the beginning of the book to completely freak out when Jason experiences a nosebleed from the altitude. She carries a paper bag with her, which is revealed to contain the clothing she was wearing when she found her father and held him until he died; the clothing was soaked with his blood. After a session with Miriam, she finally breaks down and is able to mourn her father. She eventually buries the clothing and a bread knife she carried for self-defense in a cave in the canyon where she met Wolf.

Eventually, against Bitsy's wishes, Gwen decides to return the family to Atlantic City to begin a new life. Walter helps them buy a car for the trip home. Gwen gets a job in one of the hotels, thanks to the credentials she gained while working at the lab, and with the aid of her friend, Audrey. Once they're back home, Davey often wonders if anyone will know how much she had changed, but realizes some changes happen deep down and only you know about them.

== Controversy ==
Judy Blume states in her book Places I Never Meant to Be this was the only book she has written she has voluntarily censored. In the original draft submitted to her editor, the character Davey masturbates while thinking about Wolf. Her editor pointed out the book was likely to be read by many more young readers if the scene was left out. After agonizing over the decision, Blume agreed and removed the passage.

This book is on the American Library Association list of the 100 Most Frequently Challenged Books of 1990-2000 at number 89.

== Film ==
A film version of the novel, directed by the author's son Lawrence Blume, started production in October 2010 and was released at the 15th Annual Sonoma International Film Festival on April 12, 2012. It won the Jury Award for Best Feature in the Palm Beach International Film Festival. Willa Holland is cast as Davey, Tatanka Means as Wolf and Amy Jo Johnson as Gwen Wexler. It was released on June 7, 2013 both in art house cinemas and video-on-demand.

== See also ==
- List of most commonly challenged books in the U.S.
