= Starring Sally J. Freedman as Herself =

1977 young adult novel by Judy Blume

- First edition
- Author: Judy Blume
- Language: English
- Genre: Young adult novel
- Publisher: Bradbury
- Publication date: 1977
- Publication place: United States
- Media type: Print (Paperback)
- Pages: 298 pp
- ISBN: 0-87888-113-1
- OCLC: 2951936
- LC Class: PZ7.B6265 St

Starring Sally J. Freedman as Herself is a 1977 young adult novel by Judy Blume. It is set in 1947 and follows the imaginative 10-year-old Sally, who likes to make up stories in her head, as her family moves from New Jersey to Miami Beach. While not as controversial as some of her other novels, Blume does manage to address the following themes of late 1940s life in America: racism, anti-Semitism and sibling rivalry. This novel is her most autobiographical, with many parallels between Blume's own life and that of Sally. Blume has said, "Sally is the kind of kid I was at ten."

== Plot ==
Sally J. Freedman moves from New Jersey to Miami, Florida with her brother, Douglas, their mother, and grandmother at the end of World War II. This is because of Douglas' health, as he caught nephritis from staying in wet clothes in the cold. The novel first touches on racism when, on the train to Florida, Sally meets a black woman traveling with her young sons who are about Sally's age and infant daughter who Sally gets to hold. The next day, Sally goes back to visit them and discovers that laws requiring racial segregation in the 1940s in the Southern United States force them to move to another car on the train. Sally is infuriated and does not understand why her mother is not upset as well. Before she can be admitted to her new school, she must undergo a physical examination in which the school nurse discovers nits (head louse eggs) in her hair. The school nurse tries to calm her mother, who is insulted and taking the news personally, by saying, "Look Mrs. Freedman, don't take this personally. You've been traveling, she could have picked them up anywhere."

In her new school, Sally meets new friends, the first being Barbara, who teaches her all about the area. Later, she meets a sixth grader named Andrea and a girl named Shelby from a different class. She has a difficult first day at school, but over time she begins to make more friends. The next character she meets is Peter Hornstein, a so-called "Latin Lover," who seems to like her, but he ignores her when a new girl named Jackie arrives. It troubles Sally that he is going after a different girl, and she begins to like him back. She also meets Harriet Goodman, who takes an instant disliking of her simply because she's a "snowbird".

A central part in the story is when Sally meets a man named Mr. Zavodsky, who lives in her building. He offers some rock candy to her and Andrea. She refuses it even though Andrea accepts it, which makes her upset. Sally, who is Jewish, notices that Mr. Zavodsky looks similar to Adolf Hitler and comes to believe (because of her active imagination) that he is actually him in disguise and retiring in Miami.

Another important plotline is when Sally finds out that her father, who had just turned 42, is the same age as his two brothers were when they died. Superstitious, Sally worries that he may die in his 42nd year, because of the well-known superstition "all bad things happen in threes".

Sally writes (but never mails) many letters to Mr. Zavodsky, always saying she will get him someday. She spies on him, secretly listening to his phone conversations on a party line. She worries at one point that he killed her friend, Shelby, and believes the rock candy he offers is actually poisoned. In the end, he dies of a heart attack.

In the one year Sally spends in Miami, she learns how babies are made, attends but loses a contest, drinks whiskey while attempting to make Creme de Cacao, kisses Peter at their teacher's wedding, and strengthens her relationship with her relatives.

At the very end, Sally and her family return to New Jersey.

== Themes ==
This historical novel focuses on a young adolescent growing up in the post-World War II United States. Other themes include sibling rivalry, making friends, bigotry, and antisemitism.

Numerous references are made to technology and cultural events in post-World War II America such as party telephone lines and rotary phones, train travel instead of plane travel, and rationing.

Racial segregation is also noted in this book, both from the above-mentioned situation on the train with the black family, and another incident where Sally inadvertently drank from a "colored" drinking fountain in a drug store and a woman pulled her off it and freaked out over what she might "catch" from it.

== Characters ==
- Sally J. Freedman: The main character in the story.
- Peter Hornstein: A boy who likes Sally and shows it by constantly teasing her.
- Andrea Rubin: Sally's best friend, even though she is a year older and in sixth grade. She is from Brooklyn.
- Barbara: Sally's first friend, who helps her adjust to the new school. Her father was killed in World War II.
- Shelby: Sally's friend, who goes to a different class than her and owns her favorite game, Jolly Roger.
- Christine: Sally's best friend from New Jersey who starts to go by "Chrissy".
- Douglas: Sally's 13-year-old brother, a loner with a sarcastic streak who is very smart (he skipped third grade).
- Mr. Zavodsky: A man who lives in Sally's building, looks similar to, and is assumed to be (by her) Adolf Hitler.
- Harriet Goodman: One of Sally's classmates who tells her she "hates her" because she doesn't live in Miami all year round like her.
- Darlene: Douglas' wealthy, amply-contoured new sweetheart.
- Georgia Blue Eyes: Andrea's love interest who calls Sally "Sally Nevermind" when they first met at the Seagull pool club.
- Vicki: Ted's girlfriend (the story tells us she is not married to him) who looks like Rita Hayworth.
- Ted: Vicki's boyfriend, a tall man from New York City who got rich through the stock market.
- Ma Fanny: Sally's maternal grandmother.
- Aunt Bette and Uncle Jack: Sally and Douglas' aunt and uncle from Louise's side of the family.
- Miss Swetnick: Sally's teacher, who is very pretty and engaged to Peter Hornstein's older brother, Hank.
- Hank: Peter Hornstein's older brother.
- Tante Rose: Sally and Douglas' great aunt. She is only mentioned in the novel, as she was killed at Dachau.
- Lila: Sally and Douglas' cousin twice removed. She was killed at Dachau with her mother, Tante Rose, and appears in the novel only in Sally's daydreams.
- Louise: Sally and Douglas' mother, a stay-at-home mom. She worries just about everything.
- Arnold: Sally and Douglas' father, called "Doey-bird" by Sally because he whistles all the time. He is a dentist.
- Jackie: A girl who Peter likes and Sally hates because of that.
- Omar: Andrea's pet cat.
- Alice and Betsy: Two friends of Sally's from New Jersey.
- Linda: Andrea's younger sister, a polio survivor. Her family is in Miami for the same reason as Sally's. ( the reason of siblings being sick coming to Floria because of the warm weather so they can get better )

== Real people mentioned ==
- Esther Williams: Sally's favorite movie star.
- Rita Hayworth: Mentioned briefly in the book. It is noted that Vicki looks like her.
- Margaret O'Brien: Another one of Sally's favorite movie stars.
- Adolf Hitler: German politician, leader of the Nazi party, turned dictator.
- Jane Russell: Actress whose low-cut blouse makes Douglas want to go see her in The Outlaw.
- Humphrey Bogart: Mentioned briefly, commenting on the appearance of the telephone delivery man.
- Bing Crosby: Mentioned in the prologue—he was singing on the radio.
- William Halsey, Jr. (Admiral Halsey): A fleet admiral in the U.S. Navy during World War II.

Popular songs mentioned in the novel include "Swinging on a Star" (the one Crosby is singing on the radio in the prologue), "Peg O' My Heart" (it is mentioned that Sally's classmate, Harriet Goodman, can play it on the piano), and "Ballerina" (it is mentioned that it, one of Sally's favorites, is number one on the Hit Parade charts).
