= Wifey (novel) =

1978 novel by Judy Blume

- First edition
- Author: Judy Blume
- Language: English
- Publisher: Putnam
- Publication date: 1978
- Publication place: United States
- Media type: Print
- Pages: 288 pp
- ISBN: 0-399-12241-9
- OCLC: 3843199
- Dewey Decimal: 813/.5/4
- LC Class: PZ4.B65748 Wi 1978 PS3552.L843

Wifey is a 1978 American novel written by Judy Blume.

== Plot ==
The story follows the life of bored 1970s New Jersey housewife, Sandy Pressman, who decides to reinvigorate her life by having an extramarital affair with an old high school boyfriend. This decision is complicated when she accidentally discovers evidence her husband might be having a long-term affair. Somewhat emblematic of the time period of open marriages and different mores, this was the first novel by Blume to directly address adult lives and sexuality.

== Author's commentary ==
My first novel for adult readers! Funny and baaad, Sandy Pressman was raised to lead a fifties life. You know... grow up, get a college degree in case, god forbid, you ever have to go to work, marry well, have children and....that's the problem...and what??? For Sandy, it's the summer she begins to question her choices and give in to her fantasies.

When Wifey was published some people thought I would never write another children's book, some thought I had written a real book at last, some were angry that I hadn't used a pseudonym, others that I even had such thoughts! Plus, I began to hear from old boyfriends. And those who wanted to be.

— Judy Blume
