= Forever (1978 film) =

- Genre: Drama; Romance
- Based on: Forever by Judy Blume
- Written by: AJ Carothers
- Directed by: John Korty
- Starring: Stephanie Zimbalist; Dean Butler; John Friedrich; Diana Scarwid
- Music by: Fred Karlin
- Country of origin: United States
- Original language: English

Production
- Executive producer: Roger Gimbel
- Producers: Merrit Malloy; Marc Trabulus
- Cinematography: David Myers
- Editor: Robert Dalva
- Running time: 96 minutes
- Production companies: EMI Television; Roger Gimbel Productions

Original release
- Network: CBS
- Release: January 6, 1978

Forever is a 1978 American made-for-television romantic drama film starring Stephanie Zimbalist and Dean Butler. It is based on the Judy Blume novel Forever... and premiered on CBS on January 6, 1978.

== Cast ==
- Stephanie Zimbalist as Katherine Danziger
- Dean Butler as Michael Wagner
- John Friedrich as Artie Lewin
- Beth Raines as Erica
- Diana Scarwid as Sybil Davidson

== Production ==
Filming took place at Lake Tahoe and Mill Valley.
