= Just as Long as We're Together (novel) =

1987 novel by Judy Blume

Just as Long as We’re Together
- First edition
- Author: Judy Blume
- Language: English
- Genre: Young adult novel
- Publisher: Orchard Books
- Publication date: 1987
- Publication place: United States
- Media type: Print (Paperback)
- Pages: 296 pp
- ISBN: 1-55736-046-4
- OCLC: 16900279
- Followed by: Here's to You, Rachel Robinson

Just as Long as We're Together is a young adult novel written by Judy Blume and published in 1987. It is a companion book to Here's to You, Rachel Robinson.

The novel is narrated by Stephanie Hirsch, who has several changes in her life happening at the same time. She is turning thirteen, her family has just moved, she is starting middle school, her parents are separating, she gains ten pounds over the holidays, she starts menstruating and becoming interested in boys, and her lifelong friendship with the overachieving Rachel Robinson (the later protagonist of Here's to You, Rachel Robinson) is threatened when new girl Alison Monceau moves to town. Stephanie really likes Alison and feels that Rachel is threatened when the twosome becomes a threesome.

== Allusions and references to other works ==
The novel's title is a reference from the popular 1927 song "Side by Side" by Gus Kahn and Harry M. Woods, which Stephanie learned at summer camp and teaches her friends. She chooses her favorite lines in the song:

"Through all kinds of weather
What if the sky should fall
Just as long as we're together
It doesn't matter now at all"
