= Letters to Judy =

Book by Judy Blume

Letters to Judy: What Kids Wish They Could Tell You
- First edition
- Author: Judy Blume
- Language: English
- Publisher: Putnam
- Publication date: 1986
- Publication place: United States
- Media type: Print
- ISBN: 0-399-13129-9

Letters to Judy: What Your Kids Wish They Could Tell You is a book published by Judy Blume in 1986. The book is a collection of letters from readers of her children's books, primarily children and teenagers, who wrote to Blume about problems like rejection by peers, feelings of neglect at home, or confusion about puberty, as well as more serious issues like living with disabilities, having family members be incarcerated, or surviving sexual abuse. Also included in the book are autobiographical essays about Blume's own experiences.

== Background ==
Blume, a popular author, received a great deal of mail from her young readers; in the 1980s, she said, she received about 2,000 letters per month. Some of these letters were standard fan mail, but many children wrote to her asking for advice about problems they were facing in their lives. Blume responded to many of these letters personally, offering her support; she would later write in the introduction to Letters to Judy: "Sometimes I become more emotionally involved in their lives than I should."

Ultimately, Blume decided to compile several of these letters into a book for parents to share with their children. Upon publishing the book, she pledged to donate all its royalties to the Kids Fund, a charitable foundation she founded in 1981, as she did not want to profit off her readers' confidences. Blume said the book was particularly hard for her to write. After finishing, she told the Los Angeles Times that she never wanted to write nonfiction again, and she would only publish one more work of nonfiction after it, 1988's The Judy Blume Memory Book.

For Letters to Judy, Blume changed the letter writers' names and some identifying details, and combined some letters into composites. The letters in the book are arranged loosely by subject, under subheadings such as "I Love My Parents, But...", "I Am Just Like Everyone Else, Except..." and "Boys and Girls Together." Blume had written about many of these topics in her children's fiction, with the exception of some of the more serious topics such as suicide.

Decades later, Blume said that publishing the book had inspired even more children to write to her about their lives.

== Critical reception ==
The book received positive reviews from outlets including The New York Times, The Washington Post, and Kirkus Reviews, praising its generosity and value to parents.
