= Here's to You, Rachel Robinson =

1993 novel by Judy Blume

Here’s to You, Rachel Robinson
- First edition
- Author: Judy Blume
- Language: English
- Genre: Young adult novel
- Publisher: Orchard Books
- Publication date: 1993
- Publication place: United States
- Media type: Print
- Pages: 196 pp
- ISBN: 0-531-06801-3
- OCLC: 28147467
- LC Class: PZ7.B6265 He 1993
- Preceded by: Just as Long as We're Together

Here's to You, Rachel Robinson is a 1993 young adult novel by Judy Blume, the sequel to Just as Long as We're Together. It is an allusion to the Simon and Garfunkel song, "Mrs. Robinson".

== Plot ==
This book is written from the perspective of Rachel Robinson, who is thirteen years old and the youngest child of three. She is regarded as an overachiever and perfectionist, but explains throughout the book that she finds it difficult being intellectually gifted, and uses her perfectionist behaviours as a coping mechanism to deal with problems with her family and with her insecurities regarding her friendships.

Her immediate family consists of her mother Nell, a high-achieving lawyer and later judge, her father Victor, a teacher with a gentle nature, her older sister Jessica, who suffers with cystic acne and the discrimination that comes with it, and her older brother Charles, who was expelled from boarding school and makes their lives a misery. Rachel feels Charles gets all the attention in her family, even if it is negative, and that he is driving their parents to the breaking point. She also resents that her brother gets so much attention from teenage girls, especially her friends, Stephanie and Alison.

In the book, Rachel has to deal with her crush on Charles's tutor, Paul Medeiros (who ends up dating their cousin Tarren), her worries that Stephanie and Alison prefer each other to her, her frequent invitations to join high-achieving school societies, and the fact that the best-looking boy in ninth grade (at least, to Stephanie, Alison, and Rachel), Jeremy "Dragon" Kravitz, may be interested in her. Through family counseling and a trip to Ellis Island, the Robinson family begin to learn how to put aside their differences and become a closer family.

== Allusions and references to other works ==
The novel's title is a reference to the Simon and Garfunkel song "Mrs. Robinson"; specifically the lines:

"And here's to you, Mrs. Robinson,
Jesus loves you more than you will know"

Judy Blume has stated on her website that she "had a terrible time coming up with a title for Rachel's story and I'm not happy with the one I finally chose which comes from a line in the book spoken angrily by Charles".

== Reception ==
Here's to You, Rachel Robinson was received positively by critics. Publishers Weekly and Kirkus Reviews praised the character dynamics and dialogue as "complex" yet "credible."
