= Summer Sisters =

1998 Judy Blume adult novel

- First edition
- Author: Judy Blume
- Language: English
- Publisher: Delacorte Books
- Publication date: 1998
- Publication place: United States
- Media type: Print
- Pages: 399 pp
- ISBN: 0-385-32405-7
- OCLC: 38239320
- Dewey Decimal: 813/.54 21
- LC Class: PS3552.L843 S8 1998

Summer Sisters is a 1998 novel by Judy Blume. It focuses on the life of two fictional characters, Victoria Leonard (Vix) and Caitlin Somers.

Because of its heavy sexual content, this Blume novel is aimed squarely at an adult audience, not her tween audience for which she gained popularity.

== Plot introduction ==
Summer Sisters is a coming-of-age novel about two friends, Caitlin Somers and Victoria "Vix" Leonard, who spend every summer together as teenagers. The girls are polar opposites, Caitlin being beautiful, lively and popular while Vix is a shy but intellectual wallflower. As the years progress the girls become closer and closer but soon find their friendship strained.

== Plot summary ==
The novel begins with a phone call from Caitlin to Vix. Caitlin calls to tell Vix that she is marrying Vix's ex-boyfriend and first love, Bru. Vix is shocked and becomes sick with the news.

In a flashback, the reader learns of Vix's family and the first encounter with Caitlin. Vix's home life consists of her controlling mother, Tawny, an average-joe father, and three younger siblings, Lanie, Lewis, and Vix's favorite: her wheelchair-using brother Nathan. Tawny works for a Countess and is always making Vix feel as though she is not good enough. Then, Vix meets Caitlin in her sixth-grade class, and Caitlin invites Vix to come to Martha's Vineyard with her for the summer. This turns Vix's world upside down.

After much debate, Vix convinces Tawny and her father to let her go with Caitlin. Vix flies out East from her New Mexico ranch and meets Caitlin's family: her laid-back father, Lambert "Lamb" Somers, her brother "Sharkey", and Trisha, an ex-girlfriend of Lamb's who is still close with him but has recently been replaced by Abby, a woman who means well but whom Caitlin dislikes. Abby's son, Daniel, and his friend, Gus, also vacation with Caitlin's family. This section focuses on the mishaps and adventures the kids go through, including Vix and Caitlin and their crushes on two older boys, Joseph "Bru" Brudegher and his cousin, Von.

When the summer ends, Caitlin and Vix remain friends and continue attending school together. They make it a tradition for Vix to spend every summer with Caitlin from then on, hence the "Summer Sisters." Eventually, Vix hooks up with Bru and Caitlin with Von. Then Vix makes out with Von while high. She thinks that Caitlin set up the whole scenario and they get into a huge argument. Just prior to her senior year of high school, Vix's beloved brother Nathan succumbs to his physical disabilities and dies as a result, leaving Vix devastated. Vix's younger sister, Lanie, becomes pregnant and has her first child, and Lewis joins the military. As the girls mature, they encounter their first heterosexual experiences (Caitlin with an Italian ski-instructor, then Von, supposedly) and Vix's in-depth and long-term relationship with Bru, which continues into her college years when she attends Harvard on a scholarship from The Somers Foundation. Caitlin is accepted to Wellesley College but chooses not to attend and travels abroad.

Vix goes to Harvard while still remaining in a relationship with Bru. She makes new friends, most notably Maia, her uptight roommate whose worrisome ways begin to grow on Vix, but they become close. However, things turn sour when Vix realizes she doesn't know what she wants in life and she and Bru temporarily break up during her Junior year of college. A few months later, a passionate meeting leads to their renewed faithfulness, but all's well does not end well. Just before graduation, Bru asks Vix to marry him, but she says no after realizing that they do not want the same things in life. Vix misses Bru, but moves on and casually dates other people, whilst Caitlin has numerous hetero and homosexual escapades in Europe. The girls keep in loose contact over the years, each becoming busy with her own life until the fateful day when Caitlin makes that phone call and tells Vix about her upcoming nuptials to Bru.

Caitlin invites Vix to the wedding, and she decides to go, only to end up sleeping with Bru the night before. Then, Vix discovers that Bru took not only her virginity but Caitlin's as well. As Bru thinks in the book, "he loves them both... he is glad they have decided for him [who he will be with.]" Caitlin and Bru get married nonetheless, and Caitlin has a daughter, Somers Mayhew Brudegher, whom they call "Maizie". Vix, meanwhile, reconnects with Abby's son Daniel's friend Gus, whom she spent all those summers with years ago at the vineyard. She and Gus slowly fall in love and eventually get married as well. In the final chapters, Vix visits Caitlin again after Caitlin has a breakdown and leaves her family, her marriage to Bru ending in divorce and Bru marrying Star, a local islander. Vix is pregnant with her first child at this time, a baby boy to be named Nate in honor of her late brother. Caitlin and Vix's meeting is relaxed and the two end up pledging to be best friends forever with each one truly grateful for the other's presence in her life.

Ultimately, while Vix enjoys motherhood and marriage, Caitlin mysteriously disappears after going out on a boat alone. The empty boat reveals no signs of foul play, leaving it ambiguous whether Caitlin intentionally vanished or tragically drowned. The novel closes with Vix fondly recounting the memories of her "summer sister," wishing things had ended differently.

== Reception ==
The Chicago Tribune observed that, "not surprisingly, Blume's at her best dealing with the girls' adolescence. She understands the way teens talk and worry and giggle. And she obviously knows what it's like to have a best friend with whom to share everything from clothes to secrets to late-night fears. Summer Sisters is as warm as the summer breeze blowing through your hair, as nostalgic as James Taylor singing "How Sweet It Is." You remember. So does Judy Blume. How sweet it was."

The Washington Post remarked on how, "in many ways, Summer Sisters is merely a more mature version of a Judy Blume book, reprising many of her favorite themes: coming of age, breast angst, divorce crises, the enigma of the other sex. [...] Despite mixed reviews, Blume's audience greeted Summer Sisters like a long-lost friend. With 480,000 copies in print [in August 1998], it's one of the season's most popular beach reads. But it's not, to be frank, the volume she'll be remembered for."

== TV adaptation ==
In early 2020, Hulu picked up the rights for a limited scripted series based on Summer Sisters following a bidding war with other TV outlets.
