= Tiger Eyes (film) =

- Directed by: Lawrence Blume
- Written by: Judy Blume; Lawrence Blume
- Produced by: Judy Blume; Lawrence Blume; George Cooper; Ruth Pomerance; Linda Moran; Rene Bastian
- Starring: Willa Holland; Amy Jo Johnson; Cynthia Stevenson; Tatanka Means; Elise Eberle; Russell Means
- Cinematography: Seamus Tierney
- Edited by: Jay Freund
- Music by: Nathan Larson
- Release dates: April 4, 2012 (Sonoma International Film Festival); June 7, 2013 (United States)
- Running time: 92 minutes
- Country: United States
- Box office: $27,160

Tiger Eyes is a 2012 film directed by Lawrence Blume based on the 1981 young adult novel of the same name, written by Judy Blume, and stars Willa Holland, Amy Jo Johnson and Tatanka Means. It follows the story of Davey, a young girl attempting to cope with the sudden death of her father and the subsequent uprooting of her life.

The film marks the first major motion picture adaptation from the work of author Judy Blume, whose books have sold more than 82 million copies in 41 countries.

== Plot ==
Forced by her grieving mother to move from her home in Atlantic City, New Jersey, to Los Alamos, New Mexico, Davey no longer knows who to be or how to fit in. Everything that once mattered, the friends, reputations, parties and expectations that fuel high school days, seems insignificant and Davey is certain no one has the first clue about the turmoil she is going through.

But when she meets Wolf, a Native American climber exploring the surrounding canyons, she feels he is able to see right into her most wild and secret emotions. Their intense relationship brings Davey back from the edge as she finds the courage to embark on the first adventure of her life.

== Cast ==
- Willa Holland as Davey Wexler
- Amy Jo Johnson as Gwen Wexler
- Tatanka Means as Wolf
- Elise Eberle as Jane Albertson
- Cynthia Stevenson as Aunt Bitsy
- Forest Fyre as Walter
- Teo Olivares as Reuben
- Russell Means as Mr. Ortiz

== Reception ==
On the review aggregator website Rotten Tomatoes, 63% of 30 critics' reviews are positive. Metacritic, which uses a weighted average, assigned the film a score of 56 out of 100, based on 12 critics, indicating "mixed or average" reviews.
