= Smart Women =

1983 novel by Judy Blume

- First edition
- Author: Judy Blume
- Language: English
- Publisher: Putnam
- Publication date: 1983
- Publication place: United States
- Media type: Print (Paperback)
- Pages: 288 pp
- ISBN: 0-399-12840-9
- OCLC: 9783725
- Dewey Decimal: 813/.54 19
- LC Class: PS3552.L843 S6 1983

Smart Women is a 1983 novel by Judy Blume that tells the story of a divorcee who falls for her friend's ex-husband.

== Plot summary ==
The story follows Margo and B.B., two divorcees who are trying to restart their lives in Boulder, Colorado, to the annoyance and amusement of their teenage daughters. Matters get much more complex and relationships strained when B.B.'s ex-husband moves next door to Margo and starts a relationship with him.

== Characters ==
- Margo Sampson - The main character and protagonist in the story. She is an architect.
- Francine Brady Broder (B.B.) - The antagonist in the story. She is a realtor.
- Andrew Broder - B.B.'s ex husband, author and Margo's potential love interest.
- Stuart Sampson- Margo's son. He is a high school senior.
- Sara Broder - B.B.'s daughter. She turns 13 years old in the story.
- Michelle Sampson - Margo's daughter. She is 17 years old. Her character is vulnerable which makes her easy to love and understand. She gives her mother a very hard time because she cares about her and just wants her to be happy. She does not want any more disruptions in their lives.

== Themes ==
The common theme in Smart Women is about divorce, change, love and a new start.

== Symbols ==
The children represent Judy Blume's sensitivity toward their feelings. Both Sara and Michelle are mentioned throughout the whole book. She makes it clear they come first when it comes to Margo's and B.B's decision making. Both daughters provide the humor and poignancy in the story.

== Bibliography ==
- Blume, Judy (1983). Smart Women. Penguin Group. ISBN 9780425206553.
