= Then Again, Maybe I Won't =

1971 novel by Judy Blume

- First edition
- Author: Judy Blume
- Language: English
- Genre: Young adult fiction
- Publisher: Bradbury Press
- Publication date: 1971
- Publication place: United States
- Media type: Print (Paperback)
- Pages: 176 pp
- ISBN: 0-87888-035-6
- OCLC: 211889
- LC Class: PZ7.B6265 Th

Then Again, Maybe I Won't is a young adult novel written by Judy Blume. Intended for pre-teens and teenagers, the novel deals with puberty from a 1970s male perspective as well as the other trials of growing up.

== Plot summary ==
Thirteen-year-old Tony Miglione lives with his blue-collar family in Jersey City, New Jersey. After his family becomes wealthy from his father's sale of his electronics invention, the family moves to the fictional upper-class community of Rosemont, New York, on Long Island. His mother becomes absorbed with advancing in the social hierarchy in the family's well-to-do community, while his maternal grandmother becomes angry and withdrawn when she is no longer allowed to cook for the household as she loves to do. Tony's older brother, Ralph, a new father who was previously a well-respected junior high school teacher, gives up teaching to make more money working in the same business as their father, making Tony feel his brother is 'selling out'.

Tony meets and befriends a neighbor, Joel Hoober, a boy his own age. While Joel's manners impress Mr. and Mrs. Miglione, Tony sees Joel's true colors in private: he secretly engages in such uncalled-for deportment as making goof calls, underage drinking, reading adult-oriented fiction, and shoplifting, and encourages Tony to participate in such antics as well.

Joel also has a sixteen-year old sister, Lisa, whose bedroom window faces Tony's. Tony thinks she's gorgeous. When Tony notices Lisa does not close her blinds when dressing and undressing, Tony asks his parents for a pair of binoculars for Christmas "for birdwatching". Tony experiences his first wet dream about her. However, Tony also has to deal with the fact that she is three years older than he is, and, that if such a crush developed further, the age difference would be uncommon among boys he knows.

Tony begins experiencing anxiety-related spells whenever Joel is shoplifting. During a trip downtown, Tony suspects Joel stole something and faints in public. He gets admitted to the hospital. After doctors determine the malady is not physical (although he is diagnosed with "nervous stomach", which might now be translated to IBS), a therapist offers to help Tony. The therapy helps Tony learn new ways to deal with his problems.

Joel is eventually caught stealing golf balls from a sporting goods store, and Tony refuses to stand up for him when they are stopped by security. Surprisingly, Joel is not angry at him and the two boys agree amicably to end their friendship when Joel is sent to a military academy; he explains to Tony that he acted out simply to see if he could get away with it. Tony's mother (who tries to emulate everything the Hoobers do) considers sending Tony there too, until Tony's father intervenes and says this is a key decision that only Tony should make. Tony also overcomes his infatuation with Lisa and curtails watching her window after learning that she and his youth group leader are sweethearts.

In the final chapter, Tony is bicycling and talking to himself about his parents building a swimming pool and he is approaching his 14th birthday. Tony is also now more at ease with himself and the family changes, and he had the courage to tell the therapist he spied on Lisa. Tony thinks it would be best if he ceases his voyeuristic behavior for good, but finally says to himself 'Then again, maybe I won't.'

== Major characters ==
- Anthony (Tony) Miglione – Protagonist of the book who is 12 (later 13) years old, the youngest of three boys.
- Victor (Vic) Miglione – Tony's father, who is a freelance electrician and an inventor whose invention changes their lives.
- Carmella Miglione – Tony's mother, who eventually goes by the name Carol, much to Tony's dismay. She becomes self-absorbed with her social status once the family moves to Rosemont.
- Ralph Miglione – Tony's older brother who is a teacher at his middle school in Jersey City, but goes into the family business with his father, which angers Tony to no end. Back in Jersey City, Ralph was respected amongst Tony's peers, known as "The Wizard of Seventh Grade Social Studies".
- Grandma – Carmella's mother, who cannot speak after having her larynx removed due to cancer. She loves to cook, but was no longer permitted to do so after hiring their housekeeper, so she spends every day in her bedroom watching TV, depressed.
- Vincent (Vinnie) Miglione – Tony's deceased eldest brother. He died in Vietnam a few years before the story takes place.
- Angie Miglione – Tony's sister-in-law and Ralph's wife.
- Vincenza (Vickie) Miglione – Tony's niece, and Angie and Ralph's daughter. She was named after Vinnie.
- Joel Hoober – Tony's new friend in Rosemont. He is a practical joker and a shoplifter.
- Marty Endo – One of Tony's new friends who is also one of his basketball teammates and a member of the church youth group.
- Scott Gold – Another new friend of Tony's, who is in all of Tony's classes at school. He is often seen with Tony, Marty Endo, and Joel Hoober as a group.
- Lisa Hoober – Joel's attractive 16-year-old sister, whom Tony develops a crush on, and spies on with binoculars via his window
- Kathryn (Corky) Thomas – A tomboyish girl of Tony's age who has a crush on him, but receives little attention from him.
- J.W. Fullerbach – Vic's new boss and business partner.
- Frankie Bollino – Tony's best friend from Jersey City who comes to visit.
- Dr. Fogel – Tony's psychiatrist.
- Maxine – Housekeeper to the Migliones who directs the house her way and will not let Tony's grandmother cook anymore. She eventfully softens as the book progresses.
- Millicent – Hispanic housekeeper to the Hoobers who seems to be the only one who is aware of Joel's misbehavior

== Development ==
Judy Blume said that she was inspired to write the story following the success of her preceding novel Are You There God? It's Me, Margaret. Given her earlier novel was about a girl entering puberty and making the transition to womanhood, she decided to write one about a boy going through puberty and making a transition to manhood: "I decided it would be interesting to try out life as a twelve-year-old boy".

== Theme ==
While this novel is similar to aspects of Are You There God? It's Me, Margaret., it differs mainly in the secondary themes. While Margaret struggles with her issues of religion and being raised in an interfaith family, Tony Miglione struggles with the issues of his family's social status, ethnicity, and to a lesser extent, American society. Themes dealt with include the effects on Tony of losing the working-class life he had been used to in his Italian-American neighborhood in Jersey City, and being ill at ease in his new upper-class community. In addition, Tony's grandmother has been marginalized, as she loved to cook for the family in Jersey City but is told that this would be inappropriate in their new home. She confines herself to her room after the Migliones hire Maxine, a maid who takes advantage of the family's inexperience with their new lifestyle and essentially directs the household to her tastes instead of taking orders from the family.

This novel addresses ethnic discrimination against Italian Americans, which is intertwined with the issue of middle class versus working class culture. Tony's family seems to be knowingly and willingly distancing themselves from their Italian heritage with their move, as not many Italian-Americans live in Rosemont. Tony's mother allows herself to be called "Carol" by Mrs. Hoober instead of Carmella, her true name, and his father trades in his work truck for a new car once Mrs. Hoober asks if they're "having something worked on," as pickup trucks were mostly only owned by those who needed them for their work in this period. Mr. Hoober is vice president of a pharmaceutical company and is apparently extremely well compensated, which gives his wife the chance to spend her days playing golf and socializing. The Hoobers are representative of the "high-powered American family" and seem to believe the "American way" is about money, materialism, affluent living, social status and not much else. As a result, they do not seem to give much attention to their trouble-making son Joel, who has the idea he can get away with anything because nobody is watching over him or enforcing discipline.

Another theme touched upon is Tony maintaining his respect for the working class life his parents left behind. For example, Tony and his friends are drinking milkshakes at a malt shop when Joel thinks it is funny to hide the tip inside a half-full milkshake glass, causing the waitress to put up a fuss and remark that "your crummy coins buy me a loaf of bread; ever stop and think of that". This causes Tony to reflect on the differences between where he was raised and where he is now, as well as the circular flow of income as he ponders the waitress taking that money to a bakery in a low-income part of town.

The penultimate chapter in the book deals with the consequences of Joel's immoral actions. Tony and Joel are at a sporting goods store where the employees catch Joel shoplifting golf balls and Tony refuses to aid Joel in lying. Tony anticipates that his parents will learn for themselves of Joel's true nature when they read the next day's newspaper and see Joel will be remanded to the juvenile facility, but is surprised when he learns the owner of the sporting goods store declines to press charges against Joel for shoplifting. Joel's father then decides to enroll Joel in a military academy, which he believes will cure Joel of his "I will do what I want, when I want" attitude and deprive him of his pampered lifestyle at the Hoober home.

== Setting ==
The time frame of this story is evidently the late 1960s or early 1970s, as Tony's eldest brother, Vinnie, has been killed in action in the Vietnam War. Initially set in Jersey City, New Jersey, the family eventually moves to Rosemont, New York on Long Island.

== Reception ==
Then Again was well-received by reviewers. Kirkus Reviews complimented Blume's treatment of puberty, calling it "refreshingly light and undemanding," and praising how problems were realistically resolved in the storyline. The New York Times wrote that "[Blume's] understanding of young people is sympathetic and psychologically sound; her skill engages the reader in human drama without ever resorting to melodrama." In a 1991 retrospective of Blume's work, The New York Times called Blume's depiction of a social-climbing suburban family "so incisive that it can be fully appreciated only by an adult," and noted that many young people of the author's generation learned about puberty from Then Again or Are You There God? It's Me, Margaret.

== Book ban ==
In 2023, the book was challenged but kept, in Clay County District Schools.

== Editions ==
- ISBN 0-87888-035-6
- ISBN 0-8161-4417-6
