= Are You There God? It's Me, Margaret. =

1970 novel by Judy Blume

- First edition cover
- Author: Judy Blume
- Language: English
- Genre: Contemporary realistic, coming-of-age
- Publisher: Bradbury Press
- Publication date: 1970
- Publication place: United States
- Media type: Print
- Pages: 171
- ISBN: 978-0-13-045856-8
- LC Class: MLCS 2006/13809 (P)

Are You There God? It's Me, Margaret. is a middle-grade novel by American writer Judy Blume, published in 1970. Its protagonist, Margaret Simon, is a sixth-grader who grows up without a religious affiliation because of her parents' interfaith marriage. This contemporary realistic novel was popular with middle-grade readers in the 1970s for its relatable portrayal of a young girl confronting early-adolescent anxieties, such as menstruation, puberty, bras, and boys. The recipient of national honors and book awards, the novel has been challenged for its frank discussion of sexual and religious topics.

The book was adapted into a 2023 film of the same name starring Abby Ryder Fortson, Rachel McAdams, and Kathy Bates.

== Background ==
Blume said that she felt a connection with the character Margaret, which allowed the story to come "pouring out." Blume wrote that while the story was not autobiographical, "the character of Margaret, both physically and emotionally, is pretty close to the girl I was." Growing up, Blume said while her family was very different from the one portrayed in the book, she felt that, "like Margaret, I had a very personal relationship with God that had little to do with organized religion."

== Plot ==
When she is 11 years old, Margaret Simon's family moves from New York City to the New Jersey suburbs. Her mother is Christian and her father is Jewish, but Margaret was raised without an affiliation to either faith. She frequently prays to God, beginning her prayers with, "Are you there God? It's me, Margaret."

Margaret feels uncomfortable with her lack of religious affiliation. For a school assignment, she studies religious beliefs, hoping to resolve her faith-based issues. Her study includes attending different places of worship to learn about religious practices. Her Jewish grandmother, Sylvia Simon, takes Margaret to Rosh Hashanah services and hopes her granddaughter will embrace Judaism.

Margaret befriends Nancy, a neighbor who is the same age. Nancy seems confident and knowledgeable about many subjects, including sex and kissing. Nancy, Margaret, and their friends Gretchen and Janie form a secret club called the Pre-Teen Sensations. The Pre-Teen Sensations discuss boys, brassieres and menstruation. The girls anxiously await their first period, preparing by buying belted sanitary napkins. (Note: Changed to adhesive pads in later editions of the book) They also perform exercises to increase their bust sizes while chanting: "We must, we must, we must increase our bust!"

Gretchen has her first menstrual period, which causes Margaret to worry that she is abnormal because she has not started menstruating. Margaret envies her classmate, Laura Danker, who started menstruating and wears a brassiere. According to Nancy, Laura dates an older boy. The Pre-Teen Sensations gossip about Laura letting boys touch her breasts. Margaret feels guilty when she learns that Laura is a devout Catholic and is hurt by the rumors. Margaret is attracted to a popular boy in her class named Philip Leroy. They kiss while playing "two minutes in the closet" during a party. Nancy lies to the Pre-Teen Sensations that she had her first menstrual period when away on vacation. Margaret discovers the truth when they are at a restaurant, and Nancy gets her actual first menstrual period.

Margaret's family plans to spend the spring vacation with Sylvia in Florida. The day before the family's vacation, Margaret's conservative Christian grandparents, Mary and Paul Hutchins, visit. Because they disapprove of their daughter's interfaith marriage, Mary and Paul have been estranged from Margaret's mother for fourteen years. Margaret's mother cancels the Florida vacation, saying that "it's not the end of the world" and that they can always go to Florida another time. Margaret is upset but tries to be polite to her grandparents. When her grandparents mention religion, a heated argument ensues, during which Margaret angrily declares that she does not need religion or God.

Margaret then stops talking to God. By the end of her school project, she still has not resolved her religious identity. However, she has learned about herself and has become more comfortable with her lack of affiliation. On the last day of school, Margaret gets her first menstrual period. Relieved, she resumes her relationship with God, saying, "I know you're there God. I know you wouldn't have missed this for anything! Thank you, God. Thanks an awful lot...."

== Main characters ==
- Margaret Simon – the eleven-year-old protagonist
- Barbara Simon (born Hutchins) – Margaret's mother
- Herbert Simon – Margaret's father
- Sylvia Simon – Margaret's Jewish paternal grandmother
- Nancy Wheeler – Margaret's neighbor and first friend in New Jersey, a member of the Pre-Teen Sensations. She is also 11 years old
- Gretchen Potter – Margaret's friend and the first member of the Pre-Teen Sensations to get her period
- Janie Loomis – Margaret's friend and a member of the Pre-Teen Sensations
- Evan Wheeler – Nancy's older brother
- Moose Freed – Evan's friend who cuts the Simon family's lawn and is Margaret's crush
- Miles J. Benedict – Margaret's sixth-grade teacher
- Laura Danker – a classmate of Margaret's who is tall and developed for her age
- Philip Leroy – a classmate of Margaret's whom she likes at first

== Awards and honors ==
In 1970, The New York Times selected Are You There God? It's Me, Margaret. as the Outstanding Book of the Year.

In 2010, Time included Are You There God? It's Me, Margaret. in its All-Time 100 Novels written in English since 1923. The magazine wrote, "Blume turned millions of pre-teens into readers. She did it by asking the right questions—and avoiding pat, easy answers."

Scholastic selected the novel for its 100 Greatest Books for Kids/100 Must-Read Books.

== Censorship in the United States ==
Beginning in the 1970s, Are You There God? It's Me, Margaret. has been frequently challenged because of its frank talk about menstruation and its depiction of a child being allowed to decide for herself what religion she would prefer to adhere to. The American Library Association's (ALA) list of the 100 most frequently challenged books of the 1990s ranked the book at number sixty. The novel ranked 99 on ALA's list of the 100 most frequently challenged books of the 2000s. The book dropped from the ALA list for 2010 through 2020.

== Subsequent book ==
Blume's success with Are You There God? It's Me, Margaret. inspired her to write Then Again, Maybe I Won't, a novel focused on similar themes from a boy's perspective. The narrator of Then Again, Maybe I Won't is Tony Miglione, a twelve-year-old boy who is also dealing with puberty.

== Popular culture ==
The book has been referenced in a number of media including Chuck Palahniuk's novel Damned, television shows such as Ted Lasso, The Simpsons, South Park, The Venture Bros., Summerland, and the television series Lost.

The book is also referenced in the film Deadpool, Talladega Nights: The Ballad of Ricky Bobby, Chelsea Handler's book, Are You There, Vodka? It's Me, Chelsea, in 2008, and Ellen Coyne's Are You There God? It's Me, Ellen, in 2020.

Other television references have included Family Guy, Supernatural, Bob's Burgers, and Scrubs.

Captain Underpants and the Perilous Plot of Professor Poopypants, by Dav Pilkey, references the book in a chapter title, after George and Harold's names are legally changed to Fluffy Toiletnose and Cheeseball Wafflefanny: "Are You There, God? It's Us, Fluffy and Cheeseball."

== Film adaptation ==
In 1998, a short film starring Melissa McCarthy called God was produced, and is loosely based on the novel as McCarthy's character is named Margaret and the film showcases the character's relationship with God.

In October 2018, a film adaptation of the book was in the early stages of development by James L. Brooks and Kelly Fremon Craig. In 2020, Lionsgate won the rights to adapt the film at auction, allocating it a budget of $30 million. In April 2021, Lionsgate started filming in Charlotte, North Carolina. Production concluded on July 1, 2021. Judy Blume was one of the film's producers, and she claims it is better than the book. The film was released on April 28, 2023, to widespread critical acclaim.
