= Judy Blume =

American author (born 1938)

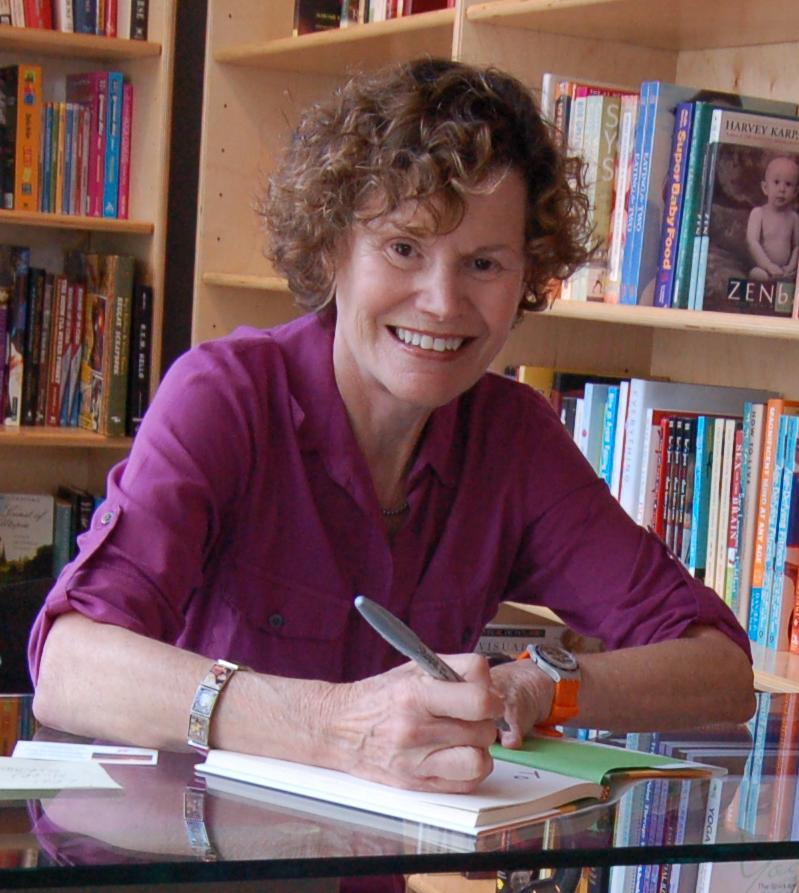
- Blume at a book signing in 2009
- Born: Judith Marcia Sussman; February 12, 1938 (age 88); Elizabeth, New Jersey, U.S.
- Education: Boston University; New York University (BA)
- Spouses: John M. Blume (m. 1959; div. 1975) Thomas A. Kitchens (m. 1976; div. 1978) George Cooper (m. 1987)
- Children: 2
- Writing career
- Period: 1969–2020
- Genres: Realist young adult novels, children's books
- Notable works: Tiger Eyes; Are You There God? It's Me, Margaret.; Tales of a Fourth Grade Nothing; Blubber; Double Fudge
- Notable awards: Margaret Edwards Award; 1996
- Website: judyblume.com

Signature
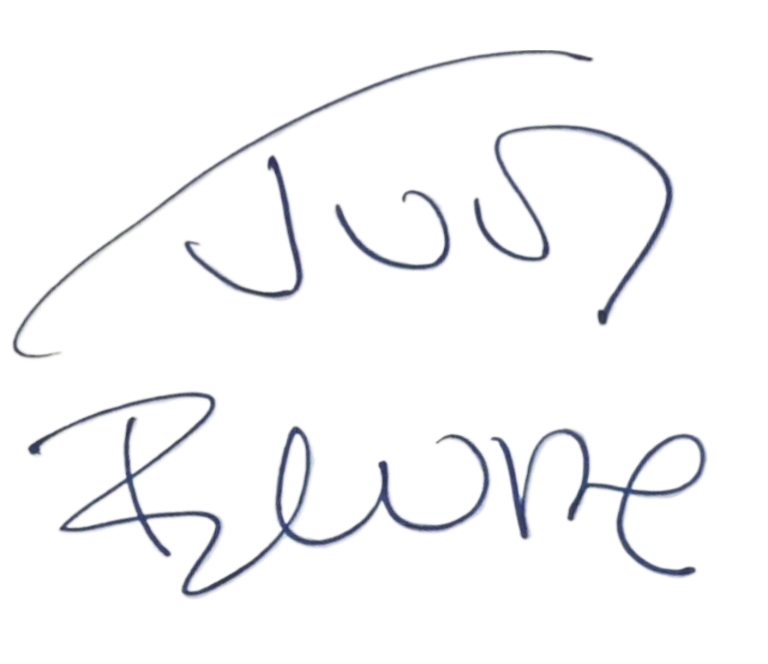

Judith Marcia Blume (née Sussman; born February 12, 1938) is an American writer of children's, young adult, and adult fiction. She began writing in 1959 and has published more than 26 novels. Among her best-known works are Superfudge (1980), Are You There God? It's Me, Margaret. (1970), Tales of a Fourth Grade Nothing (1972), Deenie (1973), Blubber (1974) and Double Fudge (2002). Blume's books have significantly contributed to children's and young adult literature. She was named one of the 100 most influential people in the world by Time magazine in 2023.

Blume was born and raised in Elizabeth, New Jersey, and graduated from New York University in 1961. Seeking to explore a creative outlet that would complement her role as a homemaker, Blume began writing stories.

Blume was one of the first young adult authors to write novels focused on such controversial topics as masturbation, menstruation, teen sex, birth control, and death. Her novels have sold over 82 million copies and have been translated into 32 languages.

Blume's novels have been praised for teaching children and young adults about their bodies. However, in the United States, the topics of her works have generated criticism, controversy and she is one of the most frequently banned authors in US schools and libraries.

There have been several film adaptations of Blume's novels, including Tiger Eyes, released in 2012 with Willa Holland starring as Davey, and Are You There God? It's Me, Margaret., released in 2023. A large collection of her papers is held at the Beinecke Rare Book & Manuscript Library at Yale University.

== Early life and education ==
Blume was born Judith Marcia Sussman on February 12, 1938, and raised in Elizabeth, New Jersey in a Jewish family, the daughter of homemaker Esther Sussman (née Rosenfeld) and dentist Rudolph Sussman. She has a brother, David, who is five years older. Blume described her upbringing as culturally rather than religiously Jewish.

Blume witnessed hardships and death throughout her childhood. When she was in third grade, Blume's older brother had a kidney infection that led Blume, her brother, and her mother to temporarily move to Miami Beach to help him recover for two years. Blume's father stayed behind to continue working but flew to Florida monthly to visit the family.

Additionally, in 1951 and 1952, there were three airplane crashes in her hometown of Elizabeth (1951 Miami Airlines C-46 crash, American Airlines Flight 6780, and National Airlines Flight 101). A total of 121 people died in these crashes, and Blume's father, who was a dentist, helped to identify the unrecognizable remains. Blume says that she "buried" these memories until she began writing her 2015 novel In the Unlikely Event, the plot of which revolves around the crashes.

Throughout her childhood, Blume was actively involved in many creative activities such as dance and piano. Blume has recalled spending much of her childhood creating stories in her head. Despite the love of stories, Blume did not dream of being a writer growing up as middle-class white women like her were encouraged to marry and have children.

She graduated from the all-girls' Battin High School in 1956 and enrolled in Boston University. A few weeks into the first semester, she was diagnosed with mononucleosis and took a leave from school. She later transferred to New York University, where she lived in a dormitory on Washington Square Park. In 1959, Blume's father died suddenly of a heart attack. One month after her father's death, on August 15, 1959, she married lawyer John M. Blume, whom she had met through college friends. Blume graduated from New York University in 1961 with a bachelor's degree in early education. The Blumes lived in New York City prior to having children.

== Career ==
A lifelong avid reader, Blume first began writing through New York University courses when her children were attending preschool. Following two years of publisher rejections, Blume published her first book, The One in the Middle Is the Green Kangaroo, in 1969. followed by her second book, Iggie's House (1970), which was adapted from a story she wrote for Trailblazer magazine. The decade that followed proved to be her most prolific, with 13 more books being published. Her third book, Are You There God? It's Me, Margaret. (1970), was a breakthrough best-seller and a trailblazing novel in young adult literature and established Blume as a leading voice in young adult literature. Some of Blume's other novels during the decade include Tales of a Fourth Grade Nothing (1972), Otherwise Known as Sheila the Great (1972), and Blubber (1974).

In 1975, Blume published Forever..., which depicted teen sex as normal. Blume explained that she was inspired to write this novel when her daughter, 13 years old at the time, said she wanted to read a book where the characters have sex but do not die afterward. These novels tackled complex subjects such as family conflict, bullying, body image, and sexuality. Blume has expressed that she writes about these subjects, particularly sexuality, because it is what she believes children need to know about and was what she wondered about as a child.

In addition to writing for younger audiences, Blume published works for adults, including Wifey (1978) and Smart Women (1983) which reached the top of The New York Times Best Seller list. Blume's third adult novel, Summer Sisters (1998), was widely praised and sold more than three million copies. Despite its popularity, Summer Sisters (1998) faced a lot of criticism for its sexual content and inclusion of homosexual themes. Several of Blume's books appear on the list of top all-time bestselling children's books. As of 2020, her books have sold over 82 million copies and they have been translated into 32 languages. Although Blume has not published a novel since 2015 (In the Unlikely Event), she continues to write. In October 2017, Yale University acquired Blume's archive, which included some unpublished early work.

As well as writing, Blume has been an activist against the banning of books in the United States. In the 1980s, when her books started facing censorship and controversy, she began reaching out to other writers, as well as teachers and librarians, to join the fight against censorship. This led Blume to join the National Coalition Against Censorship which aims to protect the freedom to read. As of 2020, Blume is still a board member for the National Coalition Against Censorship. She is also the founder and trustee of The Kids Fund, a charitable and educational foundation. Blume serves on the board for other organizations such as the Authors Guild; the Society of Children's Book Writers and Illustrators; and the Key West Literary Seminar.

== Reception ==
Blume's novels have been read by millions and have flourished throughout generations. The element in her work readers are said to love most is Blume's openness and honesty regarding issues like divorce, sexuality, puberty, and bullying. Her first-person narrative writing has gained positive appraisal for its relatability and its ability to discuss difficult subjects without judgment or harshness. Following the publishing of Are You There God? It's Me, Margaret. (1970), Blume received many letters from young girls telling her how much they loved the book and identified with Margaret. Female novelists have praised Blume for her “taboo-trampling” literature that left readers feeling like they learned something about their bodies from reading her books. For example, Deenie (1973) explained masturbation and Forever (1975) taught young women about losing their virginity. Blume's children's books have also been praised for their delicate way of portraying the hardships that kids can face at a young age. It’s Not the End of the World (1972) helped many kids understand divorce and the Fudge book series explored the various aspects of loving siblings despite the rivalry.

Blume's novels have received much criticism and controversy. Parents, librarians, book critics, and political groups have wanted her books to be banned. When her first books were published in the 1970s, Blume has recalled facing little censorship. Since 1980, Blume's novels have been a central topic of controversy in young adult literature. Critics of Blume's novels say that she places too much emphasis on the physical and sexual sides of growing up, ignoring the development of morals and emotional maturity. Five of Blume's books were included in the American Library Association (ALA) list of the top 100 most banned books of the 1990s, with Forever (1975) in seventh place. Forever is censored for its inclusion of teen sex and birth control. Blume recalls that the principal of her children's elementary school would not put Are You There God? It’s Me, Margaret in the library because the story involves menstruation. Conservative and religious groups continuously attempt to ban Are You There God? It’s Me, Margaret for the novel's portrayal of a young girl going through puberty claiming that it violates certain religious views. Blume's children's novels have also been criticized for these reasons, especially Blubber (1974), which many believed sent the message to readers that kids could do wrong and not face punishment.

== Media adaptations ==
The first media adaptation of Blume's novels was the production of a TV film based on Blume's novel Forever that premiered on CBS in 1978. Forever is the story of two teenagers in high school, Katherine Danziger and Michael Wagner, who fall in love for the first time. The film starred Stephanie Zimbalist as Katherine Danziger and Dean Butler as Michael Wagner. A decade later, in 1988, Blume and her son wrote and executive produced a small film adaptation of Otherwise Known as Sheila the Great. The film was later shown on ABC. In 1995, a Fudge TV series was produced based on Blume's novel Fudge-a-Mania. The show ran from 1995 to 1997 with the first season aired on ABC and the second on CBS. The series starred Jake Richardson as Peter Warren Hatcher, the storyteller, and Luke Tarsitano as Farley Drexel "Fudge" Hatcher.

In 2012, Blume's 1981 novel Tiger Eyes was adapted into a film version. This was the first of Blume's novels to be turned into a theatrical feature film. Tiger Eyes is the story of a teenage girl, Davey, who struggles to cope with the sudden death of her father, Adam Wexler. The screenplay was co-written by Blume and her son, Lawrence Blume, who was also the director. Tiger Eyes stars Willa Holland as Davey and Amy Jo Johnson as Gwen Wexler.

Blume is the subject of the 2018 song "Judy Blume" by Amanda Palmer. Thematically, the song explains to the listener Blume's role in Palmer's adolescent life. The song explains Blume's books as influential in Palmer's understanding of intimate and female-centered subjects such as puberty, menstruation, and the male gaze, and universal subjects like molestation, eating disorders, poverty, grief, and parental divorce.

Blume is the subject of the Peabody Award-winning documentary Judy Blume Forever, which premiered at the 2023 Sundance Film Festival.

Are You There God? It's Me, Margaret. was released as a feature film, directed by Kelly Fremon Craig, in 2023. It has been banned in schools and libraries because of its honest discussion of female puberty and sexuality, and portrayal of religious bias.

In 2025, Blume's novel Forever was adapted into a Netflix series show.

== Personal life ==
After returning to New Jersey, Blume gave birth to her daughter, Randy Lee Blume, in 1961 and became a homemaker. She gave birth to her son Lawrence Andrew Blume in 1963. When Blume's children began attending school, she began pursuing creative outlets, initially with felt art, some of which she sold to Bloomingdale's in New York City, before turning to writing.

Blume divorced her first husband, John M. Blume, in 1975. She married physicist Thomas A. Kitchens in 1976, and moved to London and then Los Alamos, New Mexico for two years for Kitchens' work. They got divorced in 1978.

In 1987 Blume met George Cooper, a Columbia University law professor turned non-fiction writer. They were married in 1987. Cooper has one daughter from a previous marriage, Amanda, to whom Blume is very close.

In August 2012, Blume announced that she was diagnosed with breast cancer after undergoing a routine ultrasound before leaving for a five-week trip to Italy. Six weeks after her diagnosis, Blume underwent a mastectomy and breast reconstruction. Blume was cancer-free following this surgery and able to recover.

Her daughter Randy Blume became a therapist with a sub-specialty in helping writers complete their works. She has one child, Elliot Kephart, who is credited with encouraging his grandmother, Judy Blume, to write the most recent "Fudge" books. Lawrence Blume is now a movie director, producer, and writer. As of 2021, Cooper and Blume resided in Key West, where they co-own a bookstore located in the arts center within The Studios of Key West.

== Awards and honors ==
Judy Blume has won more than 90 literary awards, including three lifetime achievement awards in the United States. In 1994, she received the Golden Plate Award of the American Academy of Achievement. The ALA Margaret A. Edwards Award recognizes one author who has made significant contributions to young adult literature. Blume won the annual award in 1996 and the ALA considered her book Forever, published in 1975, was groundbreaking for its honest portrayal of high school seniors in love for the first time.

In April 2000, the Library of Congress named her to its Living Legends in the Writers and Artists category for her significant contributions to America's cultural heritage. Blume received an honorary doctor of arts degree from Mount Holyoke College and was the main speaker at their annual commencement ceremony in 2003.

In 2004 she received the annual Distinguished Contribution to American Letters Medal of the National Book Foundation for her enrichment of American literary heritage. In 2009, the National Coalition Against Censorship (NCAC) honored Blume for her lifelong commitment to free speech and her courage to battle censorship in literature. Blume also received the 2017 E.B. White Award from the American Academy of Arts and Letters for lifetime achievement in children's literature. In 2020, Blume was named an Honoree for Distinguished Service to the Literary Community by the Authors Guild Foundation.

=== Other awards ===
Blume's other awards include:

- 1970: Outstanding Book of the Year from The New York Times for Are You There God? It’s Me, Margaret
- 1974: Outstanding Book of the Year from The New York Times for Blubber
- 1981: Children’ Choice Award from the International Reading Association and Children's’ Book Council for Superfudge
- 1983: Eleanor Roosevelt Humanitarian Award
- 1984: Carl Sandberg Freedom to Read Award, from the Chicago Public Library
- 1986: Civil Liberties Award from the Atlanta Civil Liberties Union
- 1988: South Australian Youth Media Award for Best Author
- 2005: Time magazine All-Time 100 Novels List for Are You There God? It’s Me, Margaret
- 2009: University of Southern Mississippi Medallion for lifelong contributions to children's literature
- 2010: Inducted into New Jersey Hall of Fame
- 2010: Inducted into Harvard Lampoon
- 2011: Smithsonian Associates: The McGovern Award
- 2013: Chicago Tribune: Young Adult Literary Prize
- 2013: New Atlantic Independent Booksellers Association (NAIBA) Legacy Award
- 2013: The NAIBA Legacy Award
- 2013: Assembly on Literature for Adolescents (ALAN) Award
- 2013: National Coalition of Teachers of English (NCTE) National Intellectual Freedom Award
- 2015: Catholic Library Association: Regina Award
- 2018: Carl Sandburg Literary Award from the Chicago Public Library Foundation
- 2025: Women's National Book Association: WNBA Award

=== Biography ===
Journalist Mark Oppenheimer published a biography called Judy Blume: A Life with publisher G.P. Putnam's Sons in 2026.

== Works ==
=== Children's books ===
- The One in the Middle Is the Green Kangaroo (1969)
- Iggie's House (1970)
- Tales of a Fourth Grade Nothing (1972)
- Otherwise Known as Sheila the Great (1972)
- The Pain and the Great One (1974)
- Starring Sally J. Freedman as Herself (1977)
- Freckle Juice (1978)
- Superfudge (1980)
- Fudge-a-Mania (1990)
- Double Fudge (2002)
- Soupy Saturdays with the Pain and the Great One (2007)
- Cool Zone with the Pain and the Great One (2008)
- Going, Going, Gone! With the Pain and the Great One (2008)
- Friend or Fiend? With the Pain and the Great One (2008)

=== Young adult books ===
- Are You There God? It's Me, Margaret. (1970)
- Then Again, Maybe I Won't (1971)
- It's Not the End of the World (1972)
- Deenie (1973)
- Blubber (1974)
- Forever... (1975)
- Tiger Eyes (1981)
- Just as Long as We're Together (1987)
- Here's to You, Rachel Robinson (1993)
- Places I Never Meant to Be (1999) (editor)

=== Adult books ===
- Wifey (1978)
- Smart Women (1983)
- Summer Sisters (1998)
- In the Unlikely Event (2015)

=== Collaborative short stories ===
- It's Fine to Be Nine (2000)
- It's Heaven to Be Seven (2000)

=== Non-fiction books ===
- The Judy Blume Diary (1981)
- Letters to Judy: What Your Kids Wish They Could Tell You (1986)
- The Judy Blume Memory Book (1988)
