= Forever... (novel) =

1975 novel by Judy Blume

- First edition
- Author: Judy Blume
- Language: English
- Genre: Young adult
- Publisher: Bradbury Press
- Publication date: 1975
- Publication place: United States
- Media type: Print (Hardback & Paperback)
- Pages: 224

Forever... is a 1975 novel by Judy Blume dealing with teenage sexuality. Because of the novel's content it has been the frequent target of censorship and appears on the American Library Association list of the 100 Most Frequently Challenged Books of 1990–2000 at number seven.

The three ellipsis points at the end of the title are part of the title, and relate to the central theme of the novel.

== Plot summary ==
In Westfield, New Jersey, high school senior Katherine attends a New Year's Eve party where she meets and is attracted to Michael, a student at a nearby school. As their relationship unfolds, the issue of sex is a more emotional and health issue than a moral one. They realize that physical intimacy is both common and complicated.

Their relationship progresses slowly as they date, often accompanied by Katherine's friend, Erica, who believes sex is a physical act and not very romantic. Erica believes Katherine should "just get it out of the way." Michael's friend, Artie, also accompanies them, and later gets together with Erica.

Katherine is reluctant and cautious regarding intercourse. When Michael reaches inside her panties, she stops him. Even though he says they can satisfy each other without actual intercourse, she stops his fondling. Katherine and Michael go on a skiing trip and plan to have sex, but are prevented when Katherine has her period, disappointing them.

Gradually, their intimacy increases. When Katherine has an orgasm, she asks Michael how to do the same for him. Michael teaches Katherine how to hold and stroke his penis (nicknamed "Ralph") until he ejaculates. Their growing intimacy includes mutual masturbation. Days later, when Katherine and Michael have sex (penetrative intercourse) using a condom, Katherine is not physically satisfied, but they are certain it seals a love that is "forever". A few weeks later, now using birth control pills, Katherine reaches orgasm when she and Michael have sex. Michael buys Katherine a necklace for her birthday that says "Katherine" on one side and "Forever...Michael" on the other.

That summer, both of Katherine's and Michael's parents find jobs for them in different states: Katherine will be a tennis counselor at a summer camp in Vermont, and Michael will work at a lumber mill in North Carolina. While they are apart, Katherine realizes the relationship's limitations and becomes attracted to an older tennis instructor named Theo. Katherine resists her attraction to him, but after her grandfather's death, Theo is the first person she turns to for comfort. They kiss and Theo pulls away. When Katherine does not answer Michael's letters, he shows up at her camp, only to find her holding hands with Theo.

At a motel room later that night, Katherine is unresponsive, and Michael understands she is involved with someone else. She tries to return the necklace, but he gives it back before driving off in a near-rage.

The book ends with a final chance meeting between Michael and Katherine, in which Katherine tries to convey with her eyes that she does not regret the relationship, but she is not ready for "forever". At home, Katherine's mother tells her that Theo called.

== Characters ==
Katherine Danziger Protagonist of the book. Katherine turns 18 and is a high school senior who is getting ready for college. When she meets Michael, she falls in love with him, and they start a relationship. One of the novel's central plot lines is her decision to lose her virginity to him, as well as the sexual relationship they share together. After she breaks off with Michael, she starts a relationship with Theo.

Michael Wagner The boy who Katherine meets and with whom Katherine falls in love. He is a senior at a nearby high school. They meet at a New Year's Eve Party, and their relationship develops from there. Michael wants to make love to Katherine, and after some impatience, agrees to wait until she is ready. He nicknames his penis "Ralph." They manage to hold a relationship together for a few months before it falls apart.

Erica Small Katherine's best friend, who provides her with emotional support owing to Erica's ability to see situations from a realistic point of view. She sees sex as a physical act, not a romantic one, unlike Katherine, and just wants her to get it over with.

Artie Lewin A boy who is friends with Katherine and Michael. He is a talented actor who wins a scholarship to a drama academy, and a repressed homosexual who does not respond to Erica's romantic/sexual signals. Over the course of the story, he sinks into depression, which is not helped when his father forbids him to accept the drama scholarship. After a suicide threat and attempt, he is committed to a mental hospital. In September, Michael says "He's home; I saw him last week," but no more is said about his condition.

Sybil Davison Katherine's friend (and Erica's cousin) who later gets pregnant when having loveless intercourse because she wants to have experience in giving birth. She doesn't tell her parents because she knows they would have wanted her to have an abortion. Sybil puts the baby girl up for adoption, hoping that the baby’s adoptive parents will name her Jennifer.

Jamie Danziger Katherine's little sister by 5 years. She is proficient in music, art, and cooking. She is in the seventh grade and looks a lot like Katherine. Katherine used to be jealous of Jamie for her artistic ability, but it passed.

Roger Danziger Katherine's father, a pharmacist who owns two drug stores.

Diana Danziger (née Gross) Katherine's mother, a librarian. She gives Katherine sexual advice, and says that losing your virginity is a serious thing.

Hallie Gross Katherine's maternal grandmother, a lawyer and progressive liberal.

Ivan Gross Katherine's maternal grandfather, who has had a stroke; he must walk with a cane and is sometimes at a loss for words. A second stroke kills him.

Theo An older boy who Katherine inadvertently falls for while working at a camp, which spells the end of her relationship with Michael.

David A boy Jamie falls in love with, and starts a relationship with.

== Reception ==
On November 5, 2019, the BBC News listed Forever... on its list of the 100 most influential novels.

=== Awards ===
| Year | Award | Result | Ref. |
|---|---|---|---|
| 1996 | Margaret A. Edwards Award | Winner | |
| 1975 | Best Book of the Year Award | Runner Up | |

=== Controversy ===
Forever... has frequently been banned in schools and libraries due to its detailed depictions of sexual intercourse, and because the protagonist, Katherine, uses birth control. Criticism of the novel often comes from religious groups and pro-abstinence groups who consider the use of 'the pill' unsuitable. The American Library Association's Office for Intellectual Freedom started tracking the most banned and challenged books in the United States in the 1990s and found that Forever... landed in the top 100 banned and challenged books from 1990–1999 (7th), as well as from 2000–2009 (16th). In 2005, the book was the second most banned and challenged book in the United States.

In August 2024, it was one of 13 books banned statewide by Utah's state board of education, allegedly for its "objective sensitive material."

In 2024 the book was banned in Texas by the Katy Independent School District on the basis that the novel is "adopting, supporting, or promoting gender fluidity" despite also pronouncing a bullying policy that protects infringements on the rights of the student.

== Adaptations ==
The book was adapted for American television in 1978, featuring Stephanie Zimbalist as Katherine and Dean Butler as Michael.

In June 2004, the Sacred Fools Theater Company performed a comic adaption of Forever for their Get Lit! series.

In November 2022, Netflix announced that it had commissioned a television series adaptation, with Mara Brock Akil serving as showrunner and executive producer under her overall deal. On January 30, 2025, Netflix dropped a first-look teaser for the show. The series was released on Netflix on May 8, 2025.

== See also ==
- List of most commonly challenged books in the United States
