= It's Not the End of the World =

1972 novel by Judy Blume

- First edition
- Author: Judy Blume
- Language: English
- Genre: Young adult novel
- Publisher: Bradbury
- Publication date: 1972
- Publication place: United States
- Media type: Print (Paperback)
- Pages: 169 pp
- ISBN: 0-87888-042-9
- OCLC: 49038737

It's Not the End of the World is a young adult novel written by Judy Blume, published in 1972.

== Plot summary ==
Karen Newman feels like her world is coming undone and has soured on the idea of marriage. In her diary, she gives each day a letter grade; lately, her days have not been graded higher than a C-minus. She is overjoyed to learn that her sixth-grade teacher will be Miss Pace, who is nice and popular, but when the first day of school comes, she is crushed to find that Miss Pace, after getting married over the summer and is now Mrs. Singer, has become what Karen describes as a "witch". Worse yet, her parents, Bill and Ellie, who have been quarreling more and more each day, announce that they are splitting up. Bill moves out of the family home and plans to go to Las Vegas to file for divorce, much to Ellie's delight and Karen's consternation.

When Karen's older brother, Jeff, finds out that Bill is going to Las Vegas, he argues with Ellie and runs away. Bill postpones his trip to Las Vegas to help find him, which, instead of bringing him closer to Ellie, causes him to quarrel with her even more violently than before. Jeff eventually returns on his own, ending the crisis, but not the animosity. Karen tries every possible way she can think of to stop the divorce from happening, including sending anniversary cards and feigning illness, but her efforts are ultimately fruitless. She does this because there is a streak run by her family for not getting a divorce. She does not want to let her grandparents down. At the end, she decides that, in spite of the impending divorce, things will get better. Her last diary entry in the book has her giving the day a B-plus.

== Characters ==
- Karen Newman — the protagonist, who is frightened and confused by her parents' impending divorce.
- Debbie Bartell — Karen's best friend. She is described as a pretty, funny, and delightful person and is good at making monkey faces. She has a crush on Karen's older brother, Jeff, who teases her.
- Eleanor "Ellie" Robinson Newman — Karen's mother.
- William "Bill" Newman — Karen's father.
- Gary Owens — the boy Karen had a crush on until he moves to Texas. Although not confirmed, she thinks he likes Debbie.
- Mrs. Singer — Karen's teacher. According to Karen, she was nice and popular, but after getting married over the summer, she became a "witch".
- Jeffrey "Jeff" Newman — Karen's older brother. A handsome 14-year-old, he is interested in girls and weightlifting. He enjoys playfully teasing Debbie, who likes him.
- Amy Newman — Karen's younger sister, six years old, described as being rather plain-faced, who likes making up riddles.
- Valerie "Val" Lewis — Karen's new friend. Because her parents are divorced, Karen tries to learn all she can about divorce from her.
- Mary Louise — a girlfriend of Jeff's, who is described as being kind of chubby.
- "Garfa" — Karen's grandfather, with whom she is close. His nickname comes from when Jeff was a baby and could not pronounce "Grandpa"; the garbled pronunciation stuck, and all members of the Newman family address him as such.
- Petey Mansfield — Jeff's best friend.
- Uncle Dan — Ellie's brother-in-law.
- Aunt Ruth Robinson — Ellie's sister who hates Bill.
- Mew — Karen's cat.
