= Places I Never Meant to Be =

1999 short story collection edited by Judy Blume

- Editor: Judy Blume
- Language: English
- Genre: Short story anthology
- Publisher: Simon & Schuster
- Publication date: 1999
- Publication place: United States
- Media type: Print (Hardback)
- Pages: 208 pp
- ISBN: 0-689-82034-8
- OCLC: 39625008
- LC Class: PZ5 .P6635 1999

Places I Never Meant to Be is a collection of short stories written by authors who have been censored or banned in some form in the United States, edited by Judy Blume and first published in 1999. Sales went to benefit the National Coalition Against Censorship.

== Stories ==
Stories included are:

- Norma Fox Mazer, "Meeting the Mugger"
- Julius Lester, "Spear"
- Rachel Vail, "Going Sentimental"
- Katherine Paterson, "The Red Dragonfly"
- Jacqueline Woodson, "July Saturday"
- Harry Mazer, "You Come, Too, A-Ron"
- Walter Dean Myers, "The Beast Is in the Labyrinth"
- Susan Beth Pfeffer, "Ashes"
- David Klass, "Baseball Camp"
- Paul Zindel, "Love and Centipedes"
- Chris Lynch, "Lie, No Lie"
- Norma Klein, "Something Which is Non-Existent"
