= Deenie =

Novel by Judy Blume

- First edition
- Author: Judy Blume
- Language: English
- Genre: Young adult novel
- Publisher: Bradbury Press
- Publication date: 1973
- Publication place: United States
- Media type: Print
- Pages: 160 pp
- ISBN: 0-87888-061-5
- OCLC: 800751
- LC Class: PZ7.B6265 De

Deenie is a 1973 young adult novel written by Judy Blume.

== Plot summary ==
Deenie chronicles the life of 13-year-old Wilmadeene "Deenie" Fenner, whose mother, Thelma, is determined to have her become a model. At the same time, Deenie's 16-year-old sister, Helen, who is academically proficient, is being pushed by Thelma to keep her grades up so that she can eventually become a doctor or a lawyer. One of her mother's favorite sayings is "Deenie's the beauty, Helen's the brain."

One day, Deenie is diagnosed with scoliosis, and is prescribed a body brace to wear for the next four years. At the same time, Helen has fallen in love with Joe Roscow, a charming and romantic young gentleman who works for the Fenners' family business, a gas station but wants to be a forest ranger and a poet. Thelma, upset that her plans for her daughters are coming undone, has Joe fired and exhorts Deenie to resume the pursuit of a modeling career once she stops wearing the back brace. Fearful that Helen hates her because Thelma's excuse for letting Joe go was because of the family's doctors' bills, Deenie is astonished to learn that Helen refuses to blame her for her sweetheart's departure, and the sisters close ranks.

Though initially upset at having to wear the body brace, Deenie eventually resigns herself to it. She finds herself at peace with the idea of not becoming a model, and, inspired by her experience, begins to ponder a future career as an orthopedist, concluding that she never really wanted to be a model anyway.

In the final chapter, Deenie takes off her brace and puts on an old favorite outfit in anticipation of attending a party at her friend Janet's house. She asks her father, Frank, for permission to not wear her brace to the party. Though Thelma gives her consent, Frank, who, until then, was rather mute about everything, firmly refuses, rightfully pointing out that Deenie would want to not wear the brace for every special occasion thereafter, if he gave in that night.

In defiance, Deenie brings her old outfit to Janet's house, intending to remove the brace and change clothes once there, but changes her mind; she leaves her brace on and her old clothes in Janet's room, where they stay for the duration of the party.

Other story arcs include Deenie's friendship with Barbara Curtis, a girl whose eczema alienates her from her other classmates, and Deenie's anxiety over whether her crush will still like her in spite of her back brace.

Deenie is named after the character Natalie Wood played in Splendor in the Grass. The movie itself was mentioned in description in the book, though the name of the movie was not.

== Themes ==
An important topic is that of parents exhorting their children to take up professions that the parents feel that are suited for them, whether or not the children are amenable to the idea. Thelma justifies her insistence that Deenie pursue a modeling career and that Helen become a doctor or lawyer by saying that she just "wanted better" for her children.

Ableism is briefly touched on when Deenie's guidance counselor recommends that Deenie take the "special bus" to school simply because her back brace "qualifies" her for such. Fearing that her parents would agree with the counselor and because of her own perceived stigma regarding students who ride the special bus, Deenie tears up the parental consent form that she is given to take to her parents and does not even tell them about the meeting with the guidance counselor.

== Reception ==
This book, like many others written by Blume, has been banned in schools for themes deemed inappropriate for adolescents; in this case, talk about masturbation and sexuality. Deenie is on the American Library Association list of the 100 Most Frequently Challenged Books of 1990–2000 at forty-sixth.

The passages that are most frequently cited as reasons for removing the book from libraries are: "[That week] I touched my special place practically every night. It was the only way I could fall asleep and besides, it felt good" [p. 79 in the 2005 Laurel-Leaf edition] and "Usually I take showers and get in and out as fast as possible. But the hot water [in the bathtub] was very relaxing and soon I began to enjoy it. I reached down and touched my special place with the washcloth. I rubbed and rubbed until I got that good feeling" [p. 129].

These, along with a discussion about menstruation and masturbation [p. 79-82] led by a gym teacher, are the core of the objections to the novel. The book is otherwise usually described as insightful and accurate in portraying a young girl dealing with her diagnosis of scoliosis, as well as coming of age.

== Characters ==
- Deenie Fenner — The main character. Thelma's plans for Deenie to become a model are in jeopardy when Deenie is diagnosed with scoliosis.
- Thelma Fenner — Deenie's mother. Telling just about everyone that "Deenie's the beauty, Helen's the brain," she pushes her daughters towards careers that she believes are best suited for them, whether they like it or not.
- Frank Fenner — Deenie's father. He works long hours at the family business, a gas station. Quiet for the majority of the story, he eventually takes a firm, yet fair, parental role in making sure that Deenie wears her brace as prescribed.
- "Aunt" Rae — Thelma's best friend. She follows Thelma's lead into pushing Deenie towards a modeling career.
- Janet Kayser — One of Deenie's best friends. She is selected for the cheerleading squad instead of Deenie.
- Midge Otonis — Another of Deenie's best friends. Physically larger than most of the other seventh grade students, she is self-conscious about her size and the fact that most boys ignore her because of it.
- Helen Fenner — Deenie's older sister. Thelma exhorts her to keep up her grades, to the exclusion of all non-academic pursuits, in the hopes that she will eventually become a doctor or lawyer.
- Buddy Brader — A boy that Deenie likes; the feeling is eventually revealed to be mutual.
- Steve Hildrick — A boy Janet has a crush on.
- Harvey Grabowski — A ninth-grade student, and president of the student council. Janet also has a crush on him.
- Joe Roscow — Helen's sweetheart. He works at the gas station with Frank but aspires to be a forest ranger and a poet. Thelma has him fired not long after he and Helen are caught together.
- Barbara Curtis — A new friend of Deenie's; she suffers from eczema, which causes nearly everyone else to ostracize her. Deenie herself had not wanted to associate with Barbara initially, but having to be Barbara's partner in gym class allows Deenie to get to know her better.
- Susan Minton — Deenie's classmate who idolizes her and obsessively tries to copy her style.
- Eileen Rappoport — Deenie's gym teacher. She notices something strange about Deenie's posture, and her phone call to the Fenner home regarding this leads to Deenie eventually being diagnosed with scoliosis.

== See also ==
- List of most commonly challenged books in the U.S.
