= Blubber (novel) =

1974 children's novel by Judy Blume

- First edition
- Author: Judy Blume
- Language: English
- Genre: Young adult
- Publisher: Bradbury Press
- Publication date: 1974
- Publication place: United States
- Media type: Print (paperback)
- Pages: 153 pp
- ISBN: 0-87888-072-0
- OCLC: 1131889
- LC Class: PZ7.B6265 Bl

Blubber is a children's novel by Judy Blume first published in 1974. The narrator is Jill Brenner, a Pennsylvania fifth-grader who joins her classmates in ostracizing and bullying Linda Fischer, an awkward and overweight girl. Linda gives an oral class report about whales and is hence nicknamed "Blubber" by her peers.

== Plot ==
The story takes place in Radnor, Pennsylvania, a suburb of Philadelphia.

The entire class ostracizes Linda. Although she is not the heaviest student in their class, Wendy and her best friend and sidekick Caroline are Linda's chief tormentors and bully her physically and psychologically (forcing her to say things such as "I am Blubber, the Smelly Whale of Class 206"). As a member of Wendy's clique, Jill participates in the bullying without remorse, though Wendy and Caroline are usually the instigators. Linda confronts Jill and threatens her with revenge after one incident, but Jill dismisses the threat, confident of her status and protection as one of Wendy's circle.

On Halloween, Jill and her best friend Tracy play a prank on their grouch of a neighbor, Mr. Machinist, by stuffing raw rotten eggs into his mailbox. However, they are later identified from a photo taken by Mr. Machinist and are made to rake leaves in his backyard as punishment. While raking, Jill and Tracy need to use the restroom. They urinate all over Mr. Machinist's trees.

Remembering Linda's threat, Jill suspects "Blubber" was the one who tattled on her and Tracy. Tracy, however, suspects Wendy and Caroline, which infuriates Wendy. To appease Wendy, Jill suggests that the class hold a mock trial for Linda (with Wendy, naturally, as judge, and a jury made up of several classmates). To this suggestion, Tracy remarks that she thinks Jill is scared of Wendy. Jill soon realizes Tracy is right.

The "trial" falls apart when Wendy, as judge, denies Linda her right to a "lawyer", and Jill, frustrated with herself for so readily following Wendy's lead, finally stands up to Wendy. Wendy arouses Jill's anger by using a racial slur against Tracy, who is Chinese-American. Linda, who has been locked in the classroom closet, is set free by Jill. Wendy, furious that Jill dared to question her authority, threatens to make Jill "sorry [she was] ever born".

Jill comes to school the next morning to find Wendy has made good on her threat and turned the entire class against Jill, tagging her with the nickname "B.B." (short for "Baby Brenner"). Jill's tormentors include Linda, who has joined with Wendy and is more than willing to bully one of her former harassers. Jill believes she can be stronger by playing into the jokes. However, when she tries to laugh at the taunting, the others even use that to make fun of her. Jill goes further to fight the bullying by setting Wendy, Linda, and Wendy's best friend Caroline against each other. She tells Caroline she should make her own decisions and that Linda has taken her place as Wendy's best friend (which Linda affirms). Caroline is hurt, and Wendy is furious at Linda. Jill makes friends with Rochelle, a quiet girl who has never participated in the bullying.

By the end, although the class atmosphere is tense, no one is being singled out or picked on. Jill comments on how friendships in the class have changed completely, but notes that Tracy is a friend she can always count on having.

== Reception ==
=== Awards ===
Blubber has received the following accolades:

- North Dakota Children's Choice Award (1983)
- Pacific Northwest Library Association Young Reader's Choice Award (1977)

=== Controversy ===
According to the American Library Association, Blubber, like many of Judy Blume's books, has frequently been at the center of controversy in the United States. It landed on the list of top 100 banned and challenged books between 1990 and 1999, as well as between 2000 and 2009.

== See also ==
- List of most commonly challenged books in the U.S.
