= The One in the Middle Is the Green Kangaroo =

1969 book by Judy Blume

- First edition
- Author: Judy Blume
- Illustrator: Lois Axeman; Amy Aitken; Irene Trivas; Debbie Ridpath Ohi
- Language: English
- Genre: Children's novel
- Publisher: Reilly & Lee; Bradbury; Dell; Simon & Schuster
- Publication date: 1969
- Publication place: United States

The One in the Middle Is the Green Kangaroo is a children's book published in 1969, written by Judy Blume and featuring different illustrations over multiple editions. It was Blume's first published work.

== Plot ==
The story follows second-grader Freddy Dissel (about 8 years old). He is a middle child and feels emotionally squashed between his older brother Mike and his younger sister Ellen. After failing to bond with his siblings, he loses some self-esteem. At school, he overhears an upcoming school play and, despite being underage, volunteers to perform after a discussion with the director. Freddy is given the role of the Green Kangaroo who serves as narrator. Upon returning home, Freddy shares the news of his role in the play, with mixed reactions from his siblings. On the night of the play, Freddy is ready to hop out on stage. After a moment of nervousness, Freddy is able to welcome the audience and the play commences with him joining in the other actors throughout the story. As everyone takes a bow at the end, Freddy comes forward and gives one more bow to the delight of the audience, restoring his self-esteem. Life goes on for Freddy, who is now just happy to be himself.

== Publication history ==
The book was originally published in 1969 by the Reilly & Lee imprint of the Henry Regnery Company with illustrations by Lois Axeman. It has been reissued multiple times, first in 1981 with revised text and new illustrations by Amy Aitken published by the Bradbury Press and the Yearling imprint of Dell Publishing. It was again reissued by Dell in 1991 with new illustrations by Irene Trivas, and finally in 2014 by Simon & Schuster with illustrations by Debbie Ridpath Ohi.
